= Italian electronic identity card =

National identity card of Italy

Italian electronic identity card (Carta di identità elettronica)
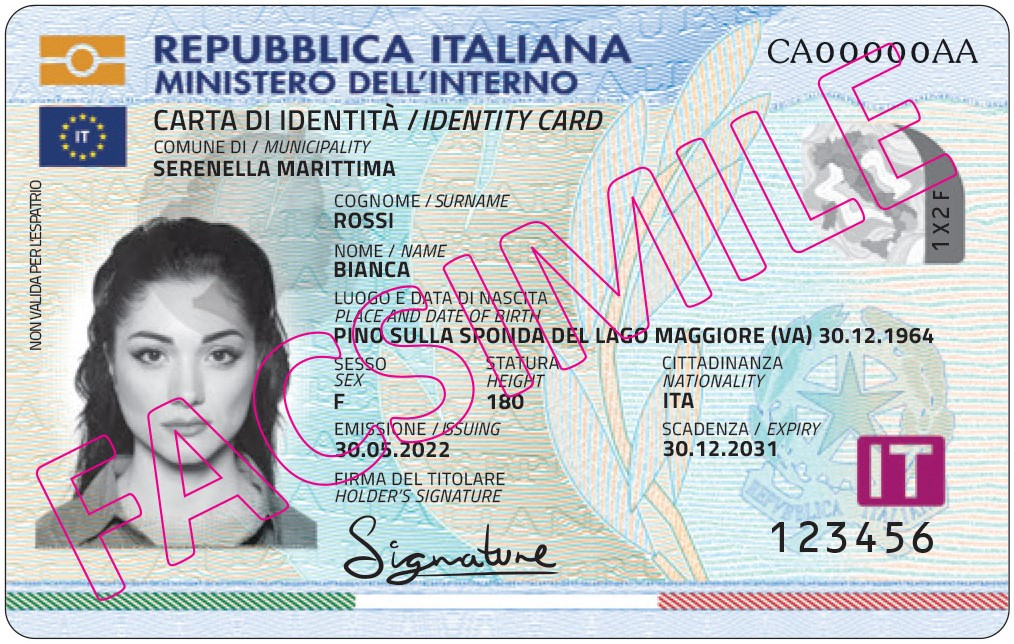

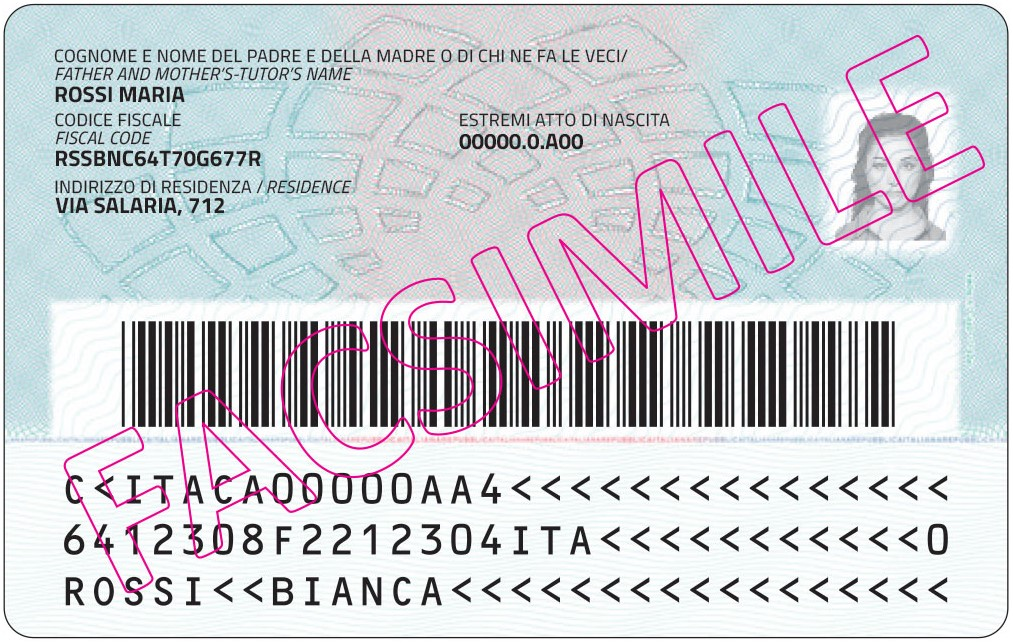
- CIE 3.0 (2022)
- Type: Optional identity document
- Issued by: Italy
- First issued: 1931 (first ID card); 2001 (first CIE); 29 September 2022 (current)
- Purpose: Identification, travel
- Valid in: EFTA; European Union; United Kingdom (EU Settlement Scheme); Rest of Europe (except Belarus, Russia, and Ukraine) Egypt; Georgia; Montserrat (max. 14 days); Overseas France; Turkey
- Eligibility: Italian citizenship, or else any citizenship if legally residing in Italy
- Expiration: On the first birthday after: 3 years (age <3); 5 years (age 3–18); 9 years (age 18–70) Unlimited (age >70) Residence permit duration (for non-EEA foreigners)
- Cost: €16.79+fees; €21.95–€27.11 (abroad)

The Italian electronic identity card (Italian: carta di identità elettronica, CIE), or simply carta d'identità (lit. 'identity card'), is an identification document issued to Italian citizens and to legal aliens residing in Italy, that has been progressively replacing the paper-based identity card since version 3.0 was first released on 4 July 2016. The CIE is intended for both digital and physical identification. The biometric information is printed on an ID-1 card and stored in a contactless chip.

== Overview ==
The Italian identity card is an optional identity document that may be issued to anyone who is resident in Italy and only to Italian citizens living abroad. A card issued to an Italian citizen is accepted in lieu of a passport to exercise the right of free movement in the European Economic Area and Switzerland or to travel to those countries with which Italy has signed specific agreements.

Although any government-issued document (such as a passport or driving licence) can be shown for identification, identity cards are very widespread in Italy; so much so that it is the first document asked and the most widely accepted in both the public and private sectors.

Italian citizens are not legally required to carry an identification document, as they have the right to identify themselves verbally. However, if they are asked to present it by law enforcement and have it with them at that moment, they must show it to avoid committing an offense. If public-security officers are not convinced of the claimed identity, such as may be the case for a verbally provided identity claim, they may keep the claimant in custody until his/her identity is ascertained.

All foreigners in Italy are required by law to have identification with them at all times. Citizens of the European Economic Area (EEA) and Switzerland must be ready to display a national identity card or a passport. Non-EEA citizens must have their passport with the proper entry stamp. Permanent resident foreigners with a valid permesso di soggiorno (residence permit) may request an Italian identity card, but in this case the document is valid only in Italy for identification purposes.

== History ==
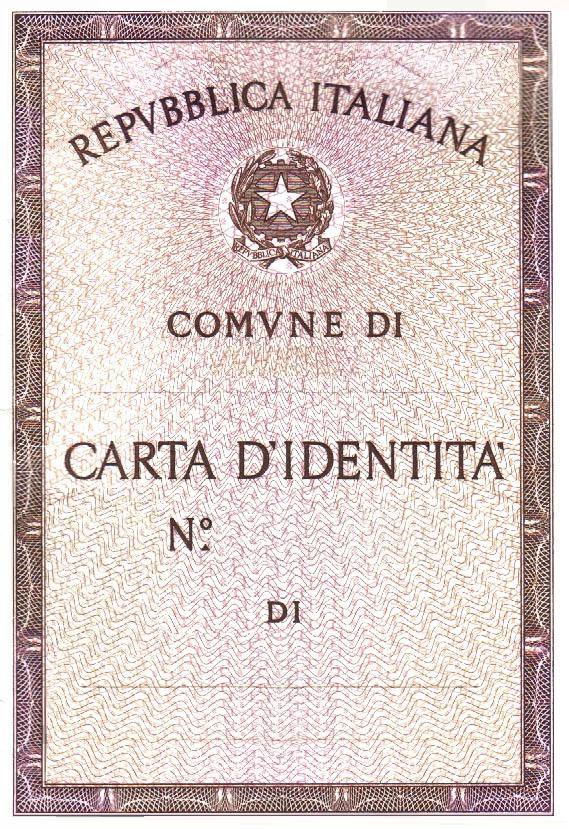
Last classic ID card (1994)

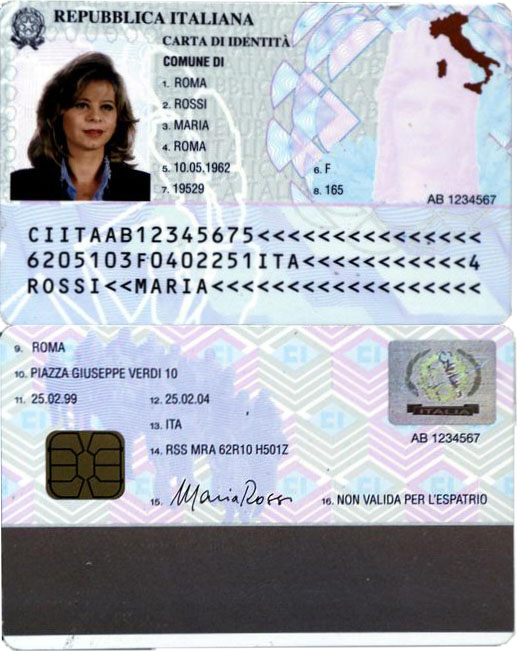
CIE (2001)

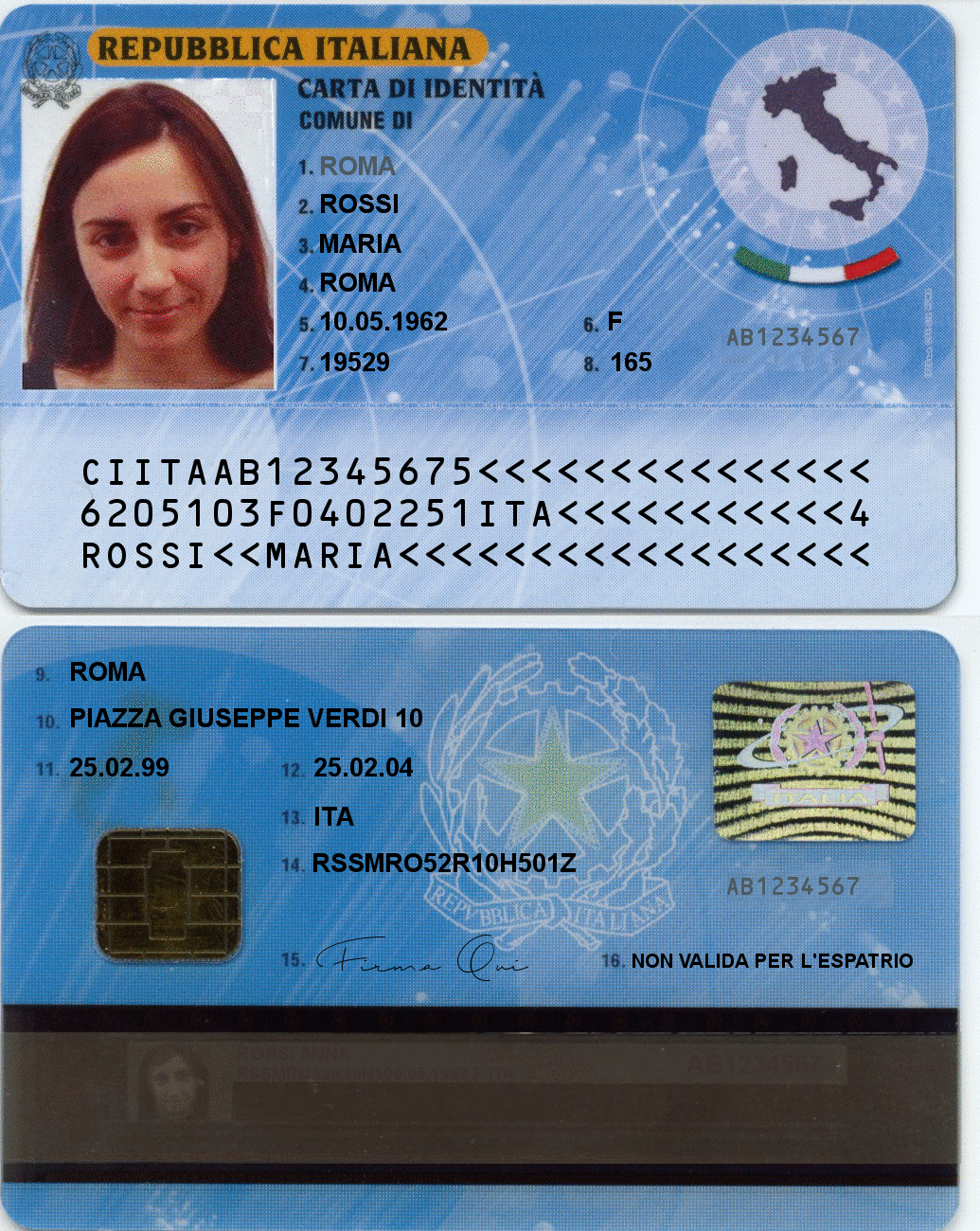
CIE 2.0 (2004)

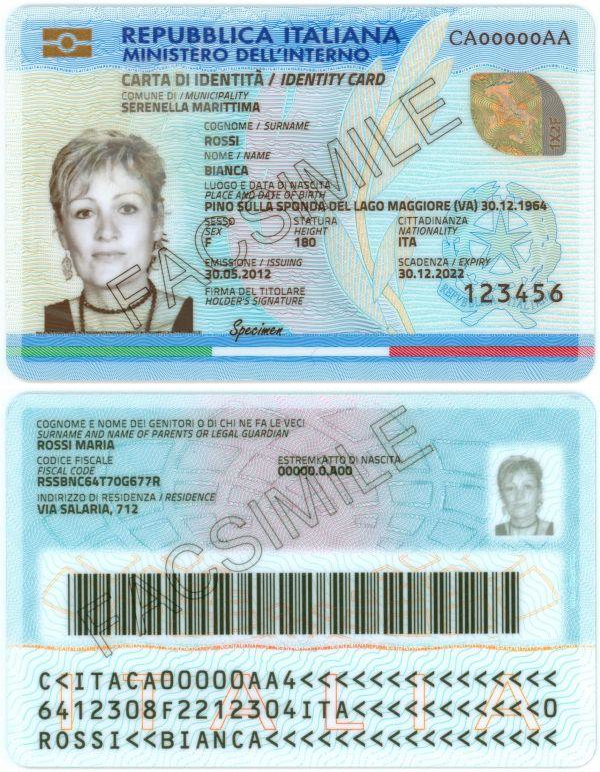
CIE 3.0 (2016)

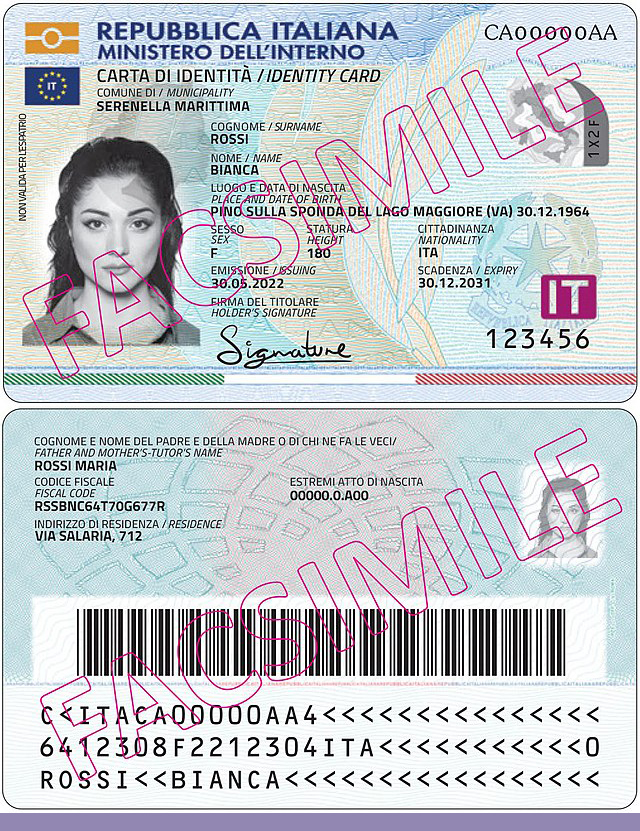
CIE 3.0 (2022)

In 1931, during the Fascist regime, the Kingdom of Italy adopted the identity card for reasons of public security, based on the article 3 of the Law 773/1931. From then on, the identity card has been in service without interruption according to this old law, to which many other laws have been added over time.

The classic paper-based identity card was issued until 2018 in Italy and until 2026 abroad or in case of emergency. On 3 August 2026, after nearly 95 years, the issuance of paper identity cards has been discontinued.

The project of an electronic identity card began in 1997, but the first phase started only in 2001 with a very first experimental model in 83 municipalities in order to identify any technical problem related to software, hardware, manufacture and use of the card. In 2004 a second experimental model was introduced, that was the CIE 2.0, working as a pilot version for future use on a national scale. In 2006 the service was extended to 153 municipalities, but at the end of 2009 just a total of 1.8 million cards was issued. The production turned out to be complex and inefficient due to the materials and mainly to the transfer printing machines which any municipality had to install to make the card. Therefore, on 23 December 2015 the government decided to use a single centralized manufacturing site, which is the IPZS in Rome (where Italian passports are made), and set the specifications of the next model.

Finally, after about 15 years of trials, as per decree of 25 May 2016 every classic identity card with expired validity has to be replaced by the electronic version. The issue of the CIE 3.0 began on 4 July 2016, initially in 199 municipalities and was extended to the whole country until 2018, as the issue of the classic identity card was definitively being suppressed inside the national territory.

According to the Regulation (EU) 2019/1157 of 20 June 2019, the phasing-out of every classic identity card shall be completed by 3 August 2026, because it does not meet the minimum security standards and does not include a functional MRZ.

On 18 July 2019, the Minister of Foreign Affairs signed a decree allowing Italians who reside abroad to request an electronic identity card. The service was tested at the consular offices in Vienna, Athens and Nice, before being extended throughout the European Union, to some countries where Italians have the right of free movement (Norway, Monaco, San Marino, Switzerland, Vatican City), to the United Kingdom and the United States.

As per decree of 21 July 2022 which complies with the requirements of Regulation (EU) 2019/1157, on 29 September 2022 the design was slightly changed, with the addition of the two-letter country code "IT" inside an EU flag (in the top left corner) as well as inside a square with optically variable ink (in the bottom right corner) and with a different position of the warning if it is not valid abroad.

Starting august 3, 2026 paper cards are not valid anymore or ceased validity, due to the new EU regulations. This didn't affected the obbligation of identification of idenitifaction of the other documents.

A camapaign video has been launched "Se non è elettronica, non vale" (If not ellectronic, no value). However, nothing has changed.

== Contactless chip ==
Like European biometric passports, the CIE has an embedded electronic microprocessor chip which complies with the international ICAO 9303 recommendations governing the characteristics of electronic travel documents and stores the following items:

- Name
- Surname
- Place and date of birth
- Residency
- Holder's picture
- Two fingerprints (one of each hand), only if the applicant is aged 12 or over

The information can be read by means of NFC tools; however, fingerprints are accessible only by police forces.

== Physical appearance ==
The card has an ID-1 standard size and it is made of polycarbonate with many security features (such as holograms, security backgrounds, micro-texts, guilloches, optically variable ink), over which the information is printed by using laser engraving technology.

The front side bears the emblem of the Italian Republic and the background of the reverse side is derived from the geometric design of the Piazza del Campidoglio in Rome created by Renaissance artist and architect Michelangelo Buonarroti.

The descriptions of the fields are printed in Italian and English.

=== Front ===
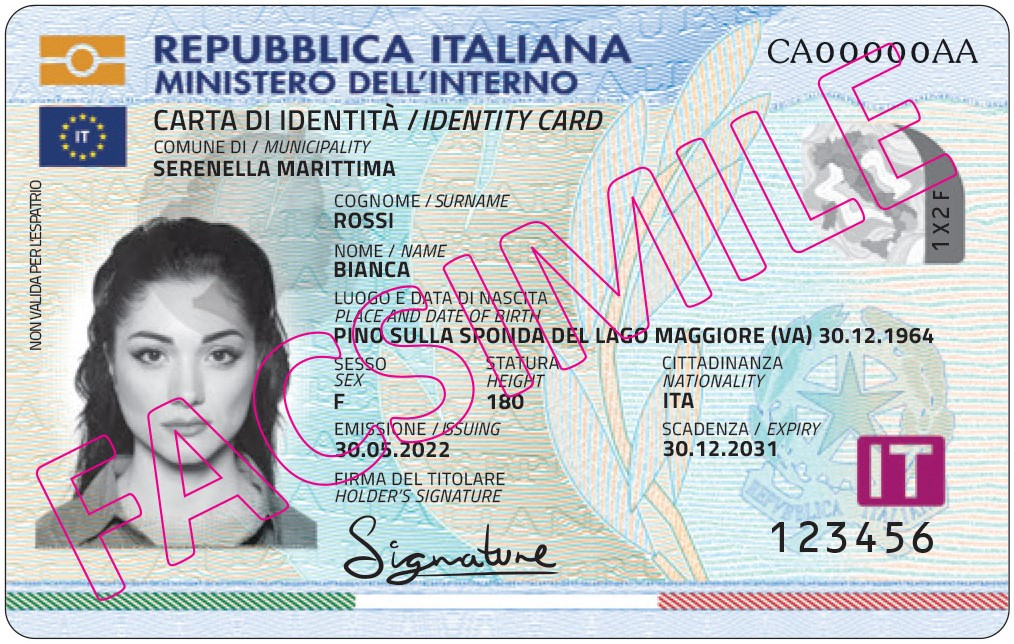
Front

1. ICAO symbol for contactless chip
2. European flag with "IT" country code
3. Card number (for example CA00000AA)
4. Issuing municipality (or, if living abroad, issuing embassy/consulate)
5. Surname
6. Name
7. Place and date of birth
8. Sex
9. Height
10. Nationality
11. Date of issue
12. Date of expiry
13. Holder's signature
14. "IT" country code with optically variable ink
15. Card Access Number – CAN
16. (Optional) The sentence "NON VALIDA PER L'ESPATRIO" is printed only if the card is not valid for travel abroad

=== Reverse ===
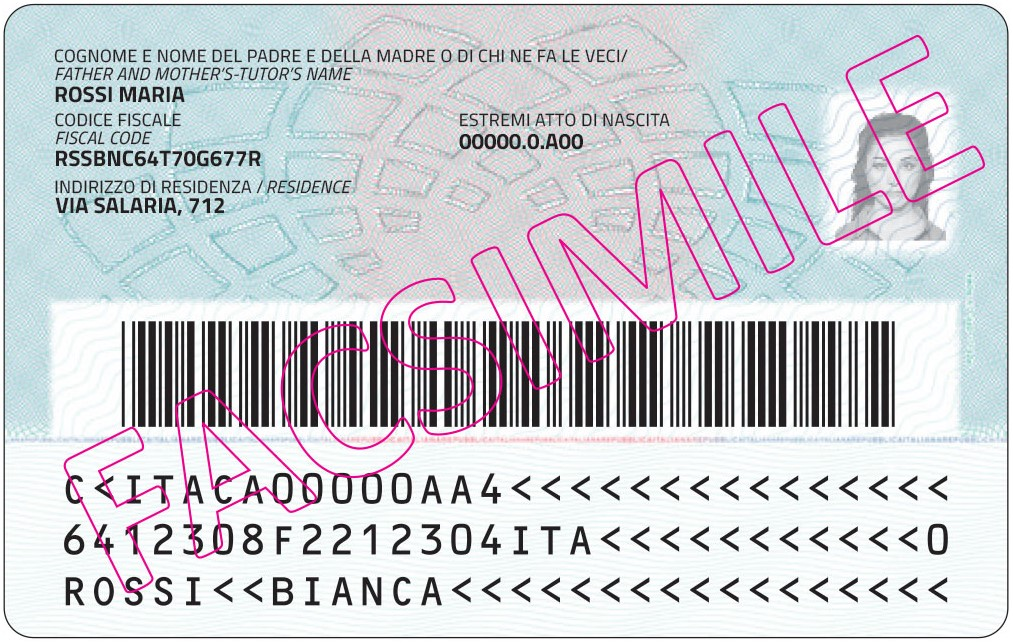
Reverse

1. Surname and name of parents or legal guardian (for applicants aged 0–14, only if the card is valid abroad)
2. Italian tax code
3. Italian birth code
4. Residence address
5. (Optional) The field "COMUNE DI ISCRIZIONE AIRE" is added in case of an Italian applicant residing abroad
6. Secondary (ghost) facial image
7. Italian tax code in the form of barcode
8. Machine Readable Zone – MRZ

=== Trilingual versions ===
In some parts of Italy where a minority language is recognized as official, the identity card could be issued with a third additional language:

- in South Tyrol with German
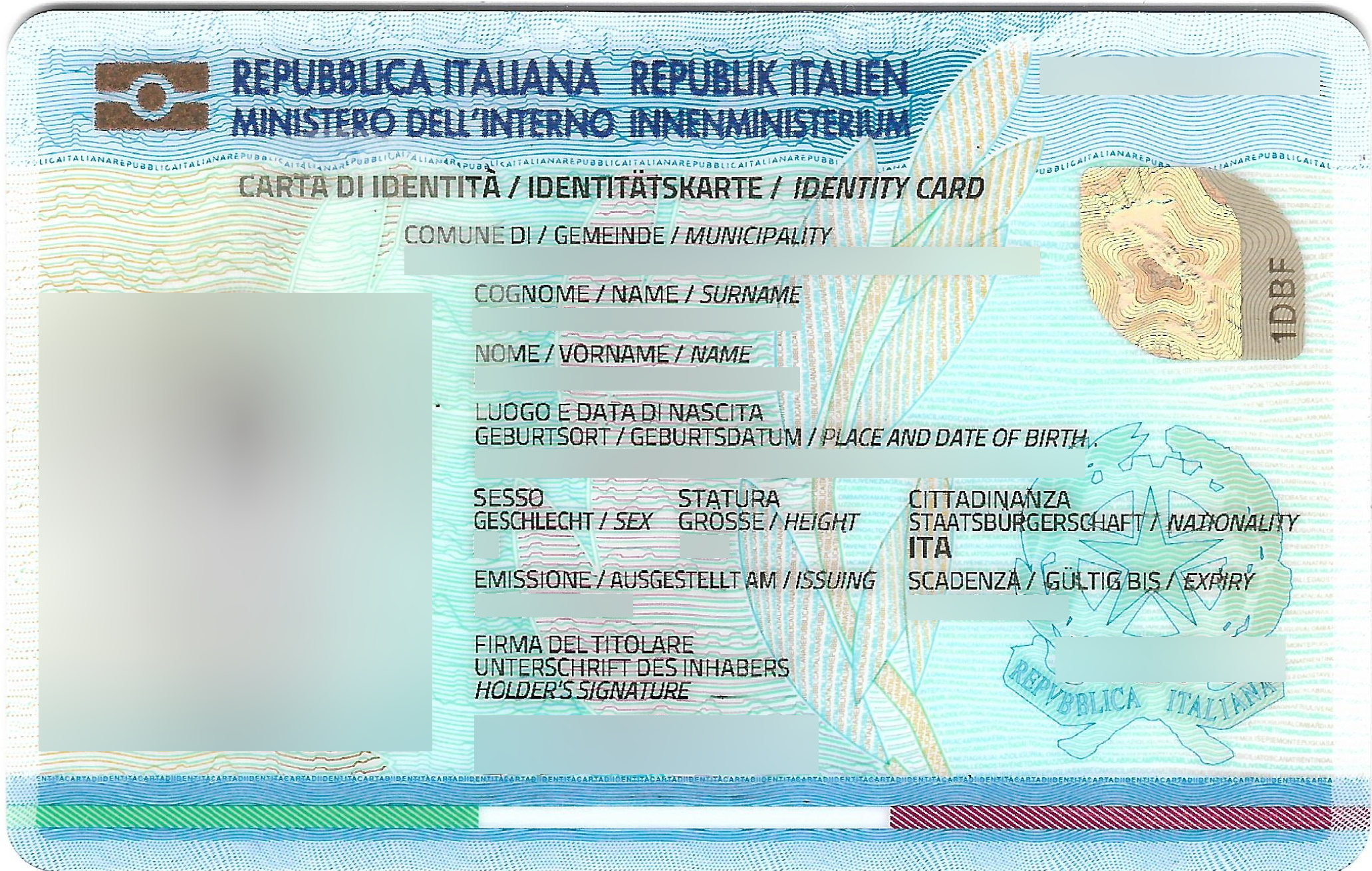
- in the Aosta Valley with French
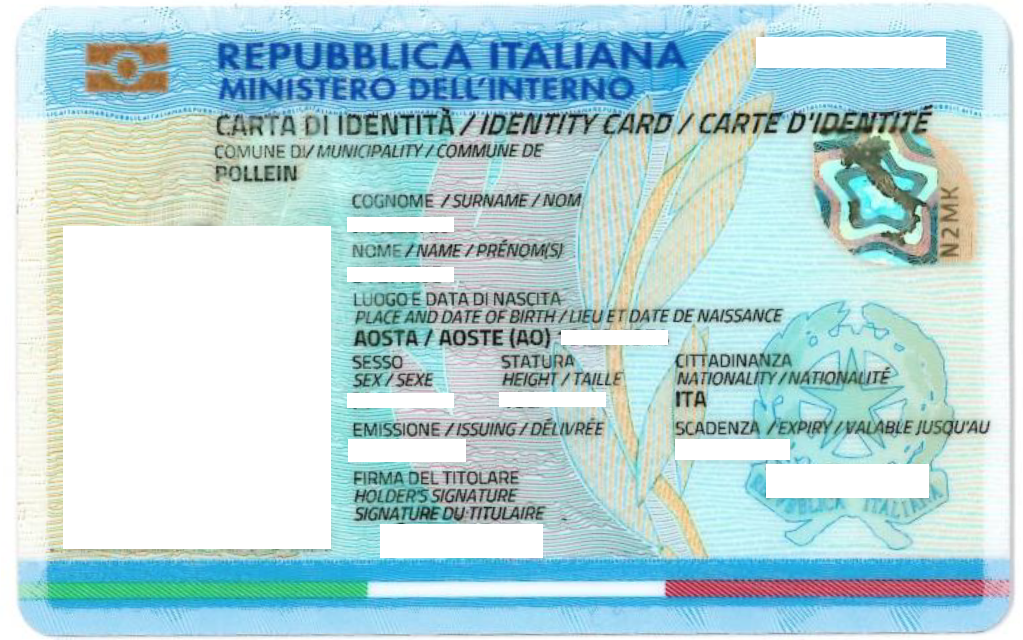

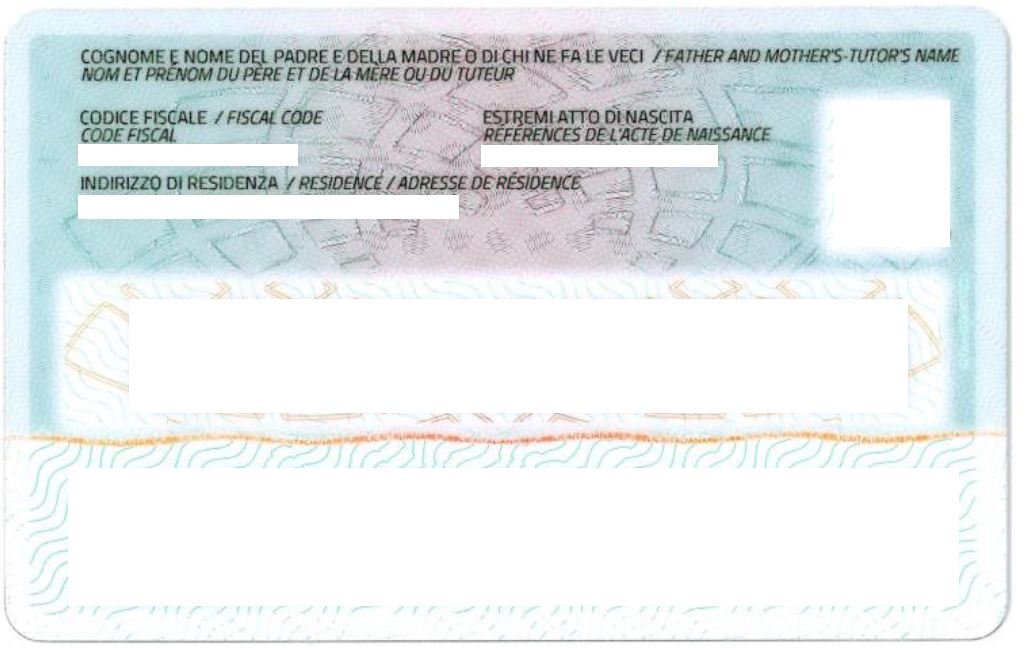
- in Friuli-Venezia Giulia with Slovene
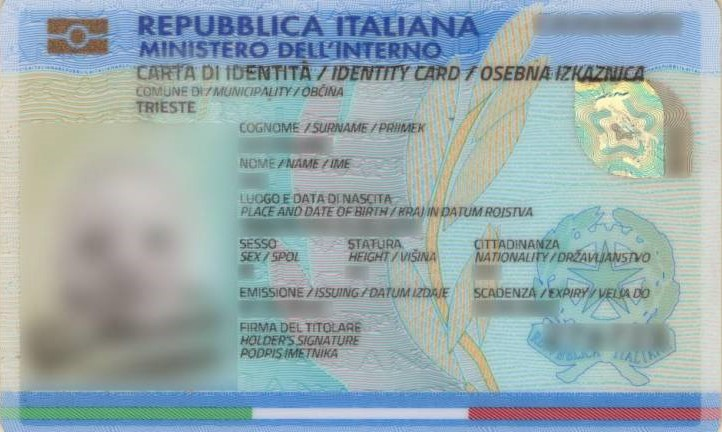

== Issue, price and validity ==
The CIE may be requested at the Italian municipality of residence by Italian citizens and resident aliens. The request is digitally processed and transmitted to the Ministry of Internal Affairs which issues the card in collaboration with the IPZS in Rome. The card is sent to the address specified by the applicant (or else to the municipality) and it should arrive within 6 working days. The costs are: €16.79 for the card issuing and €5.42 for fees charged by the municipality, which may vary (usually doubled) if the previous card was lost, stolen or deteriorated.

Italian citizens residing outside Italy may submit an application for the electronic identity card at an Italian embassy or consulate in all European Union countries and in 115 offices in non-EU countries including Albania, Argentina, Australia, Brazil, Canada, Côte d'Ivoire, Japan, India, Norway, Monaco, San Marino, Switzerland, Vatican City, United Kingdom, and United States. The issuing process is the same as in Italy and the card should arrive within 15 to 25 days. The costs are: €21.95 in case of renewal or first issue or €27.11 if the previous card was lost or stolen.

Foreign citizens who have a residence permit (permesso di soggiorno) can also request the Italian CIE, but this will be valid only in Italy.

=== Validity ===
The CIE expires on the applicant's birthday after:

- 3 years for minors aged up to 3
- 5 years for minors aged 3–18
- 9 years for adults aged 18–70

As of 30 July 2026, the card is issued without expiry for adults aged 70 and over.

== See also ==
- National identity cards in the European Economic Area
- Identity document
- List of national identity card policies by country
- Italian passport
- Visa requirements for Italian citizens
