= Visa requirements for Italian citizens =

Administrative entry restrictions

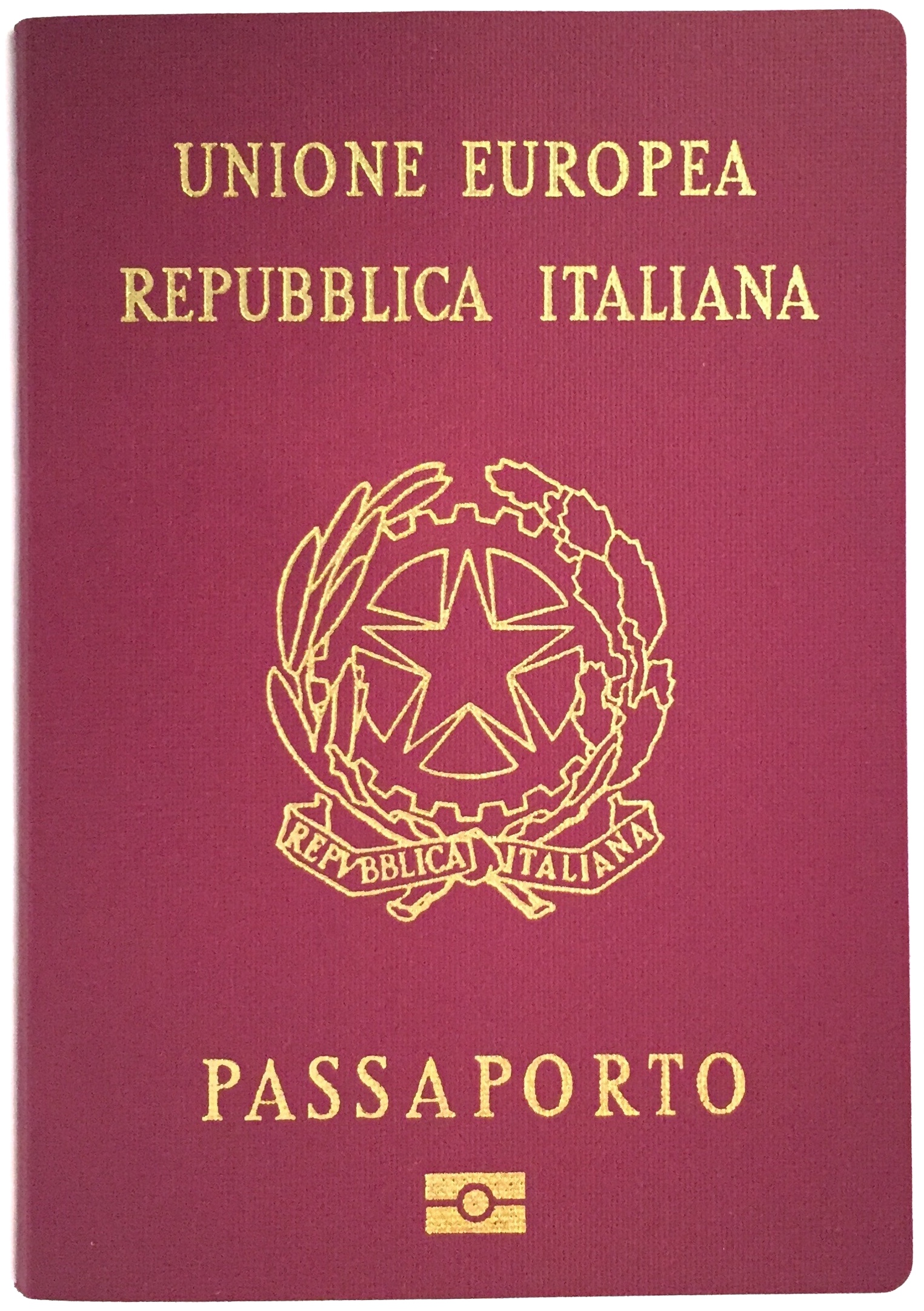
An Italian passport

Visa requirements for Italian citizens are administrative entry restrictions by the authorities of other states placed on citizens of Italy.

As of 2026, Italian citizens had visa-free access to 185 countries and territories, ranking the Italian passport fourth in the world according to the Henley Passport Index.

== Visa requirements map ==
Visa requirements for Italian citizens holding ordinary passports Italy Freedom of movement Visa not required / ESTA / eTA / eVisitor Visa available both on arrival or online Visa on arrival eVisa Visa required

== Visa requirements ==
Country / Region	Visa requirement	Allowed stay	Notes (excluding departure fees)
Afghanistan	eVisa	30 days	Visa is not required in case born in Afghanistan or can proof that one of their parents is a national of Afghanistan or born in Afghanistan.; e-Visa : Visitors must arrive at Kabul International (KBL).
Albania	Visa not required	90 days	ID card valid.
Algeria	Visa required / Visa on arrival		Since 2023, Algerian authorities have set up a system for obtaining "Visa on Arrival" for tourists participating in a trip authorized and organized by an Algerian Travel Agency, and recognized by the Algerian Ministry of Tourism, that includes at least one stop at one of the tourist sites in the Sahara. The visa is issued upon arrival only at Algiers International Airport or at Djanet Airport.
Andorra	Visa not required	90 days	ID card valid.
Angola	Visa not required	30 days	30 days per trip, but no more than 90 days within any 1 calendar year for tourism purposes only.; Visitors must have a return/onward ticket and a hotel reservation confirmation.; An International Certificate of Vaccination is required.
Antigua and Barbuda	Visa not required	90 days	
Argentina	Visa not required	90 days	
Armenia	Visa not required	180 days	No more than 180 days in any 12-month period
Australia	eVisitor	90 days	90 days on each visit in 12-month period if granted.; May enter using SmartGate.
Austria	Freedom of movement	Freedom of movement; ID card valid.	
Azerbaijan	eVisa	30 days	
Bahamas	Visa not required	90 days	
Bahrain	eVisa / Visa on arrival	14 days	
Bangladesh	Visa on arrival	30 days	
Barbados	Visa not required	90 days	
Belarus	Visa not required	30 days	Visa-free until 31 December 2026, valid at all border checkpoints.
Belgium	Freedom of movement	Freedom of movement.; ID card valid.	
Belize	Visa not required	90 days	
Benin	eVisa	30 days	Must have an international vaccination certificate.; Three types of electronic visa are offered: the e-Visa valid for 30 days for a single entry (50€), the e-Visa valid for 30 days for several (multiple) entries (75€), and the e-Visa valid for 90 days to make several (multiple) entries (100€)
Bhutan	eVisa		
Bolivia	Visa not required	90 days	
Bosnia and Herzegovina	Visa not required	90 days	90 days within any 6-month period.; ID card valid.
Botswana	Visa not required	90 days	90 days within any 12 month period.
Brazil	Visa not required	90 days	90 days within any 180 day period.
Brunei	Visa not required	90 days	
Bulgaria	Freedom of movement	Freedom of movement.; ID card valid.	
Burkina Faso	eVisa	30 days	
Burundi	eVisa / Visa on arrival	30 days	
Cambodia	eVisa / Visa on arrival	30 days	You have to pay 30 USD for a Single entry Visa on the arrival. No photos needed.; One day visit is not permitted if you land to the Siem Reap Airport. No restrictions if you arrive in other borders.
Cameroon	eVisa		
Canada	eTA / Visa not required	180 days	eTA required if arriving by air.
Cape Verde	Visa not required	30 days	Must register online at least five days prior to arrival.
Central African Republic	Visa required		
Chad	eVisa	90 days	Must apply at least 7 days before arrival but maximum 90 days before arrival.
Chile	Visa not required	90 days	
China	Visa not required	30 days	Visa-free from December 1, 2023 to December 31, 2026.; Visa not required to Hainan for 15 days.; 240-hour (10-day) visa-free transit to a third country or region (including Hong Kong, Macau or Taiwan) using any mode of transport. Must have a confirmed onward ticket/itinerary, and enter through 1 of 64 approved ports.; During which, may freely travel within the 24 provinces permitted for visa-free transit and engage in tourism, business, and visits.; 24-hour visa-free transit to a third country or region (including Hong Kong, Macau, and Taiwan), is available at most international airports, without leaving the airport.; Travellers who need to leave the airport may obtain a temporary entry permit from immigration.; 5-day port visa (Visa on Arrival) for Shenzhen if arriving at designated ports of entry from Hong Kong by land or sea, for stays within Shenzhen.; 3-day port visa (Visa on Arrival) if arriving in Zhuhai or Xiamen at designated ports of entry, for stays within the respective city.; 15-day visa-free entry for cruise ship passengers in tour groups, if arriving at any cruise port along China's coastline, including but not limited to Tianjin; Dalian; Shanghai; Lianyungang; Wenzhou; Zhoushan; Xiamen; Qingdao; Guangzhou; Shenzhen; Beihai; Haikou; Sanya. May further travel inland to all regions of coastal provinces (and equivalents) and Beijing.; May apply for a port visa (Visa on Arrival) if travelling for an urgent, qualified reason. Prior clearance for port visa is highly recommended or may be denied boarding by airlines.
Colombia	Visa not required	90 days	90 days - extendable up to 180-days stay within a 1-year period.
Comoros	Visa on arrival	30 days	
Republic of the Congo	Visa required		
Democratic Republic of the Congo	eVisa	7 days	7 days eVisa as "Airport Visa"
Costa Rica	Visa not required	180 days	
Côte d'Ivoire	eVisa	90 days	e-Visa holders must arrive via Port Bouet Airport.
Croatia	Freedom of movement	Freedom of movement.; ID card valid.	
Cuba	eVisa	90 days	Can be extended up to 90 days with a fee.
Cyprus	Freedom of movement	Freedom of movement.; ID card valid.	
Czech Republic	Freedom of movement	Freedom of movement.; ID card valid.	
Denmark	Freedom of movement	Freedom of movement (DK).; ID card valid.	
Djibouti	eVisa	90 days	
Dominica	Visa not required	90 days	90 days within any 180 day period.
Dominican Republic	Visa not required	30 days	
Ecuador	Visa not required	90 days	90 days within any 12 months period
Egypt	eVisa / Visa on arrival	30 days	ID card valid
El Salvador	Visa not required	180 days	
Equatorial Guinea	eVisa		
Eritrea	Visa required		
Estonia	Freedom of movement	Freedom of movement.; ID card valid.	
Eswatini	Visa not required	30 days	
Ethiopia	eVisa / Visa on arrival	90 days	Visa on arrival is obtainable only at Addis Ababa Bole International Airport.; e-Visa holders must arrive via Addis Ababa Bole International Airport.; e-Visa is available for 30 or 90 days.
Fiji	Visa not required	120 days	
Finland	Freedom of movement	Freedom of movement.; ID card valid.	
France	Freedom of movement	Freedom of movement (in Regions of France).; ID card valid.	
Gabon	eVisa	90 days	e-Visa holders must arrive via Libreville International Airport.
Gambia	Visa not required	90 days	
Georgia	Visa not required	365 days	ID card valid.
Germany	Freedom of movement	Freedom of movement.; ID card valid.	
Ghana	Visa required		
Greece	Freedom of movement	Freedom of movement.; ID card valid.	
Grenada	Visa not required	90 days	
Guatemala	Visa not required	90 days	
Guinea	eVisa	90 days	International Certificate of Vaccination required.
Guinea-Bissau	Visa on arrival	90 days	Visitors must apply for a visa on arrival in advance.
Guyana	Visa not required	90 days	
Haiti	Visa not required	90 days	
Honduras	Visa not required	90 days	
Hungary	Freedom of movement	Freedom of movement.; ID card valid.	
Iceland	Freedom of movement	Freedom of movement.; ID card valid.	
India	eVisa	30 days	Visa required for land borders.; e-Visa holders must arrive via 32 designated airports (Note: Ahmedabad; Amritsar; Bagdogra; Bengaluru; Bhubaneswar; Chandigarh; Chennai; Coimbatore; Delhi; Gaya; Goa-Dabolim; Goa-Manohar; Guwahati; Hyderabad; Indore; Jaipur; Kannur; Kochi; Kolkata; Kozhikode; Lucknow; Madurai; Mangaluru; Mumbai; Nagpur; Port Blair; Pune; Surat; Thiruvananthapuram; Tiruchirappalli; Varanasi; Visakhapatnam) or 5 designated seaports. (Note: Chennai; Cochin; Mormugao (Goa); Mumbai; Mangalore); An Indian e-Tourist Visa may only be obtained twice within 1 calendar year.; Foreigners of Pakistani origin or who hold a Pakistani Passport are not eligible for an e-Visa. Foreigners who are not Pakistani nationals, but whose parents or grandparents (either paternal or maternal) were born in, or were permanent residents in Pakistan, are also not eligible for an e-Visa.
Indonesia	e-VOA / Visa on arrival	30 days	
Iran	eVisa	30 days	
Iraq	eVisa	60 days	
Ireland	Freedom of movement	Freedom of movement.; ID card valid.	
Israel	ETA-IL	90 days	
Jamaica	Visa not required	90 days	
Japan	Visa not required	90 days	
Jordan	eVisa / Visa on arrival	30 days	Visa can be obtained upon arrival, it will cost a total of 40 JOD, obtainable at most international ports of entry and land border crossings (except King Hussein/Allenby Bridge)
Kazakhstan	Visa not required	30 days	
Kenya	Electronic Travel Authorization	90 days	Applications can be submitted up to 90 days prior to travel and must be submitted at least 3 days in advance.; eTA fee is 32.50 USD.; Proof of reservation at the hotel where visitors plan to stay is required (if staying with friends, an invitation letter is also acceptable).; Yellow fever vaccination certificate is required if coming from endemic countries.
Kiribati	Visa not required	90 days	90 days within any 12 months period.
North Korea	Visa required		Tourist visa approved via tour agencies.
South Korea	Visa not required	90 days	Italian citizens are exempt from K-ETA until 31 December 2026.; The validity period of a K-ETA is 3 years from the date of approval.
Kuwait	eVisa / Visa on arrival	90 days	
Kyrgyzstan	Visa not required	60 days	
Laos	eVisa / Visa on arrival	30 days	18 (Note: Savannakhet Airport; Lanetoui - Mengkang (China); Meuangmom - Wan Pong (Myanmar); Banvang - Ban Khok Phai (Thailand); Namngeun - Huay Kon (Thailand); Paksan - Bueng Kan (Thailand); Paktaphan - Pak Saeng (Thailand); Pangmon - Ban Huak (Thailand); Phoudou (Thailand); Dak ta ock - Nam Giang (Vietnam); La Lai (Vietnam); Namkan (Vietnam); Namphao - Cau Treo (Vietnam); Namsoy - Na Meo (Vietnam); Naphao - Cha Lo (Vietnam); Pahang - Long Sap (Vietnam); Panghok - Tây Trang (Vietnam); Phoukeua - Bo Y (Vietnam)) of the 33 border crossings are only open to regular visa holders.; e-Visa may be used to enter Laos through the Luang Prabang, Pakse and Vientiane international airports, 3 Thai-Lao Friendship Bridges (Note: Vientiane (Friendship Bridge 1); Savannakhet (Friendship Bridge 2); Bokeo (Friendship Bridge 4)), in Boten (road and railroad), and in Vientiane (at Khamsavath railway station).; Visa on arrival is available at the Luang Prabang, Pakse and Vientiane international airports, 4 Thai-Lao Friendship Bridges (Note: Vientiane (Friendship Bridge 1); Savannakhet (Friendship Bridge 2); Khammouane (Friendship Bridge 3); Bokeo (Friendship Bridge 4)) and 7 border crossings. (Note: Nongnokkheane - Trapeang Kriel (Cambodia); Boten - Bo han (China); Golden Triangle/Samliemkham (Thailand); Khamsavath railway station (Thailand); Namheuang - Ban Na Kraseng (Thailand); Vang tao - Chongmek (Thailand); Dansavan - Lao Bảo (Vietnam))
Latvia	Freedom of movement	Freedom of movement.; ID card valid.	
Lebanon	Visa on arrival	30 days	Extendable for 2 additional months.; Granted free of charge at Beirut International Airport or any other port of entry if there is no Israeli visa or seal, holding a telephone number, an address in Lebanon, and a non refundable return or circle trip ticket.
Lesotho	Visa not required	90 days	
Liberia	Visa required		
Libya	eVisa		
Liechtenstein	Freedom of movement	Freedom of movement.; ID card valid.	
Lithuania	Freedom of movement	Freedom of movement.; ID card valid.	
Luxembourg	Freedom of movement	Freedom of movement.; ID card valid.	
Madagascar	eVisa / Visa on arrival	60 days	
Malawi	eVisa / Visa on arrival	30 days	
Malaysia	Visa not required	90 days	
Maldives	Visa on arrival	30 days	
Mali	Visa required		
Malta	Freedom of movement	Freedom of movement.; ID card valid.	
Marshall Islands	Visa not required	90 days	90 days within any 180 day period.; Visitors wishing to travel to Kwajalein are required to hold an Entry Authorization issued by the United States Military.
Mauritania	eVisa	720 days	
Mauritius	Visa not required	90 days	
Mexico	Visa not required	180 days	
Micronesia	Visa not required	30 days	
Moldova	Visa not required	90 days	90 days within any 180 day period.; ID card valid.
Monaco	Visa not required		ID card valid.
Mongolia	Visa not required	30 days	Visa-free until January 1, 2027.
Montenegro	Visa not required	90 days	ID card valid for 30 days.
Morocco	Visa not required	90 days	
Mozambique	Visa not required	30 days	Travelers must register on the e-Visa platform at least 48 hours prior to travel and pay a processing fee of 650 MT.
Myanmar	eVisa	28 days	e-Visa holders must arrive via Yangon, Nay Pyi Taw or Mandalay airports or via land border crossings with Thailand — Tachileik, Myawaddy and Kawthaung or India — Rih Khaw Dar and Tamu.; e-Visa available for both tourism (allowed stay is 28 days) or business (allowed stay is 70 days) purposes.
Namibia	eVisa / Visa on arrival	90 days	90 days within a calendar year.
Nauru	Visa required		
Nepal	Online Visa / Visa on arrival	90 days	
Netherlands	Freedom of movement	Freedom of movement (European Netherlands).; ID card valid.	
New Zealand	Electronic Travel Authority	90 days	International Visitor Conservation and Tourism Levy must be paid upon requesting an Electronic Travel Authority.; Holders of an Australian Permanent Resident Visa or Resident Return Visa may be granted a New Zealand Resident Visa on arrival permitting indefinite stay (pursuant to the Trans-Tasman Travel Arrangement), subject to meeting character requirements and obtaining an Electronic Travel Authority prior to departure. Such travellers are not required to pay the International Visitor Conservation and Tourism Levy.
Nicaragua	Visa not required	90 days	
Niger	Visa required		
Nigeria	eVisa	90 days	
North Macedonia	Visa not required	90 days	ID card valid.
Norway	Freedom of movement	Freedom of movement.; ID card valid.	
Oman	Visa not required / eVisa	14 days / 30 days	Italian citizens are also eligible for e-Visas valid for 30 days.; Visitors must have a confirmed hotel reservation, health insurance and a return ticket; Holders of a visa or entrance stamp of the Emirate of Dubai that is valid for at least 21 days are visa exempt.; Holders of a visa for Qatar that is valid for travel to Oman and valid for at least one month are visa exempt when arriving directly from Qatar.; Iris scan is taken on arrival.
Pakistan	eVisa	90 days	
Palau	Visa not required	30 days	
Panama	Visa not required	90 days	
Papua New Guinea	eVisa	60 days	Free visa valid for 60 days (extension is possible for a fee) on arrival at Port Moresby or Tokua (Rabaul).; Available at Gurney Airport (Alotau), Mount Hagen Airport, Port Moresby Airport and Tokua Airport (Rabaul).
Paraguay	Visa not required	90 days	
Peru	Visa not required	183 days	
Philippines	Visa not required	30 days	
Poland	Freedom of movement	Freedom of movement.; ID card valid.	
Portugal	Freedom of movement	Freedom of movement.; ID card valid.	
Qatar	Visa on arrival	30 days	
Romania	Freedom of movement	Freedom of movement.; ID card valid.	
Russia	eVisa	30 days	72-hours visa free visit when entering by regular ferry via port of St. Petersburg, provided that a passenger spends the night on-board or in accommodation specifically approved by the travel agency.
Rwanda	eVisa / Visa on arrival	30 days	
Saint Kitts and Nevis	Electronic Travel Authorisation	180 days	
Saint Lucia	Visa not required	90 days	90 days within any 180 day period.
Saint Vincent and the Grenadines	Visa not required	90 days	90 days within any 180 day period.
Samoa	Visa not required	60 days	
San Marino	Visa not required	Under bilateral agreement, there is a simplified procedure in place for obtaining residence and work permits.; ID card valid.	
São Tomé and Príncipe	Visa not required	15 days	
Saudi Arabia	eVisa / Visa on arrival	90 days	
Senegal	Visa not required	90 days	
Serbia	Visa not required	90 days	90 days within any 6-month period.; ID card valid.
Seychelles	eTA	30 days	
Sierra Leone	eVisa / Visa on arrival	30 days	It is valid for only for one month but can be extended at the immigration department once in-country.
Singapore	Visa not required	90 days	
Slovakia	Freedom of movement	Freedom of movement.; ID card valid.	
Slovenia	Freedom of movement	Freedom of movement.; ID card valid.	
Solomon Islands	Visa not required	45 days	45 days within any 12 months period.
Somalia	eVisa	30 days	All visitors must have an approved Electronic Visa (eTAS) before the start of their journey
South Africa	Visa not required	90 days	
South Sudan	eVisa		Obtainable online.; Printed visa authorization must be presented at the time of travel.
Spain	Freedom of movement	Freedom of movement.; ID card valid.	
Sri Lanka	ETA / Visa on arrival	60 days / 30 days	Sri Lanka introduced an ETA valid for 30 days.
Sudan	Visa required		
Suriname	Visa not required	90 days	An entrance fee of USD 50 or EUR 50 must be paid online prior to arrival.; Multiple entry e-Visa is also available.
Sweden	Freedom of movement	Freedom of movement.; ID card valid.	
Switzerland	Freedom of movement	Freedom of movement.; ID card valid.	
Syria	eVisa		
Taiwan	Visa not required	90 days	
Tajikistan	Visa not required	30 days	Visa also available online.; e-Visa holders can enter through all border points.
Tanzania	eVisa / Visa on arrival	90 days	
Thailand	Visa not required	60 days	Maximum two visits annually if not arriving by air.
Timor-Leste	Visa not required	90 days	90 days within any 180 day period.
Togo	eVisa	15 days	
Tonga	Visa not required	30 days	
Trinidad and Tobago	Visa not required	90 days	90 days within any 180 day period.
Tunisia	Visa not required	90 days	
Turkey	Visa not required	90 days	ID card valid.
Turkmenistan	Visa required		
Tuvalu	Visa not required	90 days	
Uganda	eVisa	90 days	Determined at the port of entry.; Must apply online at least 2 business days prior to travel. As of March 2017, airlines may deny passengers permission to board flights to Uganda without proof that they had successfully applied for an e-Visa. Ugandan immigration authorities may require additional documentation, including proof of a return plane ticket and detailed tour itinerary in Uganda.; International Certificate of Vaccination required.
Ukraine	Visa not required	90 days	90 days within any 180 day period.
United Arab Emirates	Visa not required	90 days	90 days within any 180 day period.
United Kingdom	ETA	180 days	
United States	Visa Waiver Program	90 days	ESTA is valid for 2 years from the date of issuance.; ESTA is also required when entering the country by cruise ship or land.; A Form I-94 is required for entry into the United States by land. It carries a $30 fee and can be obtained either online or upon arrival.; Visa required for nationals of VWP countries who have travelled or been present in Iran, Iraq, Libya, North Korea, Somalia, Sudan, Syria or Yemen at any time on or after 1 March 2011 or Cuba at any time on or after 12 January 2021, or nationals of VWP countries who are also nationals of Iran, Iraq, North Korea, Sudan or Syria. Exceptions apply if the travel was in military or diplomatic service of the VWP country.
Uruguay	Visa not required	90 days	
Uzbekistan	Visa not required	30 days	
Vanuatu	Visa not required	90 days	90 days within any 180 day period.
Vatican City	Visa not required		ID card valid.; Residence Forbidden
Venezuela	Visa not required	90 days	
Vietnam	Visa not required	45 days	Extended visas available at the following airports: Ho Chi Minh City, Hanoi, Phu Quoc, or Danang.; A single entry eVisa valid for 90 days is also available.; 30 day visa exemption at Phu Quoc Island.
Yemen	Visa required		
Zambia	Visa not required	30 days	Also eligible for a universal visa allowing access to Zimbabwe.
Zimbabwe	eVisa / Visa on arrival	30 days	Also eligible for a universal visa allowing access to Zambia.

== Territories, disputed areas or restricted zones ==
Visa requirements for Italian citizens for visits to various territories, disputed areas, partially recognized countries and restricted zones:

Visitor to	Visa requirement	Notes (excluding departure fees)
Europe
Abkhazia	Visa required	Tourists from all countries (except Georgia) can visit Abkhazia for a period not exceeding 24 hours as part of an organized tourist group.
Kosovo	Visa not required	90 days
Greece ( Mount Athos)	Special permit required	Special permit required (4 days: 25 euro for Orthodox visitors, 35 euro for non-Orthodox visitors, 18 euro for students). There is a visitors' quota: maximum 100 Orthodox and 10 non-Orthodox per day and women are not allowed.
Belarus (Brest and Grodno)	Visa not required	Visa-free for 10 days
Northern Cyprus	Visa not required	3 months
(United Nations) UN Buffer Zone in Cyprus	Access Permit required	Access Permit is required for travelling inside the zone, except Civil Use Areas.
Denmark (Faroe Islands)	Visa not required	90 days; Needs a residence permit/visa for larger stays.
Finland (Åland)	Freedom of movement	ID card valid.
Germany ( Büsingen am Hochrhein and Heligoland)	Freedom of movement	Unlimited: Needs registration after 90 days; ID card valid.
Italy ( Livigno and Campione d'Italia)	Freedom of movement	Unlimited Stay in Italy Territory, the Italian Citizens Permanently have the right to live and work freely in Livigno and Campione d'Italia.: There might be custom controls in Livigno due to exclusion of customs union.; ID card valid.
Gibraltar	Visa not required	Up to 6 months.
Guernsey	Visa not required	90 days within a 12 month period.
Isle of Man	Visa not required	Up to 6 months.
Jersey	Visa not required	Up to 6 months.
(Norway) Jan Mayen	Special permit required	Permit required
(Norway) Svalbard	Freedom of movement	Unlimited, any nationality may freely live and work, per Svalbard Treaty.
Portugal (Azores and Madeira)	Freedom of movement	Unlimited; ID card valid.
Russia	Special authorization required	Several closed cities and regions in Russia require special authorization.
Switzerland ( Samnaun)	Freedom of movement	Registration required after 90 days.; ID card valid.
South Ossetia	Visa not required	Multiple entry visa to Russia and three-day prior notification are required to enter South Ossetia.
Transnistria	Visa not required	Registration required after 24h.
Africa
Eritrea outside Asmara	Travel permit required	To travel in the rest of the country, a Travel Permit for Foreigners is required (20 Eritrean nakfa).
Mayotte	Freedom of movement	ID card valid.
Réunion	Freedom of movement	ID card valid.
Ascension Island	eVisa	3 months within any year period.
Saint Helena	Visitor's Pass required	Visitor's Pass granted on arrival valid for 4/10/21/60/90 days for 12/14/16/20/25 pound sterling.
Tristan da Cunha	Permission required	Permission to land required for 15/30 pounds sterling (yacht/ship passenger) for Tristan da Cunha Island or 20 pounds sterling for Gough Island, Inaccessible Island or Nightingale Islands.
Spain (Canary Islands, Ceuta and Melilla)	Freedom of movement	Registration required after 90 days.; ID card valid.
Sahrawi Arab Democratic Republic	Undefined	Undefined visa regime in the Western Sahara, same entry requirements with Morocco, controlled territory.
Somaliland	Visa on arrival	30 days for 30 US dollars, payable on arrival.
Sudan outside Khartoum	Travel permit required	All foreigners traveling more than 25 kilometers outside of Khartoum must obtain a travel permit.
(Sudan) Darfur	Travel permit required	Separate travel permit is required.
Asia
British Indian Ocean Territory	Special permit required	Special permit required.
India PAP/RAP	PAP/RAP required	Protected Area Permit (PAP) required for whole states of Nagaland and Sikkim, and parts of states Manipur, Arunachal Pradesh, Uttarakhand, Jammu and Kashmir, Rajasthan, Himachal Pradesh.; Restricted Area Permit (RAP) required for all of Andaman and Nicobar Islands and parts of Sikkim. Some of these requirements are occasionally lifted for a year.
Iraqi Kurdistan	eVisa	30 days
Kazakhstan (Baikonur & Priozersk)	Special permission required	Special permission required for the town of Baikonur and surrounding areas in Kyzylorda Oblast, and the town of Gvardeyskiy near Almaty.
(Iran) Kish Island	Visa not required	Visitors to Kish Island do not require a visa.
Malaysia (Sabah and Sarawak)	Visa not required	These states have their own immigration authorities and passport is required to travel to them, however the same visa applies.
Maldives outside Malé	Permission required	Tourists are generally prohibited from visiting non-resort islands without the express permission of the Government of Maldives.
North Korea outside Pyongyang	Special permit required	People are not allowed to leave the capital city, tourists can only leave the capital with a governmental tourist guide (no independent moving)
Palestine	Visa not required	Arrival by sea to Gaza Strip not allowed.
(Tajikistan) Gorno-Badakhshan Autonomous Province	OIVR permit required	OIVR permit required (15+5 Tajikistani Somoni) and another special permit (free of charge) is required for Lake Sarez.
Hong Kong	Visa not required	3 months
Macau	Visa not required	90 days
Taiwan	Visa not required	90 days
(China) Tibet Autonomous Region	TTP required	Tibet Travel Permit required (10 US Dollars).
Turkmenistan	Special permit required	A special permit, issued prior to arrival by Ministry of Foreign Affairs, is required if visiting the following places: Atamurat, Cheleken, Dashoguz, Serakhs and Serhetabat.
(United Nations) Korean Demilitarized Zone	Restricted area	
(United Nations) UNDOF Zone and Ghajar	Restricted area	
Yemen outside Sanaa or Aden	Special permission required	Special permission needed for travel outside Sanaa or Aden.
Americas
Anguilla	Visa not required	3 months
Bermuda	Visa not required	Up to 6 months; Decided on arrival.
British Virgin Islands	Visa not required	30 days; Extensions possible.
Cayman Islands	Visa not required	6 months
Montserrat	Visa not required	6 months
Turks and Caicos Islands	Visa not required	90 days
Netherlands (Aruba, Curaçao and Sint Maarten)	Visa not required	3 months
Netherlands (Bonaire, Sint Eustatius and Saba)	Visa not required	3 months
French Guiana and Saint Pierre and Miquelon	Visa not required	ID card valid.; Registration required for a Trite de Sejour after 90 days
(France) French West Indies	Visa not required	ID card valid.; Registration required for a Trite de Sejour after 90 days French West Indies refers to Martinique, Guadeloupe, Saint Martin and Saint Barthélemy.
Denmark (Greenland)	Visa not required	Needs a residence permit/visa for larger stays.
Puerto Rico	Visa not required	Visa not required under the Visa Waiver Program, for 90 days on arrival from overseas for 2 years. ESTA required.
U.S. Virgin Islands	Visa not required	Visa not required under the Visa Waiver Program, for 90 days on arrival from overseas for 2 years. ESTA required.
(Venezuela) Margarita Island	Visa not required	All visitors are fingerprinted.
(Colombia) (San Andrés and Leticia)	Tourist Card on arrival	Visitors arriving at Gustavo Rojas Pinilla International Airport and Alfredo Vásquez Cobo International Airport must buy tourist cards on arrival.
Ecuador (Galápagos)	Pre-registration required	Online pre-registration is required. Transit Control Card must also be obtained at the airport prior to departure.
Oceania
(Australia) Ashmore and Cartier Islands	Special authorisation required	Special authorisation required.
(Australia) Macquarie Island	Special authorisation permit	A written authorisation of the Director of National Parks and Wildlife is required.
Cook Islands	Visa not required	31 days
Niue	Visa not required	30 days
Tokelau	Entry permit required	10 days/3 months/1 year. Visitors permits/Residence permits/Work permits/Special permits granted, allow the permit holder to be in Tokelau, for up to 10 days/3 months/1 year, unless otherwise specified. Apply for a travel permit at the Tokelau office in Apia, Samoa, at least 2 weeks prior to travel. Visitors are required to hold proof of sufficient funds to cover their stay.; The amount of funds needed is NZD 1,000 - per person per month of stay or NZD 400 - if accommodation. Tokelau can only be reached by boat from Samoa, and a permit from the Samoan Immigration Authorities is required to leave and re-enter Samoa.
Norfolk Island	eVisitor	120 days; Visa is issued upon arrival for a visit of up to max stay of 120 days, for holders of a multiple entry eVisitor issued by Australia, valid 30 days beyond the period of intended stay in Norfolk Island.; From 1 July 2016 all movement between Norfolk Island and Australian mainland are considered as domestic movement, however all passenger are still required to carry passports or, for Australian citizens, some type of photographic identification and pass Customs and Immigration. Normal Australian Customs and Immigration procedures apply when entry is made from outside Australia. Passenger not carrying their passports aren't eligible to purchase duty-free goods on Norfolk Island.
Christmas Island	Visa not required	90 days; Passports and visas are not required when travelling from the Australian mainland. However, photographic identification must be produced for clearance through Customs and Immigration. Normal Australian Customs and Immigration procedures apply when entry is made from outside Australia.
Cocos (Keeling) Islands	Visa not required	90 days; Passports and visas are not required when travelling from the Australian mainland. However, photographic identification must be produced for clearance through Customs and Immigration. Normal Australian Customs and Immigration procedures apply when entry is made from outside Australia.
(Fiji) Lau Province	Special permission required	Special permission required.
(France) Clipperton Island	Special permit required	Special permit required.
French Polynesia	Visa not required	ID card valid.; Registration required for a Trite de Sejour after 90 days
New Caledonia	Visa not required	ID card valid.; Registration required for a Trite de Sejour after 90 days
France (Wallis and Futuna)	Visa not required	ID card valid.; Registration required for a Trite de Sejour after 90 days
Pitcairn Islands	Visa not required	14 days visa free and landing fee 35 USD or tax of 5 USD if not going ashore.
American Samoa	Electronic authorization	30 days
Guam	Visa not required	45 days
Northern Mariana Islands	Visa not required	45 days
United States Minor Outlying Islands	Special permits required	Special permits required for Midway Atoll, Wake Island, Johnston Atoll, Kingman Reef, Palmyra Atoll, Howland Island, Baker Island, Jarvis Island, and Navassa Island.
South Atlantic and Antarctica
Falkland Islands	Visa not required	A visitor permit is normally issued as a stamp in the passport on arrival, The maximum validity period is 1 month.
South Georgia and the South Sandwich Islands	Permit required	Pre-arrival permit from the Commissioner required (72 hours/1 month for 110/160 pounds sterling).
Antarctica	Permit required	Special permits required for British Antarctic Territory, French Southern and Antarctic Lands, Argentine Antarctica, (Australia) Australian Antarctic Territory, Bouvet Island, (Antártica Chilena Province) Chilean Antarctic Territory, (Australia) Heard Island and McDonald Islands, (Norway) Peter I Island, (Norway) Queen Maud Land, (New Zealand) Ross Dependency.

== Non-ordinary passports ==
Holders of various categories of official Italian passports have additional visa-free access to the following countries - Algeria (diplomatic or service passports), Angola (diplomatic or service passports), Azerbaijan (diplomatic or service passports), Egypt (diplomatic, official, service or special passports), Kazakhstan (diplomatic passports), Kuwait (diplomatic passports), Libya (diplomatic, official or service passports), Niger (diplomatic passports), Qatar (diplomatic, service or special passports), Uganda (diplomatic passports), Russia (diplomatic passports) and Vietnam (diplomatic passports).

Holders of diplomatic or service passports of any country have visa-free access to Cape Verde, Ethiopia, Mali and Zimbabwe.

== Right to consular protection in non-EU countries ==
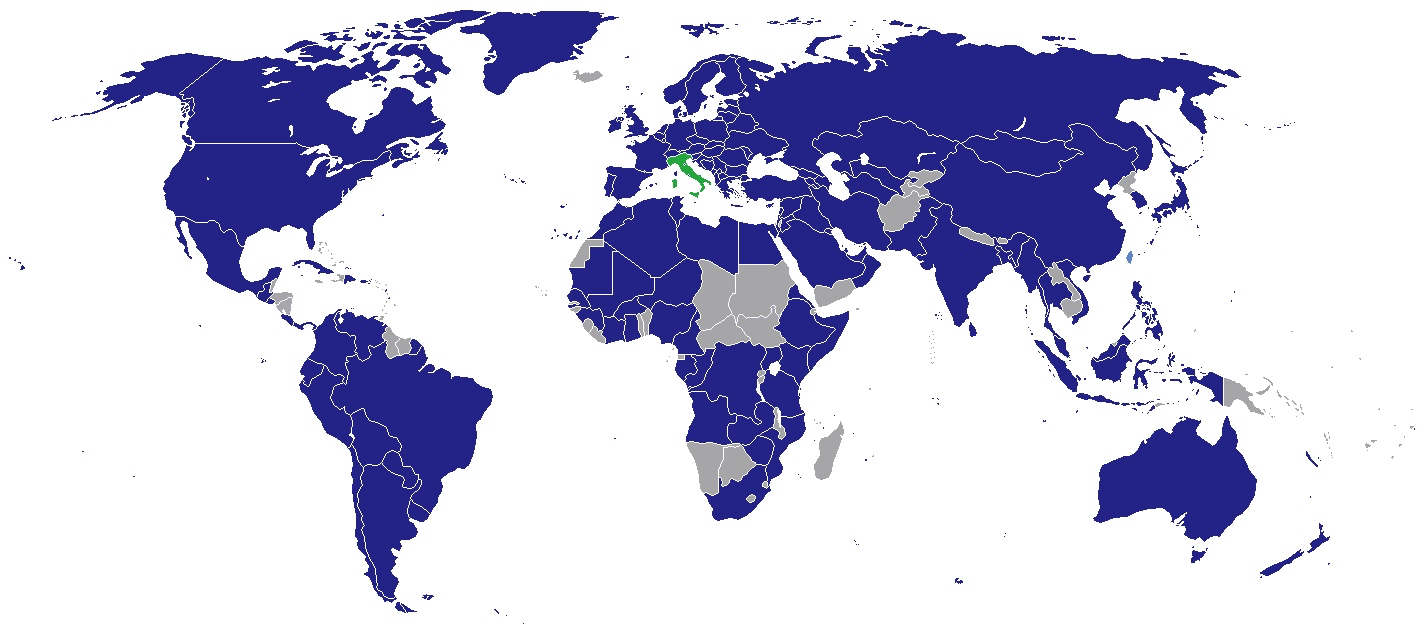
Diplomatic missions of Italy

When in a non-EU country where there is no Italian embassy Italian citizens, as EU citizens, have the right to get consular protection from the embassy of any other EU country present in that country.

See also List of diplomatic missions of Italy.

== Non-visa restrictions ==
=== Blank passport pages ===
Many countries require a minimum number of blank pages to be available in the passport being presented, typically one or two pages. Endorsement pages, which often appear after the visa pages, are not counted as being valid or available.

=== Vaccination ===
Cover of the new International Certificate of Vaccination issued by the Bureau of Quarantine in the Philippines since 2021

The African countries of Angola, Benin, Burkina Faso, Burundi, Cameroon, Central African Republic, Democratic Republic of the Congo, Republic of the Congo, Côte d'Ivoire, Gabon, Ghana, Guinea-Bissau, Mali, Niger, Sierra Leone and Togo, South Sudan and Uganda, along with French Guiana in South America, require all incoming passengers older than nine months to one year, to have a current International Certificate of Vaccination or Prophylaxis.

Some other countries require vaccination only if the passenger is coming from an infected area or has visited one recently or has transited for 12 hours in those countries: Algeria, Botswana, Cabo Verde, Chad, Djibouti, Egypt, Eswatini, Ethiopia, Gambia, Ghana, Guinea, Lesotho, Libya, Equatorial Guinea, Eritrea, Madagascar, Malawi, Mauritania, Mauritius, Mozambique, Namibia, Nigeria, Papua New Guinea, Seychelles, Somalia, South Africa, Sudan, Tunisia, Uganda, Tanzania, Zambia and Zimbabwe.

=== Passport validity length ===
Very few countries, such as Paraguay, just require a valid passport on arrival.

However many countries and groupings now require only an identity card – especially from their neighbours. Other countries may have special bilateral arrangements that depart from the generality of their passport validity length policies to shorten the period of passport validity required for each other's citizens or even accept passports that have already expired (but not been cancelled).

Some countries, such as Japan, Ireland and the United Kingdom, require a passport valid throughout the period of the intended stay.

In the absence of specific bilateral agreements, countries requiring passports to be valid for at least 6 more months on arrival include Afghanistan, Algeria, Anguilla, Bahrain, Bhutan, Botswana, British Virgin Islands, Brunei, Cambodia, Cameroon, Cape Verde, Cayman Islands, Central African Republic, Chad, Comoros, Costa Rica, Côte d'Ivoire, Curaçao, Ecuador, Egypt, El Salvador, Equatorial Guinea, Fiji, Gabon, Guinea Bissau, Guyana, Haiti, India, Indonesia, Iran, Iraq, Israel, Jordan, Kenya, Kiribati, Kuwait, Laos, Madagascar, Malaysia, Marshall Islands, Mongolia, Myanmar, Namibia, Nepal, Nicaragua, Nigeria, Oman, Palau, Papua New Guinea, Peru, Philippines, Qatar, Rwanda, Samoa, Saudi Arabia, Singapore, Solomon Islands, Somalia, Sri Lanka, Sudan, Suriname, Tanzania, Thailand, Timor-Leste, Tokelau, Tonga, Turkey, Tuvalu, Uganda, United Arab Emirates, Vanuatu, Venezuela, and Vietnam.

Countries requiring passports valid for at least 4 months on arrival include Micronesia and Zambia.

Countries requiring passports with a validity of at least 3 months beyond the date of intended departure include Azerbaijan, Bosnia and Herzegovina, Honduras, Montenegro, Nauru, Moldova and New Zealand. Similarly, the EEA countries of Iceland, Liechtenstein, Norway, all European Union countries (except Ireland) together with Switzerland also require 3 months validity beyond the date of the bearer's intended departure unless the bearer is an EEA or Swiss national.

Countries requiring passports valid for at least 3 months on arrival include Albania, North Macedonia, Panama, and Senegal.

Bermuda requires passports to be valid for at least 45 days upon entry.

Countries that require a passport validity of at least one month beyond the date of intended departure include Eritrea, Hong Kong, Lebanon, Macau, the Maldives and South Africa.

==== Maximum passport age ====
Countries of the Schengen area require non-EU passports to be less than 10 years old upon entry.

=== Criminal record ===
Some countries, including Australia, Canada, Fiji, New Zealand and the United States, routinely deny entry to non-citizens who have a criminal record, while others impose restrictions depending on the type of conviction and the length of the sentence.

=== Persona non grata ===
The government of a country can declare a diplomat persona non grata, banning them from entering the country or expelling them if they have already entered. In non-diplomatic use, the authorities of a country may also declare a foreigner persona non grata permanently or temporarily, usually because of unlawful activity.

=== Israeli stamps ===
Kuwait, Lebanon, Libya, and Yemen do not allow entry to people with passport stamps from Israel or whose passports have either a used or an unused Israeli visa, or where there is evidence of previous travel to Israel such as entry or exit stamps from neighbouring border posts in transit countries such as Jordan and Egypt.

To circumvent this Arab League boycott of Israel, the Israeli immigration services have now mostly ceased to stamp foreign nationals' passports on either entry to or exit from Israel (unless the entry is for some work-related purposes). Since 15 January 2013, Israel no longer stamps foreign passports at Ben Gurion Airport. Passports are still (as of 22 June 2017) stamped at Erez when passing into and out of Gaza.

Iran refuses admission to holders of passports containing an Israeli visa or stamp that is less than 12 months old.

=== Biometrics ===
Several countries mandate that all travellers, or all foreign travellers, be fingerprinted on arrival and will refuse admission to or even arrest travellers who refuse to comply. In some countries, such as the United States, this may apply even to transit passengers who merely wish to change planes rather than go landside.

Fingerprinting countries/regions include Afghanistan, Argentina, Brunei, Cambodia, China, Ethiopia, Ghana, Guinea, India, Japan, Kenya (both fingerprints and a photo are taken), Malaysia upon entry and departure, Mongolia, Saudi Arabia, the Schengen Area, Singapore, South Korea, Taiwan, Thailand, Uganda, the United Arab Emirates and the United States.

Many countries also require a photo be taken of people entering the country. The United States, which does not fully implement exit control formalities at its land frontiers (although long mandated by its own legislation), intends to implement facial recognition for passengers departing from international airports to identify people who overstay their visa.

Together with fingerprint and face recognition, iris scanning is one of three biometric identification technologies internationally standardised since 2006 by the International Civil Aviation Organization (ICAO) for use in e-passports and the United Arab Emirates conducts iris scanning on visitors who need to apply for a visa. The United States Department of Homeland Security has announced plans to greatly increase the biometric data it collects at US borders. In 2018, Singapore began trials of iris scanning at three land and maritime immigration checkpoints.

== See also ==
- Italian passport
- Italian electronic identity card
