= Italian passport =

Passport issued to Italian nationals

Italian passport; Passaporto italiano
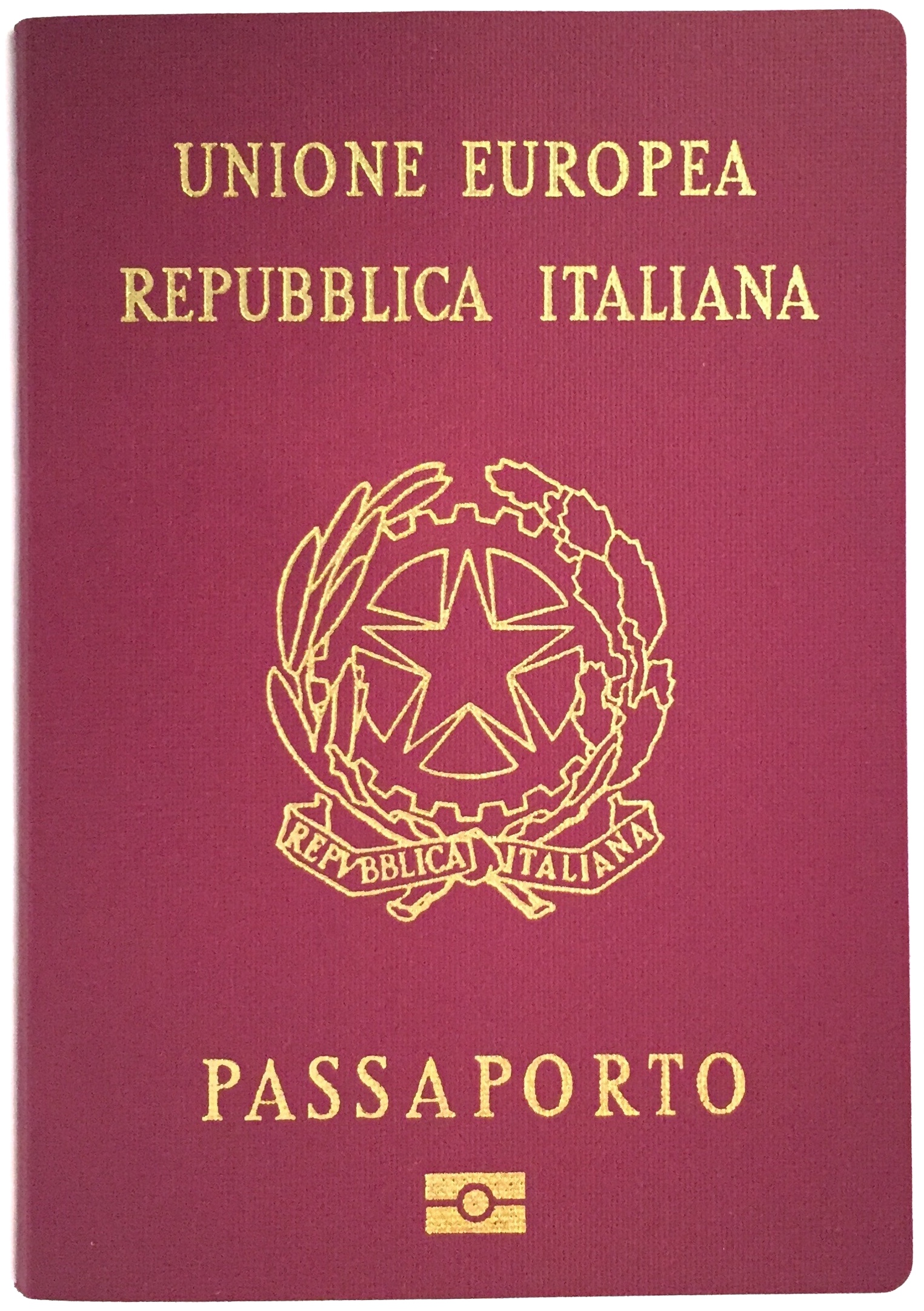
- The front cover of a contemporary Italian biometric passport

- The biodata page of an Italian biometric passport
- Type: Passport
- Issued by: Polizia di Stato (on behalf of the Ministry of Foreign Affairs)
- First issued: 1946 (First Republic); 1 January 1985 (first EU format); 26 October 2006 (biometric passport); 27 September 2023 (current version)
- Purpose: Identification
- Eligibility: Italian citizenship
- Expiration: 10 years after issuance (for adults); 5 years (for minors aged 3–17); 3 years (for children aged 0–3)
- Cost: €116

Inside cover of an Italian biometric passport issued in 2006

An Italian passport (Italian: passaporto italiano) is issued upon request to an Italian citizen for the purpose of international travel. It is valid for 10, 5 or 3 years, depending on the applicant's age. Its biometric version has been available since 2006.

Every Italian citizen is also a citizen of the European Union. The passport, along with the national identity card, allows for free movement and residence in any EU member state, in the European Economic Area and in Switzerland.

According to the Henley Passport Index, in 2026, with 185 countries with "Visa-free" access (including "Visa on arrival" and "Electronic Travel Authorization" - eTA) it is the fourth strongest passport in the world tied with eleven other countries.

== Physical appearance ==
Italian passports share the common design of EU Passports: they are burgundy-coloured, with the Emblem of Italy emblazoned in the center of the front cover. The word "Passaporto", meaning passport, is inscribed below the emblem and "Unione Europea" (English: European Union), "Repubblica Italiana" (English: Italian Republic) above. The biometry symbol appears right below "Passaporto" in the centre. The current version of the passport contains 48 pages.

=== Identity information page ===
The biodata are on page 2 of the passport, and include the following:

- Photo of Passport Holder
- Type
- Code of Issuing State (ITA)
- Passport No.
- Surname (1)
- Given Names (2)
- Nationality (3)
- Date of Birth (4)
- Sex (5)
- Place of Birth (6)
- Date of Issue (7)
- Date of Expiration (8)
- Authority (9)
- Holder's signature (10)

The information page ends with the Machine Readable Zone.

=== Languages ===
The data page is printed in Italian (Mandatory), English and French. Further translation is provided on page 6, in all 23 official languages of the European Union.

== Visa requirements map ==
Visa requirements for Italian citizens Italy Freedom of movement Visa not required / ESTA / eTA / eVisitor eVisa Visa available both on arrival or online Visa on arrival Visa required prior to arrival

Visa requirements for Italian citizens are administrative entry restrictions by the authorities of other states placed on citizens of Italy. As of March 2026, Italian citizens had visa-free or visa on arrival access to 185 countries and territories, ranking the Italian passport 4th in terms of travel freedom (tied with eleven other countries) according to the Henley Passport Index.

== Issuing ==
The Italian passport is issued by the Minister of Foreign Affairs, through

- Questure (State Police provincial offices) in Italy
- Italian consulates and embassies abroad

Italian citizens can only apply online on the official Police website. Since the introduction of biometric passports in 2006, applicants should appear in person at the Police offices to have fingerprints collected; children under 12 are exempt, but should appear in person nonetheless.

The current fee for a standard 10-year biometric passport is €116. The requirement to attach an annual revenue stamp inside the passport was canceled in 2014.

== Multiple passports ==
Italians are allowed to have two valid passports, but are not allowed to possess them simultaneously. One passport will have to be stored in a Questura (provincial headquarters of the State Police) or consulate.

The issuing agent will only issue two passports if Italian nationals have a valid reason, one example being that some countries in the Arab League do not allow entry to passport holders of any nationality with Israeli visas or passport stamps, requiring a second passport.

== Gallery of historic images ==
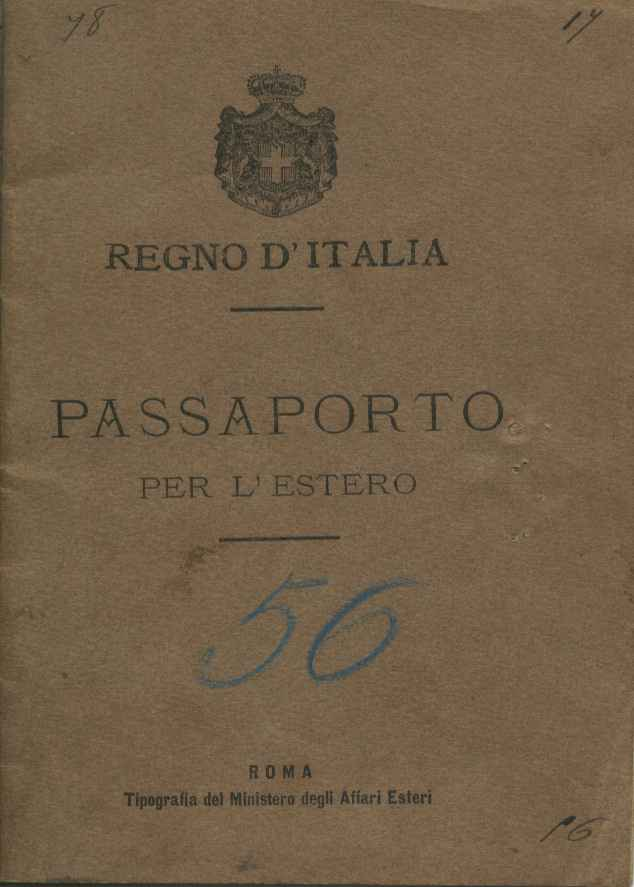
Cover of passport issued in 1901

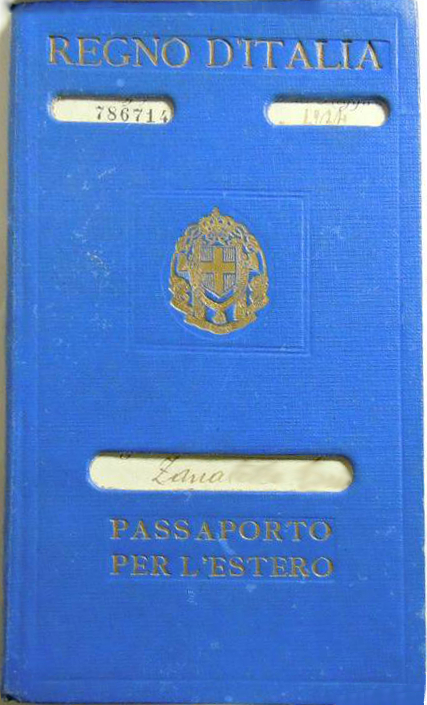
Cover of passport issued in 1938

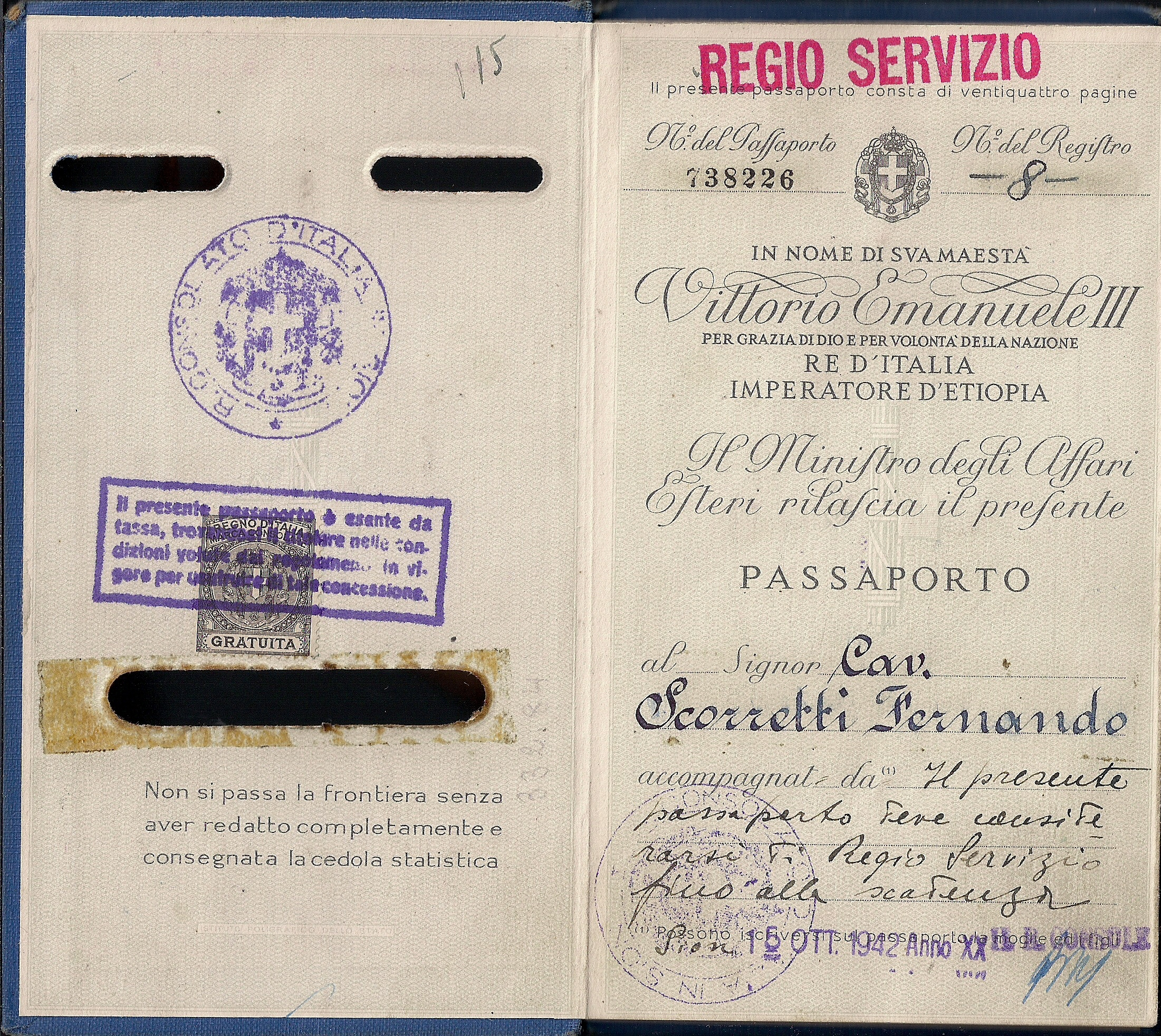
1938 Italian regular passport changed during the war to a SERVICE passport

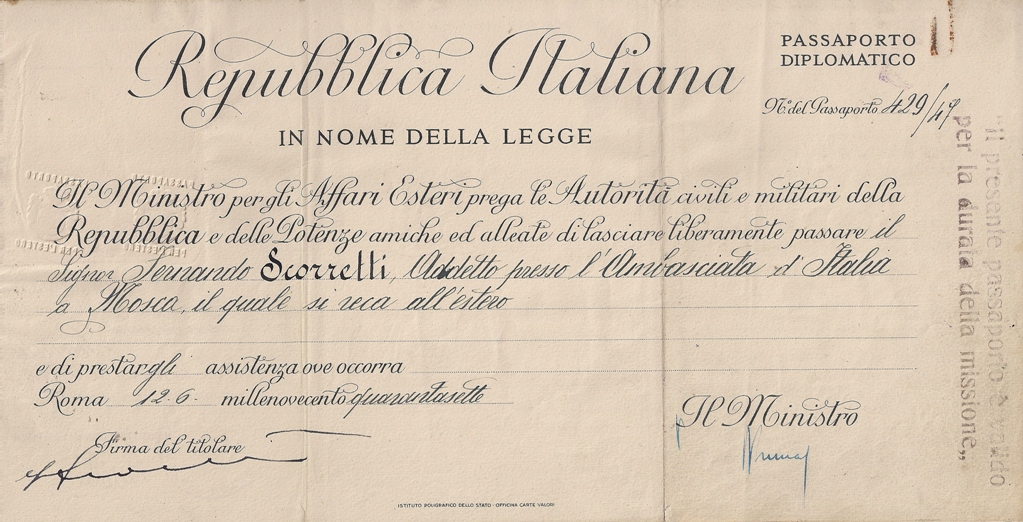
1947 Italian Diplomatic passport used for Moscow

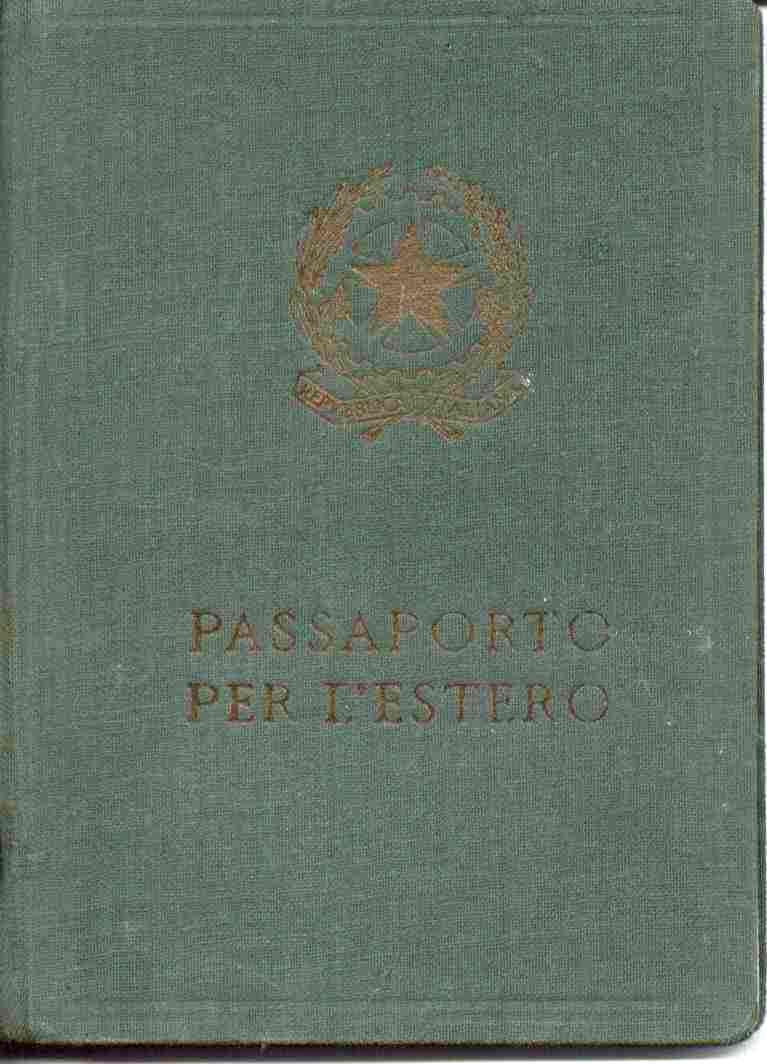
Cover of passport issued in 1953

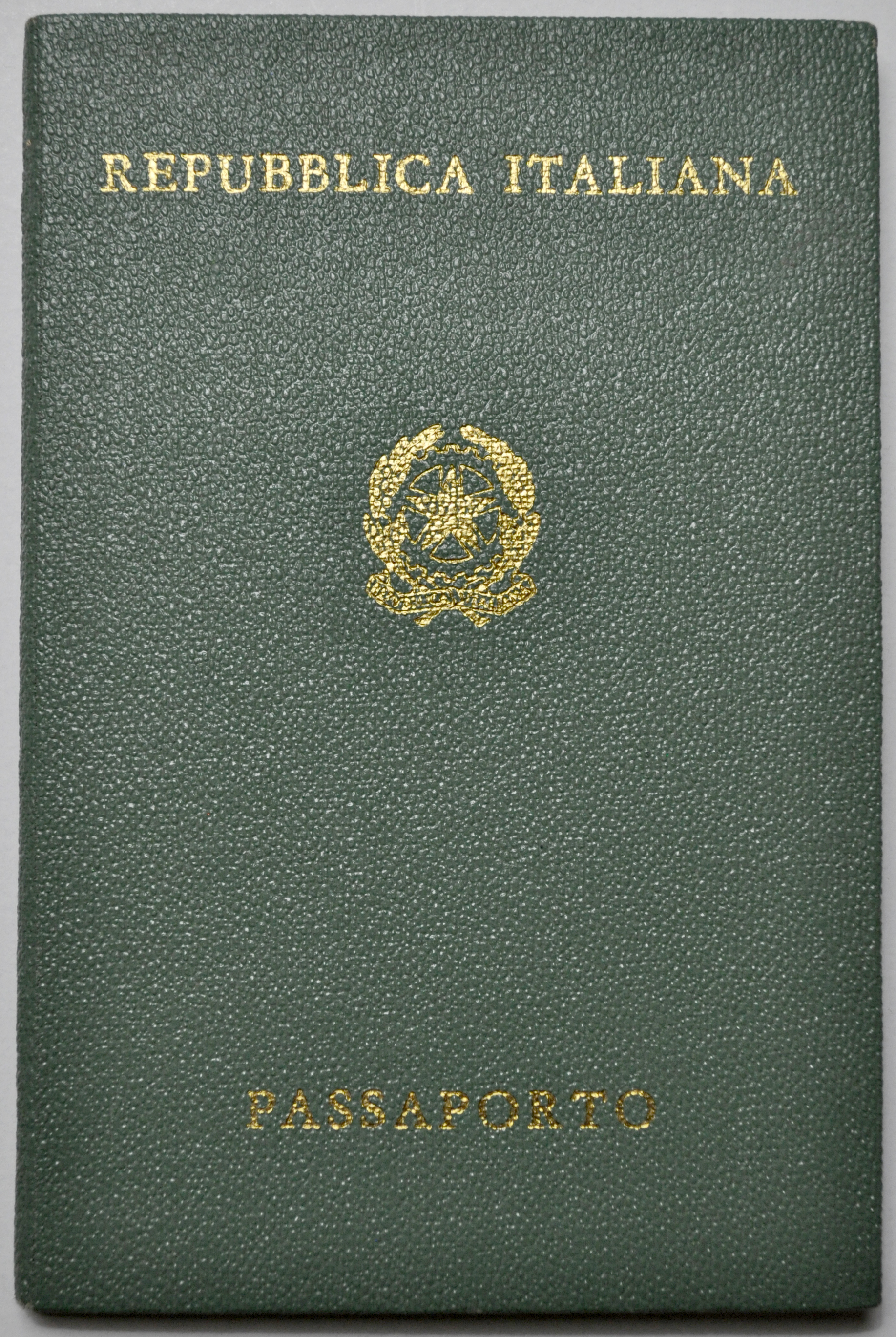
Cover of passport issued in 1966

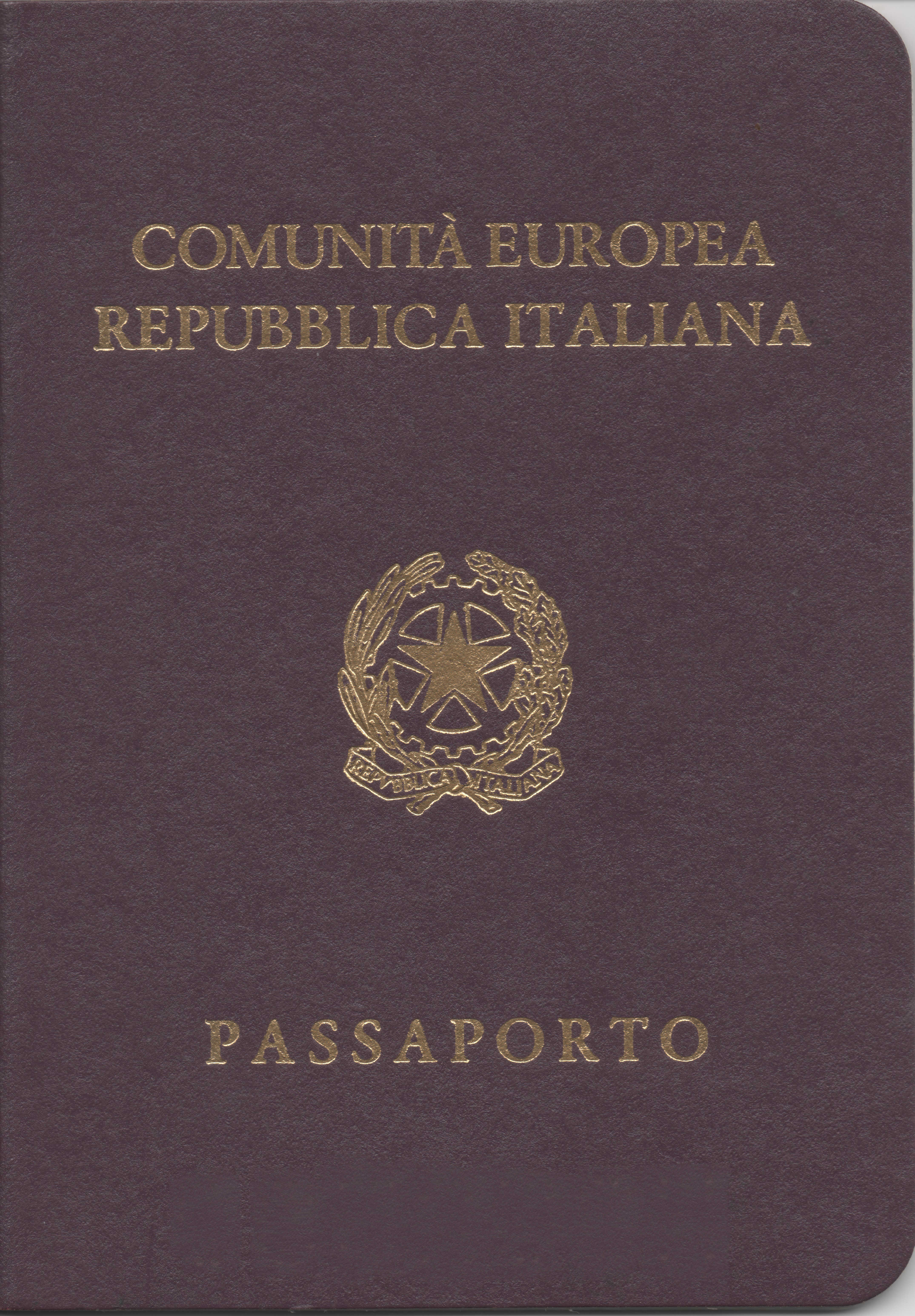
Cover of passport as issued from 1985 to 1998

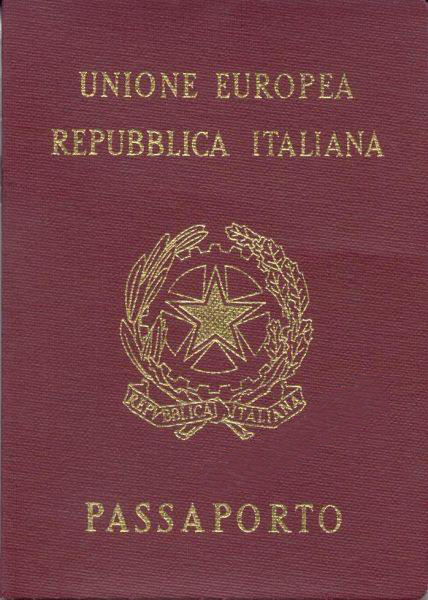
Cover of passport as issued from 1998 to 2006

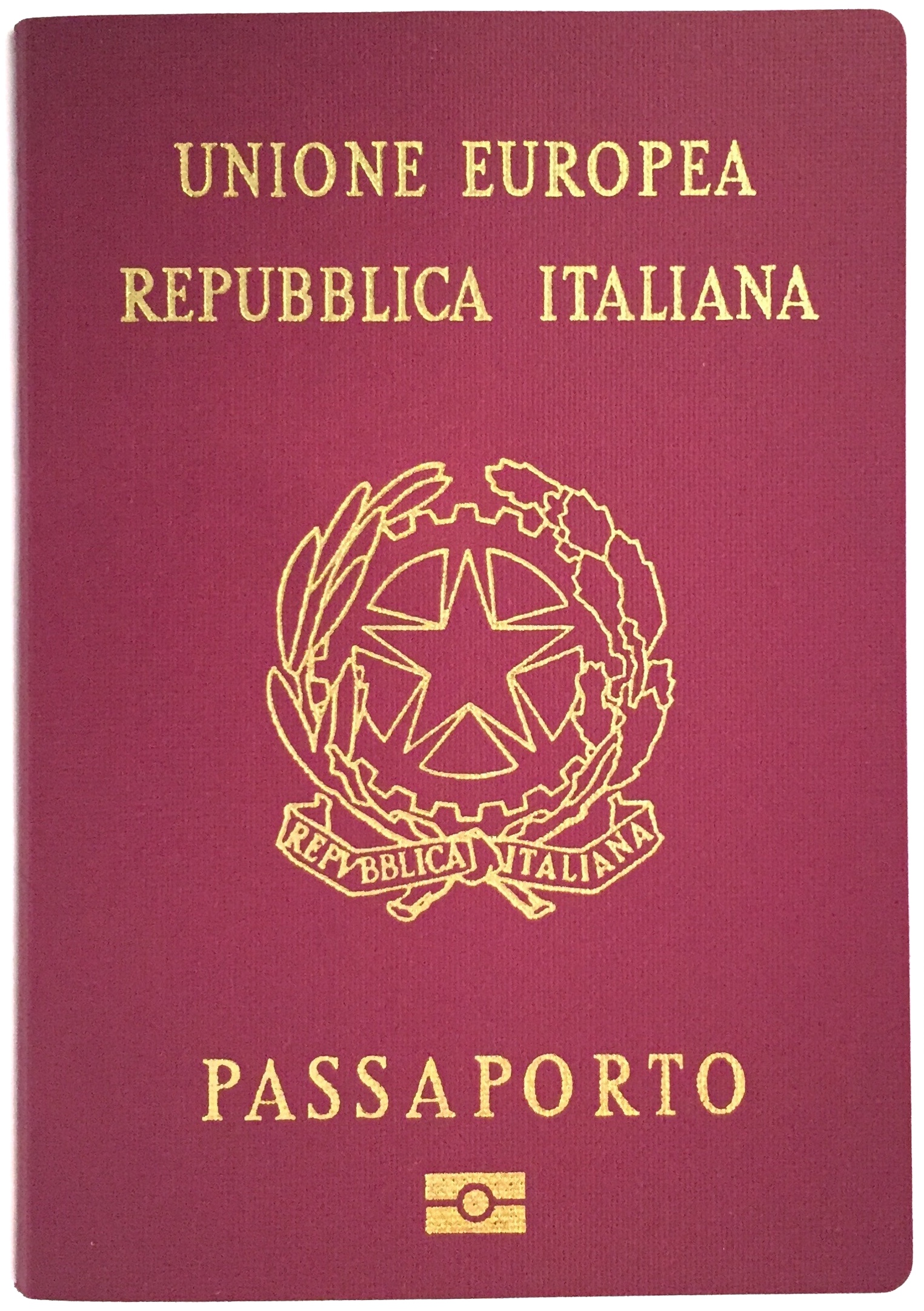
Cover of passport as issued from 2010 onwards

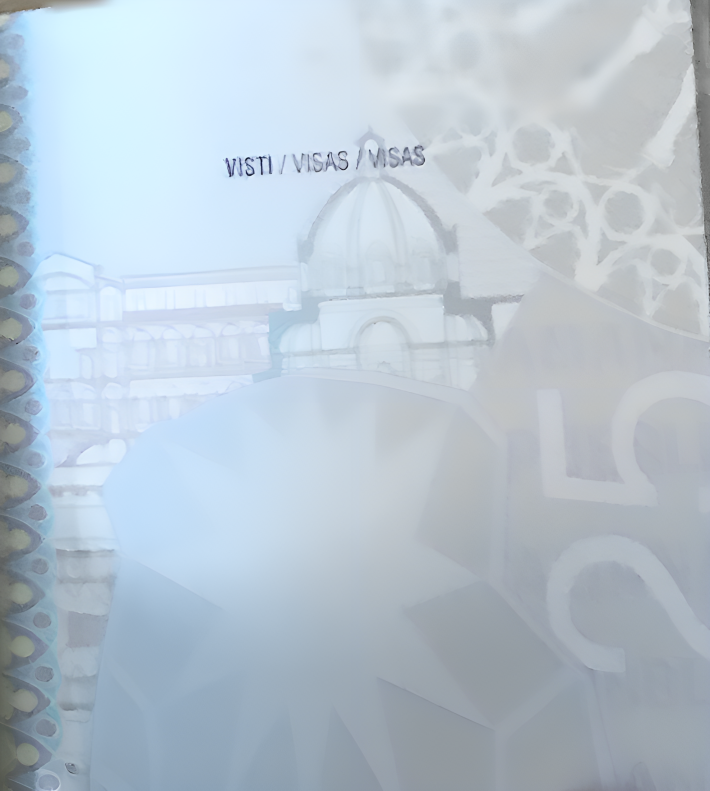
An image of an Italian passport with "VISTI/VISAS/VISAS" in bold. The passport number has been blurred to protect the individual's identity.

== See also ==
- Passports of the European Union
- Italian nationality law
- Italian electronic identity card
- Visa requirements for Italian citizens
- Visa policy of the Schengen Area
