= Italian nationality law =

New rules on citizenship Nuove norme sulla cittadinanza

Italian Parliament
- Long title: Provisions regarding new rules on citizenship
- Citation: Law No. 91 of 1992
- Territorial extent: Italy
- Enacted by: Senate of the Republic
- Enacted by: Chamber of Deputies
- Signed by: Francesco Cossiga, President of Italy
- Signed: 5 February 1992
- Commenced: 16 August 1992
- Administered by: Ministry of the Interior

Legislative history

Initiating chamber: Senate of the Republic
- Introduced by: Giulio Andreotti, Minister of Foreign Affairs
- Passed: 23 May 1991

Revising chamber: Chamber of Deputies
- Passed: 14 January 1992
- Status: Amended

The primary law governing nationality of Italy is Law 91/1992, which came into force on 16 August 1992. Italy is a member state of the European Union (EU), and all Italian nationals are EU citizens. They are entitled to free movement rights in EU and European Free Trade Association (EFTA) countries, and may vote in elections to the European Parliament.

== Terminology ==
The distinction between citizenship and nationality is not always clear in the English language and differs by country. Generally, nationality refers to a person's legal belonging to a sovereign state and is the common term used in international treaties when addressing members of a country, while citizenship usually means the set of rights and duties a person has in that nation.

In Italian, the term "citizenship" (cittadinanza) refers to membership in a political community while "nationality" (nazionalità) can indicate a person's belonging to an ethnic or cultural group. While both terms are used in legislation when dealing with national status, "citizenship" is used more frequently.

== History ==
=== Italian unification ===
Before Italian unification in the mid-19th century, the Italian Peninsula was divided between several Italian monarchies, the Papal States, and the Austrian Empire. The Kingdom of Sardinia partially unified the region and proclaimed the Kingdom of Italy in 1861, before fully unifying the peninsula with the capture of Rome in 1870.

Prior to unification, the Kingdom of Sardinia adopted the Statuto Albertino as its constitution in 1848. This piece of legislation established a basic set of political rights for male citizens, including the right to vote in elections and eligibility for public office. Under this statute, children of Sardinian fathers born overseas were Sardinian subjects. Male children who were Sardinian subjects by birth were required to return to the kingdom within three years of reaching the age of majority to fulfill a mandatory military service requirement in order to retain their Sardinian status. Foreigners could naturalise as Sardinian subjects by application to the sovereign, and foreign women who married Sardinian men automatically acquired subject status at the time of their marriage. Children born in state territory to foreign parents permanently domiciled in the kingdom were considered to be subjects by birth.

Although the law addressed acquisition and loss of subject status for cases involving foreign residence or marriage, it lacked a definition for who held Sardinian citizenship at the time of the law's adoption and instead assumed that virtually all of the population were naturally members of the state. Following the Italian kingdom's proclamation in 1861, a new Civil Code was enacted in 1865 that included provisions clarifying Italian citizenship acquisition. This legislation codified jus sanguinis as the primary basis through which citizenship is acquired; any individual born to an Italian father automatically acquired Italian citizenship by descent.

=== Law no. 555 of 1912 ===
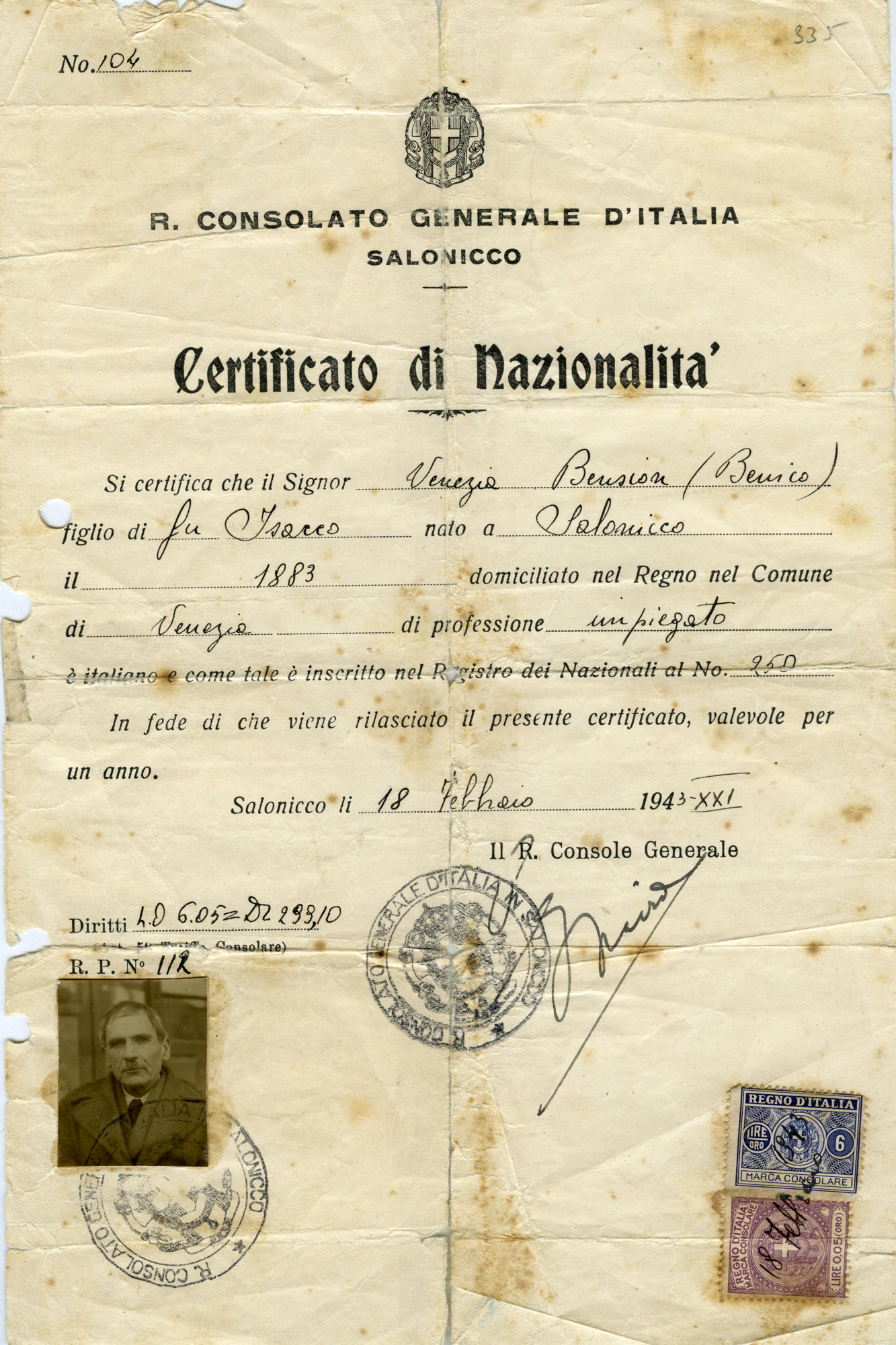
Certificate of Italian nationality issued to Benzion Venezia in 1943 by the Italian consulate in Thessaloniki, German-occupied Greece

On 13 June 1912, Law number 555, concerning citizenship, was passed, and it took effect on 1 July 1912.

Despite the fact that the Statuto Albertino did not make any reference to equality or inequality between the sexes, the precept of the wife's subordination to the husband—one having ancient antecedents—was prevalent in the basic legal system (the legislative meaning). There are numerous examples in the codified law, such as article 144 of the Civil Code of 1939 and, specifically, law number 555 of 13 June 1912 "On Italian Citizenship". Law 555 established the primacy of the husband in the marriage and the subordination of the wife and the children to his events pertinent to his citizenship. It established:

- That jus sanguinis was the guiding principle, and that jus soli was an ancillary possibility.
- The children followed the citizenship of the father, and only in certain cases, the citizenship of the mother. The mother could transmit the citizenship to her children born before 1 January 1948 (the effective date of entry of the Constitution of the Italian Republic) only in the special cases found in paragraph 2 of article 1 of this statute: These cases arose if the father was unknown, if he was stateless, or if the children could not share the father's foreign citizenship according to the law of his county (as in cases where the father belonged to a country where citizenship was possible by jus soli but not by jus sanguinis). In this last situation, the Ministry of the Interior holds that if the child received jus soli citizenship of the foreign country where he was born, the mother's Italian citizenship did not pass to the child, just as in situations where the child received the father's citizenship by jus sanguinis.
- Women lost their original Italian citizenship if they married a foreign husband whose country's laws gave its citizenship to the wife, as a direct and immediate effect of the marriage. (This is a situation under review, since article 10 of this statute providing for the automatic loss of citizenship by marriage is in contrast with the second paragraph of article 8, having global scope, which does not approve of the automatic loss of citizenship by foreign naturalisation. The loss of citizenship under article 8 is not considered automatic because the voluntary acceptance of a new citizenship must have been manifested by the person naturalising for Italian citizenship to be lost pursuant to article 8).

==== Dual citizenship under law no. 555 of 1912 ====
Of central importance for the diaspora of Italians in many countries, as it relates to the holding of Italian citizenship alongside another citizenship, is article 7 of law number 555 of 1912. The provisions of this article gave immunity to some living Italian children from the citizenship events of their fathers. If the child was born to an Italian father in a jus soli country, the child was born with the Italian citizenship of the father and also with the citizenship of the country where he or she was born. That is to say that the child was born as a dual citizen. Children born with dual citizenship in this form were allowed to maintain their dual status in case the father naturalised later, thus parting with his Italian citizenship. Moreover, Italy has not imposed limitations on the number of generations of its citizens who might be born outside Italy, even as holders of citizenship foreign to Italy.

Article 7 reads:

"Except in the case of special provisions to be stipulated by international treaties, an Italian citizen born and residing in a foreign nation, which considers him to be a citizen of its own by birth, still retains Italian citizenship, but he may abandon it when he becomes of age or emancipated."

Since Italian laws in this time were very sensitive to gender, it remains to be stated that the benefit of article 7 was extended to both male and female children. A girl of minor age could keep her Italian citizenship in accordance with article 7 after the naturalisation of her father—but she still might not be able to pass her own citizenship to her children, particularly if they were born before 1948.

Law 555 of 1912 contains a provision causing the Italian children of Italian widows to retain their Italian citizenship if the widow should acquire a new citizenship by remarrying, to be found in article 12. The children concerned could keep their Italian citizenship even if they received a new one by derivation from the mother when the remarriage occurred.

Foreign women contracting marriage with Italian men before 27 April 1983 automatically became Italian citizens. If a woman's acquisition of Italian citizenship by marriage did not produce an effect upon the woman's citizenship in her country of origin, she was therefore a dual citizen. Article 10 of law 555 of 1912 provided that a married woman could not assume a citizenship different from that of her husband. If an Italian woman acquired a new citizenship while her husband remained Italian, she was a dual citizen, and law 555 of 1912 was not cognisant of her new status in the state where she acquired citizenship during her marriage.

==== Loss of Italian citizenship under law no. 555 of 1912 ====
Italian citizenship could be lost:

- By a man or woman, being of competent legal age (21 years if before 10 March 1975 or 18 years if after 9 March 1975), who of his or her own volition naturalised in another country and resided outside of Italy. (article 8) Italian citizen women married to Italian citizen husbands could not lose their citizenship if the husband's Italian citizenship was retained. (article 10)
- By the minor and unemancipated child—without the immunities from loss to be found in articles 7 and 12 (child with jus soli citizenship or child of remarried widow with consequent new citizenship)—who, residing outside of Italy, held a non-Italian citizenship and lived with a father (or mother if the father was dead) whose Italian citizenship was also lost. (article 12)
- By the woman whose Italian citizenship was a consequence of marriage to an Italian citizen, if upon becoming widowed or divorced, she returned to (or remained in) the country of her origin to live there as a citizen. (article 10) This scenario of loss was possible only before the date 27 April 1983.
- By the citizen who accepted employment with or rendered military service to a foreign state, and was expressly ordered by the Italian government to abandon this activity before a deadline, and still persisted in it after the said deadline. (article 8) This kind of loss was rather uncommon, and could only occur if the Italian government contacted the citizen whose abandonment of service to a foreign government was demanded.

Loss of Italian citizenship carried with it the inability to pass Italian citizenship automatically to children born during the period of not holding the citizenship. Still, Italian citizenship could sometimes be acquired by children of former citizens reacquiring the citizenship. Because law 555 of 1912 underwent revision to meet the republican constitution's requirement that the sexes be equal before the law, a determination of citizenship for a child involves an analysis of the events of both parents and possibly the ascendants of both.

=== The 1948 Constitution of the Republic ===
The constitution of the Italian Republic entered into effect on 1 January 1948. With the Salerno Pact in April 1944, stipulated between the National Liberation Committee and the Monarchy, the referendum on being governed by a monarchy or a republic was postponed until the end of the war. The 1848 constitution of the Kingdom of Italy was still formally in force at this time, since the laws that had limited it were, to some extent, abolished on 25 July 1943 (date of the collapse of the fascist regime). The referendum was held on 2 June 1946. All Italian men and women 21 years of age and older were called to vote on two ballots: one of these being the Institutional Referendum on the choice between a monarchy and a republic, the other being for the delegation of 556 deputies to the Constituent Assembly.

The current Italian constitution was approved by the Constituent Assembly on 22 December 1947, published in the Official Gazette on 27 December 1947, and entered into effect on 1 January 1948. The original text has undergone parliamentary revisions.

A Democratic Republic was instituted, based on the deliberations and sovereignty of the people. Individual rights were recognised, as well as those of the body public, whose basis was the fulfilment of binding obligations of political, economic, and social solidarity (articles 1 and 2).

The fundamental articles that were eventually used to support new arguments concerning citizenship are as follows:

Article 3, a part of the constitution's "Fundamental Principles", has two clauses.

- The first clause establishes the equality of all citizens: "All citizens have equal social dignity and are equal before the law, without distinction of sex, race, language, religion, political opinions, personal and social conditions."
- The second clause, supplementary to the first and no less important, adds: "It is the duty of the Republic to remove those obstacles of an economic and social nature which, really limiting the freedom and equality of citizens, impede the full development of the human person and the effective participation of all workers in the political, economic and social organisation of the country."

Article 29, under Title II, "Ethical and Social Relations", reads: "The Republic recognises the rights of the family as a natural society founded on matrimony." The second clause establishes the equality between spouses: "Matrimony is based on the moral and legal equality of the spouses within the limits laid down by law to guarantee the unity of the family."

Another article of fundamental importance here is article 136, under Title VI, "Constitutional Guarantees - Section I - The Constitutional Court", reading as follows: "When the Court declares the constitutional illegitimacy of a law or enactment having the force of law, the law ceases to have effect from the day following the publication of the decision." Moreover, relating to this article, still with pertinence to citizenship, the second clause is very important: "The decision of the Court shall be published and communicated to the Houses and to the regional councils concerned, so that, wherever they deem it necessary, they shall act in conformity with constitutional procedures."

=== Decisions of the Constitutional Court and laws enacted in consequence ===
In summary, law 555 of 1912 has been superseded by new laws and rulings so that:

- The child born on or after 1 January 1948 to an Italian man or woman is to be considered Italian by birth (except as provided in some treaties).
- An Italian woman's marriage to an alien, or her husband's loss of Italian citizenship, has not caused the woman's Italian citizenship to change if the marriage or husband's naturalisation came on or after 1 January 1948. If the same event were prior to 1 January 1948, the Italian consulates and municipalities may not deem her citizenship uninterrupted. In the latter case, the possibility remains that the matter of her continued holding of Italian citizenship will be confirmed in court.
- All minor children of at least one Italian citizen parent, including an adoptive parent, as of the date 27 April 1983 who did not already have Italian citizenship received Italian citizenship on this date.
- Also beginning on 27 April 1983, the Italian law ceased to prescribe automatic Italian citizenship for foreign women marrying Italian citizen husbands.

==== Decision no. 87 of 1975 ====
This decision, in summary, finds that it is unconstitutional for women to be deprived of their Italian citizenship if they acquired a new citizenship automatically by marriage. Italy has officially expressed that the benefit of this decision extends retroactively to marriages as early as 1 January 1948.

The constitution of the Republic stayed unimplemented, in the matter of citizenship, from the time of its enactment until the year 1983. Notwithstanding the equality determined by articles 3 and 29 of the constitution, the Parliament did not put forth any law modifying the absence of code law which would allow the child of an Italian citizen mother and an alien father to have Italian citizenship by jus sanguinis.

The decision rendered on 9 April 1975, number 87, by the Constitutional Court, declared the unconstitutionality of article 10, third paragraph, in the part which foresaw a woman's loss of citizenship independently from her free will.

Among the essential points of the decision, it was pointed out that article 10 was inspired by the very widespread concept in 1912 that women were legally inferior to men, and as individuals, did not have full legal capacity. Such a concept was not represented by, and moreover was in disagreement with, the principles of the constitution. In addition, the law, by stipulating a loss of citizenship reserved exclusively for women, undoubtedly created an unjust and irrational disparity in treatment between spouses, especially if the will of the woman was not questioned or if the loss of citizenship occurred contrarily to her intentions.

==== Law no. 151 of 1975 ====
In summary, this law impacts citizenship by confirming decision 87 of 1975 for marriages happening after its entry into effect, and authorizing women who lost the Italian citizenship automatically by receiving a new citizenship as a consequence of marriage to reacquire it with a petition. While this law did not state the capability of decision 87/1975 to retroact, the decision's accepted retroactive application back as far as 1 January 1948 is on the merit of the constitution. In the larger picture, law 151 of 1975 was an extensive remodeling of family law in Italy.

As a result of the finding of unconstitutionality in decision 87/1975, within the scope of Italy's reform of family law in 1975, article 219 was introduced into law 151 of 1975 which sanctioned for women the "reacquisition" (more properly, recognition) of citizenship. Article 219 reads:

"The woman who, by effect of marriage to an alien or because of a change in citizenship on the part of her husband, has lost the Italian citizenship before the entry of this law into effect, may reacquire it with a declaration made before the competent authority in article 36 on the provisions of implementing the civil code. Every rule of the law 555 of 13 June 1912 which is incompatible with the provisions of this present law stands repealed."

The term "reacquisition" appears improper inasmuch as the Constitutional Court's decision pronounced that the citizenship was never lost by the women concerned, and that there was never a willingness to this end on their part, and thus the term "recognition" seems more proper academically and legally.

==== Decision no. 30 of 1983 ====
Decision number 30 of 1983 is the finding that transmitting Italian citizenship by birth is a constitutional right of women, and the decision retroacts for births beginning as early as 1 January 1948. The mother must have been holding Italian citizenship when the child was born for the transmission to occur as a consequence of this rule.

Decision number 30 was pronounced on 28 January 1983, deposited in chancellery on 9 February 1983, and published in "Official Gazette" number 46 on 16 February 1983. The question of unconstitutionality of article 1 of law 555 of 1912 was posed "where it does not foresee that the child of an Italian citizen mother having kept her citizenship even after her marriage to a foreigner, also has Italian citizenship". The decision determined that the first clause of article 1 of this law was in clear contrast with the constitution's articles 3 (first paragraph—equality before the law without regard to sex, etc.) and 29 (second paragraph—moral and juridical parity between spouses). The Constitutional Court not only declared article 1 of law 555 of 13 June 1912 unconstitutional where it did not foresee the Italian citizenship of the child of an Italian citizen mother; but also article 2 of the same law where it sanctions a child's acquisition of a mother's citizenship only in limited cases, since thereafter those limitations were lifted and mothers could generally pass Italian citizenship to their children.

==== Opinion no. 105 of 1983 from the State Council ====
The opinion number 105 of 15 April 1983; given by the State Council, Section V, in a consultative session; determined that by effect of Decision 30 of 1983 by the Constitutional Court, the individuals born to an Italian citizen mother only as far back as 1 January 1948 could be considered Italian citizens, on the premise that the effectiveness of the decision could not retroact further than the moment when the contradiction between the old law and the new constitution emerged, which was 1 January 1948, the date of the constitution's entry into effect.

==== Law no. 123 of 1983 ====
This law granted automatic Italian citizenship to minor children (under age 18) of at least one parent holding Italian citizenship on its entry date into effect (27 April 1983). The law ended the practice of granting automatic citizenship to women by marriage. The law gave an obligation to dual citizens to opt for a single citizenship while 18 years of age.

On 21 April 1983, law number 123 was passed, which established that all minor children of an Italian citizen father or mother, including an adoptive parent, were Italian citizens by birth. In the case of dual citizenship, the child was required to select a single citizenship within one year after reaching the age of majority (article 5) — unless the non-Italian citizenship was acquired through birth in a jus soli country, according to a 1990 Council of State opinion. The law is understood to have extended Italian citizenship to all minor children of Italian citizens at the moment of the law's entry into effect, even if the children were adopted. The same law repeals the prior rule prescribing automatic acquisition of Italian citizenship jure matrimonis by alien women who contracted marriage with an Italian citizen husband. Thus since the date of entry into force (27 April), the equality of foreign spouses before the Italian law was instituted, and the cardinal principle of acquisition of citizenship through one's expression of free will was reasserted.

==== Loss of Italian citizenship under law no. 123 of 1983 ====
With the entry of law 123 of 1983 into effect on 27 April 1983, Italy instituted a requirement of selecting a single citizenship among those Italians with multiple citizenship reaching the age of majority on or after 27 April 1983. The selection was due within one year. If the selection of Italian citizenship was not made, there was the potential for the Italian citizenship to be lost.

The government's orientation toward this rule is that those dual citizens whose foreign nationality came by birth in states attributing their jus soli citizenship to them were exempt from the requirement, because this law did not repeal the still effective article 7 of law 555 of 1912. The government has also clarified that children born to Italian mothers foreign naturalised as an automatic result of a marriage contracted on or after 1 January 1948 are also exempt from the requirement.

The requirement was repealed on 18 May 1986, and so it was given only to people born between 27 April 1965 and 17 May 1967. Between 18 May 1986 and 14 August 1994, people subject to the requirement were entitled to make belated selections of Italian citizenship, or amend previously made selections of foreign citizenship.

=== European integration ===
Italian involvement in European integration began in the immediate post-war period of the late 1940s. Initial cooperation was focused on the economy through the Organisation for European Economic Co-operation as a condition for receiving aid from the United States provided by the Marshall Plan. The post-war political situation created the circumstances that facilitated the establishment of further organisations to integrate Western Europe along common social and security policies. Italy became a founding member of the European Communities (EC) in 1951, a set of organisations that eventually developed into the European Union (EU). Italian citizens participated in their first European Parliament elections in 1979 and have been able to work in other EC/EU countries under the freedom of movement for workers established by the 1957 Treaty of Rome. With the creation of European Union citizenship by the 1992 Maastricht Treaty, free movement rights were extended to all nationals of EU member states regardless of their employment status. The scope of these rights was further expanded with the establishment of the European Economic Area in 1994 to include any national of an EFTA member state except for Switzerland, which concluded a separate free movement agreement with the EU that came into force in 2002. Liechtenstein exceptionally maintains immigration controls on EEA/Swiss citizens despite its EEA membership due to the country's small geographic and population size.

=== Law no. 91 of 1992 ===
Law number 91, passed on 5 February 1992, establishes that the following persons are citizens by birth:

a) The child of a citizen father or mother.
b) Whoever is born within the Republic's territory if both parents are stateless or unknown, or if the child's citizenship does not follow that of the parents, pursuant to the law of their country. (article 1, first paragraph).

By paragraph 2, foundlings recovered in Italy are citizens by birth if it cannot be proven that these persons are in possession of another citizenship. Article 3 partially restates the text contained in article 5 of law 123 of 1983 where it establishes that an adoptive child of an Italian citizen is Italian, even if the child is of foreign origin, and even if the child was born before the passing of the law. It has expressly established retroactivity in this situation.

This is notwithstanding the fact that the law otherwise precludes its own retroactive application in article 20, which provides that "...except as expressly provided, the citizenship status acquired prior to the present law is not altered, unless by events after its date of entry into force".

This provision, in concert with opinion number 105 of 15 April 1983, has provided that children of an Italian citizen mother and an alien father born before 1 January 1948 (date of the republican constitution's entry into force) remain subject to the old law 555 of 13 June 1912, despite the Constitutional Court's pronouncement of unconstitutionality in decision 30 of 1983.

Additionally, law 91 of 1992 allows the possession of multiple citizenships, previously prohibited in article 5 of law 123 of 1983 for those Italians acquiring a new citizenship. This allowance of keeping Italian citizenship is not applicable in all cases of an Italian acquiring foreign citizenship, because Italy has maintained treaties with some states to the effect that an Italian naturalising in one of those states could lose Italian citizenship automatically. Law 91 of 1992 leaves those agreements in effect. (article 26) Furthermore, law 91 of 1992 rules that persons who obtain Italian citizenship do not need to renounce to their earlier citizenship, provided the dual nationality is also permitted by the other concerned state.

Laws coming after 1992 have altered access to citizenship extending it to some categories of citizens who for historical reasons, in connection with war events, were still excluded.

These more recent laws follow:

1) Law no. 379 of 14 December 2000 "Provisions for the recognition of Italian citizenship for the persons born and resident in the territories belonging to the Austro-Hungarian Empire and their descendants". (Published in the Official Gazette no. 295 on 19 December 2000)

Law 379/2000 contained provisions to recognize Italian citizenship for those persons who were born and residing in Italy's annexed territories from the Austro-Hungarian Empire prior to 15 July 1920. The recognition was available also to their descendants. Recognition of Italian citizenship under law 379/2000 was given only to applicants, and the provisions expired in December 2010.

2) Law no. 124 of March 2006 "Changes to law number 91 of 5 February 1992 concerning the recognition of Italian citizenship for nationals of Istria, Fiume, and Dalmatia and their descendants". (Published in the Official Gazette no. 73 on 28 March 2006)

Law 124/2006 allows individuals who were Italian citizens residing in territories ceded from Italy to Yugoslavia at the time of their cession to reclaim Italian citizen status. It gives the ability to claim Italian citizen status to those people with knowledge of Italian language and culture who are lineal descendants of the eligible persons who were residing in those regions.

In more recent times, reforms to the citizenship law favouring immigrants from outside of the European Union were discussed. These immigrants currently may apply for citizenship after the completion of ten years of residency in the territory of the republic.

Many aspects remain unresolved, such as the recognition of citizenship status for descendants of an Italian woman who before 1948 had married a foreign husband and lost Italian citizenship on account of her marriage. These cases have created a dual system for recognition of citizenship: While the descendants by a paternal line have no impediments to the recognition of their citizenship status—even if the ascendant emigrated in 1860 (before Italy formed a state); the descendants of an Italian woman—even if she was from the same family—today still find themselves precluded from reacquiring Italian citizenship, and their only possible remedy is to appear before an Italian judge.

== Acquisition and loss of citizenship ==
=== Entitlement by birth or descent ===
Children born within Italy automatically receive Italian citizenship at birth if at least one parent is an Italian citizen. Individuals born in the country to non-Italian parents who do not acquire the citizenship of their parents and would otherwise be stateless automatically acquire Italian citizenship at birth. Children born overseas are Italian citizens if they are born to an Italian citizen and acquire no other nationality at birth, if at least one parent or grandparent only holds Italian citizenship and was born in Italy, or if at least one Italian parent is domiciled in Italy for two years before their child's birth. Individuals born in Italy to foreign parents and who have been continuously domiciled in the country since birth until age 18 are entitled to acquire Italian citizenship.

=== Naturalisation ===
Under Article 9 of Law 91/1992 (amended), adult foreigners may apply to naturalise as Italian citizens after residing in the country for a period of time:

- after 2 years continuous residency if a parent or grandparent were Italian citizens by birth
- after 3 years continuous residency if born in Italy
- after 4 years continuous residency for EU citizens
- after 5 years continuous residency after being adopted by an Italian citizen
- after 5 years continuous residency for stateless persons
- after 10 years continuous residency for non-EU citizens

The applicant must show evidence of Italian language skills of at least CEFR Level B1.

=== Former citizens of Vatican City ===
Under the terms of the Lateran Treaty, any person who loses Vatican citizenship and would otherwise become stateless automatically acquires Italian citizenship. Eligibility to Vatican citizenship is not tied to the territory of Vatican City, but by a person's appointment to an office associated with the Holy See. This includes Cardinals of the Catholic Church domiciled within the Vatican or in Rome, diplomats of the Holy See, and any other person who is resident in Vatican City because of their occupation. Spouses and children of a Vatican citizen who are authorised to reside in state territory may apply for a grant of citizenship, as well as any person who otherwise does not meet requirements for employment or family relations but is specifically authorised by the Pope to reside within the Vatican.

Any person who ceases employment in a qualifying office or is no longer domiciled in Vatican City automatically loses Vatican citizenship. Family members of a person whose qualifying employment ends also lose their Vatican citizenship at the same time. Upon reaching age 18, children of a Vatican citizen automatically cease to hold Vatician citizenship and must apply for continued residence permission at that time if desired. Cardinals who become domiciled outside of Vatican City or Rome also lose Vatican citizenship.

=== Automatic Acquisition of Italian Citizenship ===
- Willingness to obtain: a foreign or stateless minor, descended from at least a parent who is an Italian citizen by birth, becomes an Italian citizen if the parent or guardian declares the willingness to obtain Italian citizenship. It also requires that, subsequent to such declaration, the minor resides legally and continuously for at least two years in Italy, or that the declaration of will be made within one year of birth or of the date of recognition/adoption by an Italian citizen. This was imposed by Law No. 74 of May 23, 2025. This type of citizenship counts as "by benefit of law", so children of a parent who obtained Italian nationality by declaration will only be citizens from the date of the declaration and, therefore, will not be able to transmit Italian nationality through this route to their children.
- Minor Children of Citizens: Children without Italian citizenship, including those legally adopted under Italian law, can acquire citizenship if a parent holds Italian citizenship. This provision applies from 27 April 1983.
- Former Citizens: Former Italian citizens who previously renounced citizenship due to naturalization in another country can regain Italian citizenship after two years of residency in Italy. This provision was governed by the Citizenship Law 555 of 1912 until its replacement.

=== Citizenship through Marriage ===
- Pre-1983 Marriages: Foreign women who married Italian citizens before 27 April 1983 were automatically granted Italian citizenship.
- Residence and Language Requirements: Spouses of Italian citizens can apply for citizenship through naturalization after two years of legal residence in Italy. This residency requirement is halved if the couple has children. Since 4 December 2018, spouses are also required to demonstrate proficiency in the Italian language at a level of B1 or higher in the EU Common Language Framework.

== Attribution of citizenship through jus sanguinis ==
Inside cover of an Italian biometric passport issued in 2006

Citizens of other countries descended from a parent or grandparent born in Italy may have a claim to Italian citizenship by descent (or, in other words, by derivation according to jus sanguinis citizenship principles).

Italian citizenship is granted by birth through the paternal line, or through the maternal line for individuals born on or after 1 January 1948. An Italian citizen may be born in a country whose citizenship is acquired at birth by all persons born there. That person would be born therefore with the citizenship of two (or possibly more) countries. Delays in reporting the birth of an Italian citizen abroad do not cause that person to lose Italian citizenship, and such a report might in some cases be filed by the person's descendants many years after he or she is deceased. A descendant of a deceased Italian citizen whose birth in another country was not reported to Italy may report that birth, along with his or her own birth (and possibly the births of descendants in intermediate generations), to be acknowledged as having Italian citizenship.

A person may only have acquired jus sanguinis Italian citizenship by birth if one or both of that person's parents was in possession of Italian citizenship on the birth date. There is a possibility in the law that the only parent who held Italian citizenship on the birth date of a child born with jus sanguinis Italian citizenship was the mother, who previously acquired the Italian citizenship by marriage to the father, who relinquished his own Italian citizenship before the child was born.

Under certain conditions, a child born with Italian citizenship might later have lost Italian citizenship during his or her infancy. The event could prevent a claim of Italian citizenship by his or her descendants. If the Italian parents of a minor child naturalised in another country, the child may have remained holding Italian citizenship, or else may have lost the Italian citizenship. The children who were exempt from losing their Italian citizenship upon the foreign naturalisation of their parents were in many cases (dual) citizens of other countries where they were born, by operation of the jus soli citizenship laws in those countries.

One must apply through the Italian consulate that has jurisdiction over their place of residence. Each consulate has slightly different procedures, requirements, and waiting times. However, the legal criteria for jus sanguinis citizenship are the same.

Basic Criteria for Acquisition of Citizenship jus sanguinis

For applications submitted by March 28, 2025, 11:59 p.m. Rome time:

There were no Italian citizens prior to 17 March 1861, because Italy had not yet been a unified state. Thus the oldest Italian ancestor from whom Italian citizenship is proven to be derived in any jus sanguinis citizenship claim must have been still alive on or after that date.

- Any child born to an Italian citizen parent (including parents also having the right to Italian citizenship jus sanguinis) is ordinarily born an Italian citizen, with the following caveats:
  - Prior to the "Minor Cirocolare" (Circolare 43347) being issued in October 2024, The Italian parent must not have naturalised as a citizen of another country before both the child's birth date and the date 15 August 1992. Following the issuance of circolare 43347, the Italian Parent must not have naturalized before the child reached the age of majority (21 prior to 10 March 1975 and 18 after that) or prior to 15 August 1992.
  - If the child had an Italian mother and a foreign father, the child ordinarily must have been born on or after 1 January 1948. Court of Cassation decision 4466 of 2009 ruled that a child born to an Italian mother and a foreign father before 1 January 1948 can have jus sanguinis Italian citizenship at birth. Italian citizenship petitions that invoke this ruling must be processed in the Civil Court of Rome until such time that the ruling is ratified by legislation.
  - This also only applies if the application for recognition was filed prior to the issuance of Circolare 43347. If the Italian parent naturalised as a citizen of another country on or after 1 July 1912, and prior to 15 August 1992, then the child's Italian citizenship survived the parent's loss if the child was already born, and residing in a country whose citizenship he or she additionally held because of that country's jus soli nationality laws. Conversely, if the child was not born in a country whose citizenship was attributed to the child based on jus soli provisions in its nationality law, then the child could lose Italian citizenship by acquiring the citizenship of the naturalising parent. Italy generally does not attribute its citizenship based on jus soli, so an Italian child born in Italy could lose Italian citizenship if his father naturalised. Following the issuance of the aforementioned circolare, the child needed to reach the age of majority before their parent naturalized in order to retain citizenship rights.
  - If the child's Italian father naturalised as a citizen of another country prior to 1 July 1912, the child's Italian citizenship was not directly impacted by the father's loss if the child reached legal adulthood (age 21) by the time the father naturalised, or else if the child was residing in Italy when the father naturalised (1865 Civil Code: Book I, Title I, Article 11).
  - If a person reached Italy's legal age of adulthood while possessing Italian citizenship, then that person's holding of Italian citizenship ceased to be conditioned on the subsequent citizenship changes that might occur for that person's parents. So if the Italian parent naturalised as a citizen of another country, then the child's Italian citizenship could survive the parent's loss if he or she reached legal adulthood (age 21 prior to 10 March 1975; age 18 thereafter) prior to the parent's naturalisation.
  - Italian citizens naturalising in another country prior to 15 August 1992, while being of legal adult age, typically lost their Italian citizenship at that time.
  - Italy has been a participant in the Strasbourg convention on the reduction of cases of multiple citizenship. Children born outside of Italy with the citizenship of a member country may not have been able to hold Italian citizenship by birth because of this convention. The convention has also extended the era when Italians could lose citizenship by foreign naturalisation to dates later than 14 August 1992, if the naturalisation were in a participant country.

"If your Italian ancestor was born in the following regions, Veneto, Friuli-Venezia-Giulia, or Trentino Alto-Adige, in order to apply for the Italian citizenship, you must prove that the ancestor left Italy after July 16, 1920" cit. icapbridging2worlds.com

All conditions above must be met by every person in a direct lineage. There is no generational limit, except in respect to the date of 17 March 1861. Note that if an Italian ancestor naturalised as a citizen of another country independently from his or her parents, and prior to reaching legal Italian adulthood (age 21 prior to 10 March 1975, and age 18 otherwise), then often that ancestor retained Italian citizenship even after the naturalisation and could still pass citizenship on to children. Also, having one qualifying Italian parent—who except in certain situations could only have been the child's father if the birth occurred before 1 January 1948—is sufficient for deriving (inheriting) citizenship, even if the other Italian parent naturalised or otherwise became unable to pass on citizenship. Sometimes that qualifying parent is the foreign-born mother, because foreign women who married Italian men prior to 27 April 1983 automatically became Italian citizens and, in many cases, retained that citizenship even when their Italian husbands later naturalised.

For applications submitted from 29 March 2025:

With Law No. 74 of 23 May 2025 and Decree-Law No. 36 of 28 March 2025, the transmission of Italian citizenship to descendants of Italian emigrants is no longer unrestricted. It establishes that those born outside of Italy and who also hold another nationality will not be considered Italian citizens — even before the entry into force of this Decree Law — unless they meet at least one of the following conditions:

- Having been recognized as an Italian citizen, in compliance with applicable legislation, provided that the recognition is supported by an application submitted to the competent consular office or city hall no later than March 28, 2025, at 11:59 p.m., Rome time;
- Having been recognized as an Italian citizen, in compliance with applicable legislation, provided that the recognition is supported by a judicial application submitted no later than 28 March 2025, at 11:59 p.m., Rome time;
- Have at least one citizen parent (biological or adoptive) or one citizen grandparent holding exclusively Italian Citizenship (at the time of birth of the child, or at time of their death);
- Have at least one citizen parent (biological or adoptive) who has resided in Italy as an Italian citizen for at least two consecutive years prior to the birth or adoption of the applicant;

=== Practical effects ===
A significant portion of jus sanguinis applicants are Italian Brazilians, Italian Americans, Italian Argentines and Italian Uruguayans as those countries received a large number of Italian immigrants in the late 1800s and 1900s, with Brazil being home of the largest Italian community outside of Italy, followed by Argentina and the United States.

Many of these Italians who do receive an Italian passport then use it to live in Spain and had previously used it to live in the United Kingdom when it was still part of the European Union.

The landmark 1992 European Court of Justice case Micheletti v. Cantabria, a case of an Argentine Italian citizen by descent living in Spain whose Italian citizenship was challenged by Spain, established that EU member states were not permitted to distinguish between traditional citizens of a fellow EU state, like Italy, and persons who only had citizenship in another EU state through descent or jus sanguinis.

The long consular waiting lines, combined with the difficulty of locating all the required documents, the fees, and the lack of reason to obtain a second passport for many people, act as a practical limit on the numbers who will actually apply.

== Transmission of Italian citizenship along maternal lines ==
=== Decision no. 4466 of 2009 from the Court of Cassation (final court of appeals) ===
The United Sections, reversing its position in decision number 3331 of 2004, has established that, by effect of decisions 87 of 1975 and 30 of 1983, the right to Italian citizenship status should be recognised for the applicant who was born abroad to the son of an Italian woman married to an alien within the effective period of law 555 of 1912 who was in consequence of her marriage deprived of Italian citizenship.

Though partaking of the existing principle of unconstitutionality, according to which the pronouncement of unconstitutionality of the pre-constitutional rules produces effects only upon the relations and situations not yet concluded as of the date 1 January 1948, not being capable of retroacting earlier than the constitution's entry into force; the Court affirms that the right of citizenship, since it is a permanent and inviolable status except where it is renounced on the part of the petitioner, is justifiable at any time (even in the case of the prior death of the ascendant or parent of whoever derives the recognition) because of the enduring nature, even after the entry into force of the constitution, of an illegitimate privation due to the discriminatory rules pronounced unconstitutional.

==== Effects of decision no. 4466 of 2009 from the Court of Cassation on jurisprudence ====
After this 2009 decision, the judges in the Court of Rome (Tribunale di Roma) awarded, in more than 500 cases, Italian citizenship to the descendants of a female Italian citizen, born before 1948; and to the descendants of an Italian woman who had married a non-Italian citizen before 1948. As the Italian Parliament has not coded this decision from Cassation into law, it is not possible for these descendants to obtain jus sanguinis citizenship, making the pertinent application before a consulate or a competent office of vital and civil records in Italian municipalities. For these kind of descendants of Italian women the possibility of receiving recognition of Italian citizenship therefore only remains by making a case in the Italian Court.

== Dual citizenship ==
According to Italian law, multiple citizenship is explicitly permitted under certain conditions if acquired on or after 16 August 1992. (Prior to that date, Italian citizens with jus soli citizenship elsewhere could keep their dual citizenship perpetually, but Italian citizenship was generally lost if a new citizenship was acquired, and the possibility of its loss through a new citizenship acquisition was subject to some exceptions.) Those who acquired another citizenship after that date but before 23 January 2001 had three months to inform their local records office or the Italian consulate in their country of residence. Failure to do so carried a fine. Those who acquired another citizenship on or after 23 January 2001 could send an auto-declaration of acquisition of a foreign citizenship by post to the Italian consulate in their country of residence. On or after 31 March 2001, notification of any kind is no longer necessary.

== Citizenship fee ==
From 2025, all applications by people aged 18 or over asking for recognition of Italian citizenship are subject to a payment of a €600 fee. From 2014, the fee was €300. (Law n. 66, 24 April 2014 and Law n. 89, 23 June 2014). This was passed by the Renzi Cabinet led by Matteo Renzi.

== See also ==
- Naturalized athletes of Italy
- Visa policy of the Schengen Area
- Visa requirements for Italian citizens
