= ID number (Italy) =

Overview of identification numbers used in Italy

ID Numbers in Italy refers to the identification numbers used by public authorities in the Italian Republic. Unlike several countries that assign a single national identification number to every resident, Italy uses multiple identifiers for different administrative, fiscal, healthcare, and identification purposes. The most widely used is the codice fiscale, while official identity documents, such as the Italian electronic identity card (CIE), passports, and health cards, each bear their own document or serial numbers.

== Overview ==
Italy does not maintain a universal personal identification number applicable to all legal and administrative purposes. Instead, different identifiers are assigned according to the function of a document or public service.

The principal identification numbers include:

- Codice fiscale – an alphanumeric tax identification code issued by the Agenzia delle Entrate. It identifies individuals in dealings with public administrations, employers, banks, and many private organisations.
- Tessera Sanitaria number – the Italian health card contains the holder's codice fiscale together with its own card serial number and is used to access the National Health Service.
- Carta d'Identità Elettronica (CIE) number – every CIE carries a unique document number identifying the identity card itself. The card also contains additional identifiers, including the Numero Identificativo Servizi (NIS), used for certain digital services.
- Passport number – a serial number assigned to each Italian passport.
- Driving licence number – a unique number assigned to each Italian driving licence.
- TULPS identification numbers – licences and authorisations issued under the Testo unico delle leggi di pubblica sicurezza (TULPS) may bear administrative identification numbers. These identify the licence or authorisation rather than serving as a general personal identification number.
- Partita IVA (VAT identification number) – the Italian VAT identification number assigned by the Agenzia delle Entrate to persons and entities registered for VAT purposes. An Italian VAT number consists of 11 digits; for intra-European Union transactions it is generally written with the country prefix IT. The partita IVA identifies a taxable person or entity for VAT purposes and is distinct from the codice fiscale, although the two identifiers can be associated with the same person or entity.

Although the codice fiscale is often used as the principal identifier for individuals in dealings with Italian public administration, it is legally distinct from the document numbers assigned to identity cards, passports, and health cards.

== See also ==
- Italian fiscal code
- Italian electronic identity card
- Tessera sanitaria
- National identification number
