= Caci =

CACI may refer to:

- CACI International Inc, a multinational professional services and information technology company headquartered in Arlington, Virginia, United States.
- Central Asia Counternarcotics Initiative (CACI), an American proposed plan to tackle illegal drug trafficking in Central Asia.
- Compounding Aseptic Containment Isolator (CACI), an item used in a cleanroom to minimize airborne toxins from entering the laboratory environment.

Caci may refer to:

- Caci (fighting), a traditional martial art of the Manggarai people of Flores, Indonesia
- caci, plural of cacio, a pasta dish (see Cacio e pepe and Cacio figurato)
- Aleks Çaçi (1916–1989), Albanian writer
- Anthony Caci (born 1997), French footballer
- Jimmy Caci, (1925–2011), American crime family member
- ćaci, a Serbian political protest term, reference to the ćaci u školu incident
