= Central Asia Counternarcotics Initiative =

The Central Asia Counternarcotics Initiative (CACI) is an American proposed plan to tackle illegal drug trafficking in Central Asia. The plan was proposed during the Third Ministerial Conference of the Paris Pact Partners on Combating Illicit Traffic in Opiates Originating in Afghanistan, which took place in Vienna on 16 February 2012.

In the runup to the February 2012 meeting, Russia managed to dissuade its Central Asian partners from accepting the plan. Russian-based critics of the scheme have argued that it is an attempt by America to increase its influence in Central Asia.
