= Paris Pact Initiative =

The Paris Pact Initiative is an international partnership aimed at combating Afghan opiates trafficking, consumption and related problems in countries along the Afghan opiates trafficking routes. The Initiative dates back to a meeting titled the Ministerial Conference on Drug Routes from Central Asia to Europe that was held in Paris on 22 May 2003. The participants of the meeting adopted the so-called "Paris Statement", later followed by the Moscow Declaration and the Vienna Declaration.

The Initiative has developed in phases. As of spring 2015, it was in its Phase IV, set to last approximately from June 2013 - May 2016.

== Components ==
- periodical consultations at the expert and policy level between partners;
- an internet-based tool (the Automated Donor Assistance Mechanism ADAM) providing Paris Pact partners with information to coordinate counter narcotics technical assistance;
- a network of 10 National Strategic Analysts covering key partner countries such as Afghanistan, Iran, Pakistan, the Central Asian Republics of Kazakhstan, Kyrgyzstan, Tajikistan, Turkmenistan and Uzbekistan, the Russian Federation, Serbia and North Macedonia.

== The Rainbow Strategy ==
The Paris Pact's priorities were vaguely defined at first, but under the guidance of the UNODC over the years the participants of the Paris Pact Initiative adopted seven action outlines that in 2007 were collectively termed "the Rainbow Strategy". The strategy consists of:

- The Blue Paper: Afghanistan's Opium Poppy Free Road Map and Provincial Profiles;
- The Green Paper: Afghanistan, Iran and Pakistan: Border Management Cooperation and Drug Control;
- The Yellow Paper: Securing Central Asia's borders with Afghanistan;
- The Violet Paper: The Caspian Sea and Turkmen border initiatives;
- The Red Paper: Targeting precursors used in heroin manufacture: operation TARCET;
- The Orange Paper: Financial flows linked to Afghan opiates production and trafficking;
- The Indigo Paper: Preventing and Treating Opiates Addiction and HIV/AIDS epidemics in Afghanistan and neighboring countries.

== International Partner Organizations ==
- Common Foreign and Security Policy (CFSP)
- Council of Europe (CE)
- Economic Cooperation Organization (ECO)
- European Commission (EC)
- European Monitoring Centre for Drugs and Drug Addiction (EMCDDA)
- European Police Office (EUROPOL)
- Financial Action Task Force (FATF)
- International Criminal Police Organization (INTERPOL)
- Organization for Security and Cooperation in Europe (OSCE)
- United Nations Interim Administration Mission in Kosovo (UNMIK)
- United Nations Office on Drugs and Crime (UNODC)
- United Nations Programme on HIV/AIDS (UNAIDS)
- World Customs Organization (WCO)
- World Health Organization (WHO)
