= Italian health insurance card =

Italian Health Insurance Documentation

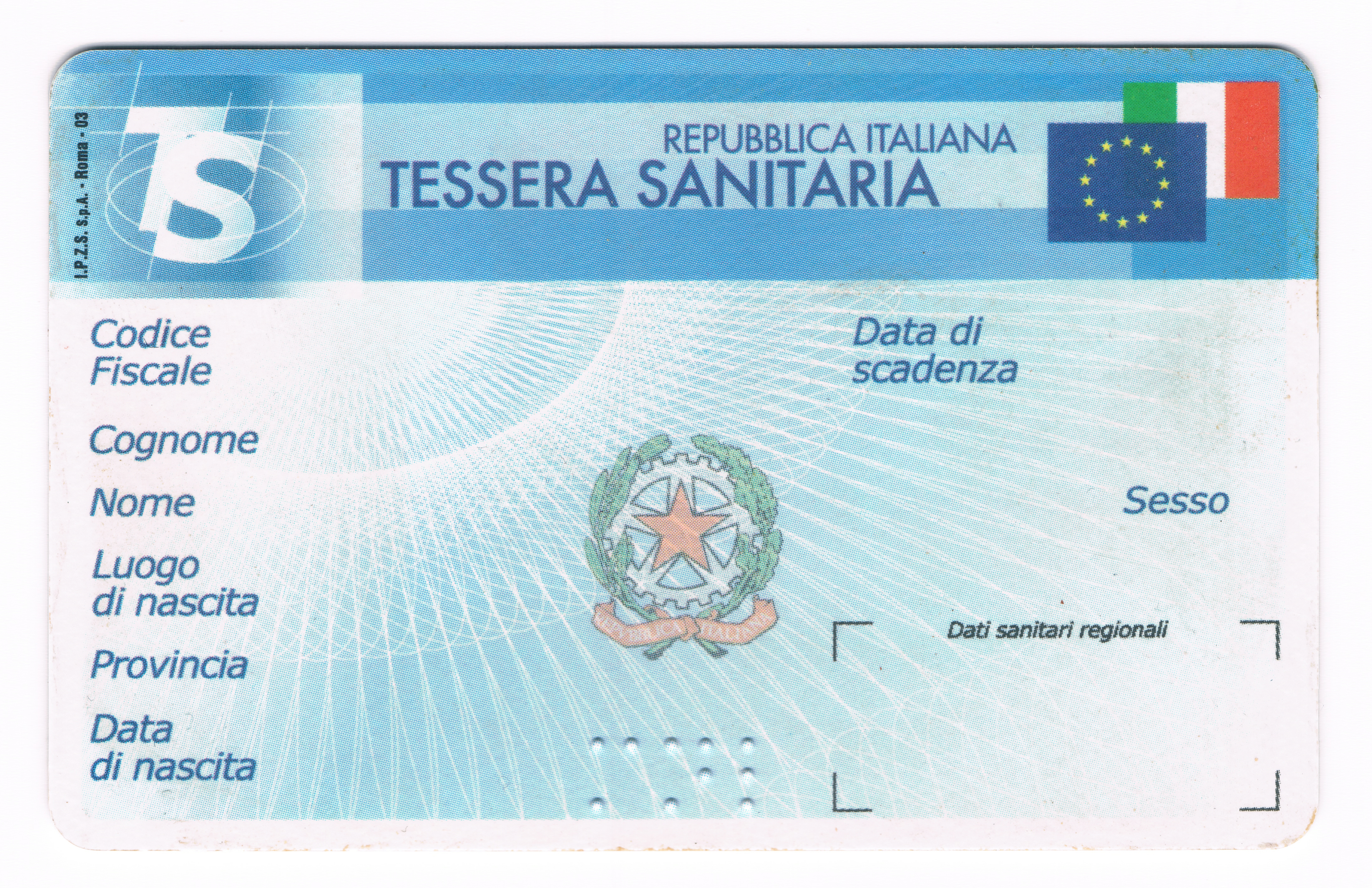
An earlier Italian health insurance card

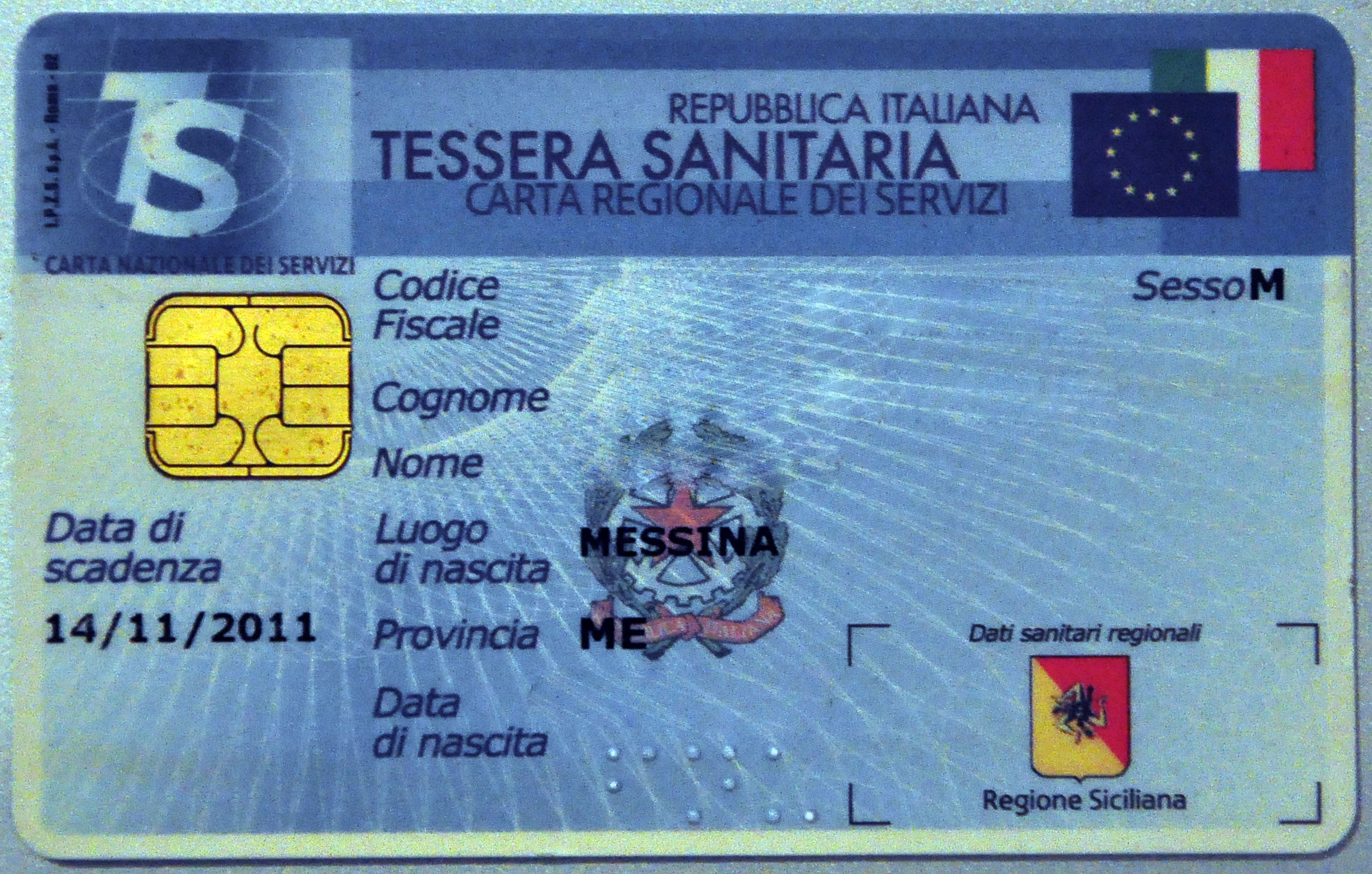
A health insurance card issued in Sicily as a smart card

The Italian health insurance card (Italian: Tessera sanitaria) is a personal card for all citizens entitled to benefits of the Italian National Health Service. Its rear side acts as a European Health Insurance Card. The objective of the health insurance card is to improve social security services through expenditure control and performance, and to optimize the use of health services by citizens.

== History ==
The insurance card was issued for Italian citizens by the Italian Ministry of Economy and Finance in cooperation with the Italian Agency of Revenue in accordance with Article 50 of dl 269/2003, converted, with amendments, by law 326/2003. It replaced the Italian fiscal code card system.

== Features ==
The health insurance card features the following:

- contains biographical data and welfare information
- contains the tax code on magnetic band format as well as barcode
- valid throughout Italy
- almost always grants the holder the right to obtain health services throughout the European Union (there are some exceptions to this)
- replaces the E111
- replaces the Italian fiscal code card
- valid for six years
- in the most recent version, with integrated circuit included, offers added functions as a smart card, able to access online service provided by public administrations. This version is called Tessera Sanitaria-Carta Nazionale dei Servizi (TS-CNS), or Tessera Sanitaria-Carta Regionale dei Servizi (TS-CRS), the latter in the Autonomous regions with special statute.

The material consists of a plastic card with identical size and consistency to a typical ATM card. The cards are printed on the front with the tax code, expiration date, biographical data, and the distinctive coat of arms of the Italian region of residence. The front of the card also includes Braille characters for the blind and an integrated circuit. On the back of the card are located the tax code barcodes, the magnetic strip, and the words "Tessera europea di assicurazione malattia", meaning "European health insurance card".

== Pharmaceutical expenses ==
From 1 January 2008 legislation came into force imposing an obligation to issue the "scontrino fiscale parlante" for the certification of medicines to be used for deducting expenses. The receipt shows the amount and type of drugs purchased, in addition to the tax code reviews. It is necessary to supply the health insurance card or Italian fiscal code card when purchasing medicine.

== Exceptions ==
Prior to the end of September 2013, the people in Lombardy might have been in possession of a document, called the (CRS-SISS), which had, in addition to a magnetic stripe, a smart chip to facilitate making payments in the form of a cash card (subject to an individual's request for activation). The CRS-SISS differed aesthetically from the national health insurance cards in regards to colors (shades of yellow / orange), to the use of different graphics, different arrangement of text, and in regards to the absence of the three characters in Braille to 6 points for the blind. Through special card reader, people could use the CRS-SISS to access online services provided by government. The CRS-SISS has been gradually replaced by the smart card version of the national health insurance card.
