= History of cannabis =

The Chinese character for hemp (麻 or má) depicts two plants under a shelter. Notably, the same character also means "numb". Cannabis cultivation dates back at least 3000 years in Taiwan.

The history of cannabis refers to the history of the genus Cannabis and of its dry herbal tops also called "cannabis."

The cultivation of the plant and usage of its dry tops by humans dates back to at least the third millennium BC in written history, and possibly as far back as the Pre-Pottery Neolithic B (8800–6500 BCE) based on archaeological evidence. For millennia, the plant has been valued for its use for fiber and rope, as food and medicine, and for its psychoactive properties for religious and recreational use.

The earliest restrictions on cannabis were reported in the Islamic world by the 14th century. In the 19th century, it began to be restricted in colonial countries, often associated with racial and class stresses. In the middle of the 20th century, international coordination led to sweeping restrictions on cannabis throughout most of the globe. Entering the 21st century, some nations began to take measures to decriminalize or legalize cannabis.

== Ancient uses ==
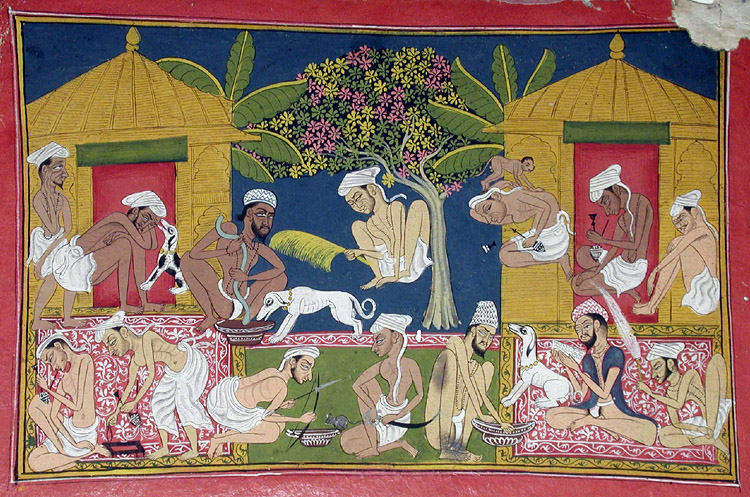
Bhang eaters from India c. 1790. Bhang is an edible preparation of cannabis native to the Indian subcontinent. It has been used in food and drink as early as 1000 BC by Hindus in ancient India.

Hemp is one of the earliest plants to be cultivated. In 2019, archeologists from the Chinese Academy of Sciences found the oldest evidence of smoked cannabis from roughly 2,500 years ago in a cemetery in present-day western China's Taxkorgan County, in the Pamir Mountains. Cannabis has been cultivated in Japan since the pre-Neolithic period for its fibres and as a food source and possibly as a psychoactive material. An archeological site in the Oki Islands near Japan contained cannabis achenes from about 8000 BC, probably signifying use of the plant. Hemp use archaeologically dates back to the Neolithic Age in China, with hemp fiber imprints found on Yangshao culture pottery dating from the 5th millennium BC. The Chinese later used hemp to make clothes, shoes, ropes, and an early form of paper.

Cannabis was an important crop in ancient Korea, with samples of hempen fabric discovered dating back as early as 3000 BC.

Fourteen percent of Hindu holy men surveyed, and especially those from the Naga sect, believe cannabis to have been used by the Hindu God Shiva. It has been part of Hindu practice and culture.

Cannabis was cultivated near cities in South Asia as early as 500 BC even if textual sources only seem to suggest cannabis presence from the 11th to 14th centuries.

Hemp is called ganja (Sanskrit: गञ्जा, IAST: gañjā) in Sanskrit and other modern Indo-Aryan languages. Some scholars suggest that the ancient drug soma, mentioned in the Vedas, was cannabis, although this theory is disputed. Bhanga is mentioned in several Indian texts dated before 1000 AD. However, there is philological debate among Sanskrit scholars as to whether this bhanga can be identified with modern bhang or cannabis. Some believe the first references to cannabis in South Asia date to the eleventh century AD.

Cannabis was also known to the ancient Assyrians, who potentially utilized it as an aromatic. They called it qunabu and qunubu (which could signify "a way to produce smoke"), a potential origin of the modern word "cannabis". Cannabis was introduced as well to the Scythians, Thracians and Dacians, whose shamans (the kapnobatai—"those who walk on smoke/clouds") burned cannabis flowers to induce trance. The classical Greek historian Herodotus (ca. 480 BC) reported that the inhabitants of Scythia would often inhale the vapors of hemp-seed smoke, both as ritual and for their own pleasurable recreation. Evidence of this report has been found in a 2,800-years-old Scythian burial mound at Tunnug 1, Republic of Tyva, Russia.

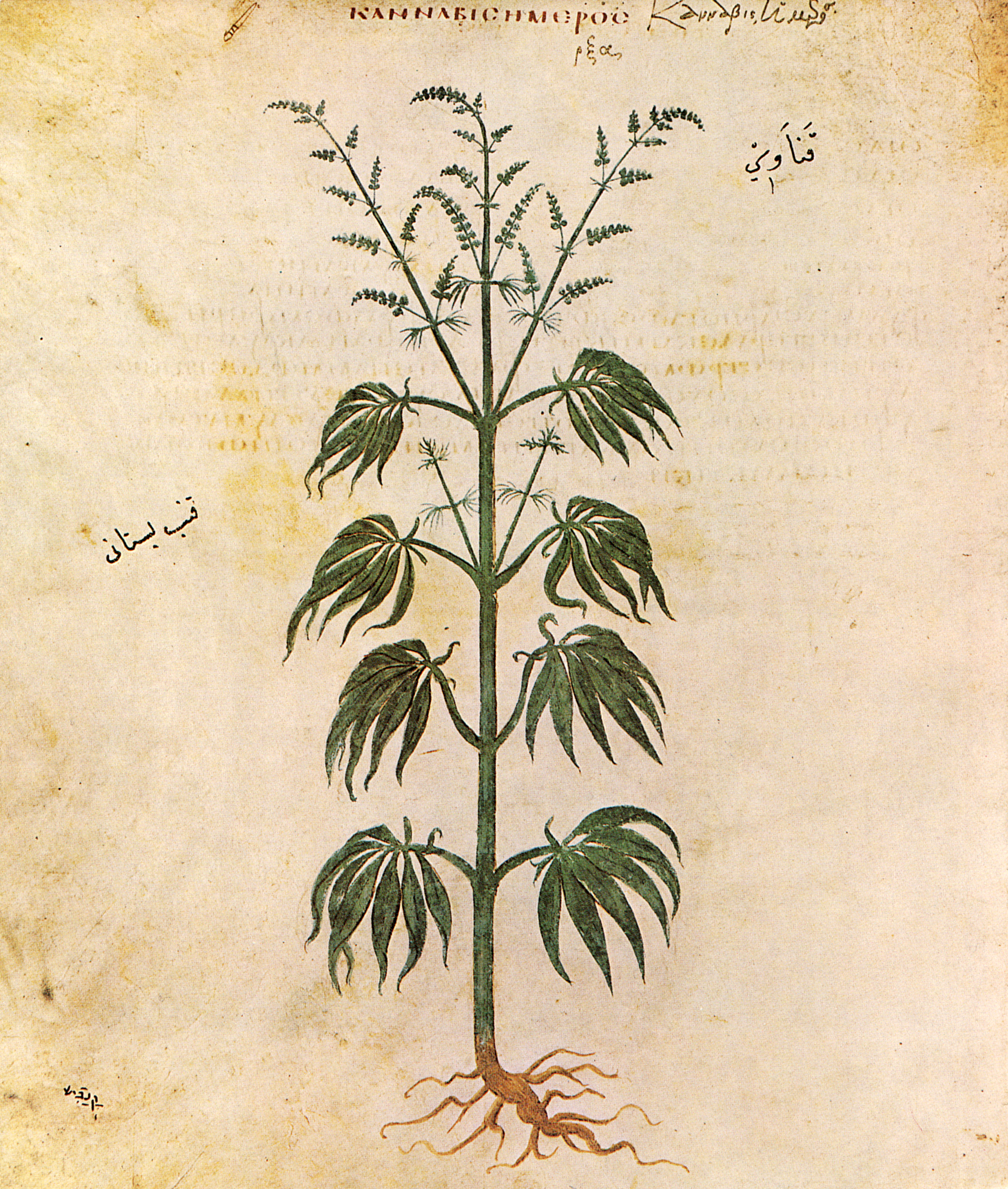
Cannabis sativa from Vienna Dioscurides, AD 512

Cannabis residues have been found on two altars in Tel Arad, dated to the Kingdom of Judah in the 8th century BC. Its discoverers believe that the evidence points to the use of cannabis for ritualistic psychoactive use in Judah. According to Zohar Amar the fact that the Tel Arad altar was eventually closed down (apparently due to religious opposition by Hezekiah), and the Biblical prohibition on priestly service while intoxicated by wine (Leviticus 10:8–11), indicate that Israelite religion in general was probably opposed to cannabis use as part of its priestly services.

Cannabis has an ancient history of ritual use and is found in pharmacological cults around the world. Hemp seeds discovered by archaeologists at Pazyryk suggest early ceremonial practices like eating by the Scythians occurred during the 5th to 2nd century BC confirming previous historical reports by Herodotus. In China, the psychoactive uses of cannabis is described in the Shennong Bencaojing, written around the 3rd century AD. Daoists mixed cannabis with other ingredients, then placed them in incense burners and inhaled the smoke.

== Global spread ==
Around the turn of the second millennium, the use of hashish (cannabis resin) began to spill over from the Persian world into the Arab world. Cannabis was allegedly introduced to Iraq in 1230 AD, during the reign of Caliph Al-Mustansir Bi'llah, by the entourage of Bahraini rulers visiting Iraq. Hashish was introduced to Egypt by "mystic Islamic travelers" from Syria sometime during the Ayyubid dynasty in the 12th century AD. Hashish consumption by Egyptian Sufis has been documented as occurring in the thirteenth century AD, and a unique type of cannabis referred to as Indian hemp was also documented during this time. Smoking did not become common in the Old World until after the introduction of tobacco, so up until the 1500s hashish in the Muslim world was consumed as an edible.

Cannabis is thought to have been introduced to Africa by Indian Hindu travelers, which Bantu settlers subsequently introduced to southern Africa when they migrated southward. Smoking pipes uncovered in Ethiopia and carbon-dated to around 1320 AD were found to have traces of cannabis. It was already in popular use in South Africa by the indigenous Khoisan and Bantu peoples prior to European settlement in the Cape in 1652. By the 1850s, Swahili traders had carried cannabis from the east coast of Africa, to the Congo Basin in the west.

King Henry VIII of England strongly encouraged hemp cultivation in the early sixteenth century, particularly for its use by the expanding English navy.

In the Western Hemisphere, early Spanish Florida explorer Álvar Núñez Cabeza de Vaca, describing the many tribes of native peoples he encountered between 1527 and 1537, wrote "Throughout the country they get inebriated [also translated as 'become drunk' and 'produce stupefaction'] by using a certain smoke, and will give everything they have in order to get it." The Spaniards brought cannabis (often considered to be industrial hemp although Spain's hemp was psychoactive) to the Western Hemisphere and cultivated it in Chile starting about 1545. In 1607, "hempe" was among the crops Gabriel Archer observed being cultivated by the natives at the main Powhatan village, where Richmond, Virginia is now situated; and in 1613, Samuell Argall reported wild hemp "better than that in England" growing along the shores of the upper Potomac. As early as 1619, the first Virginia House of Burgesses passed an Act requiring all planters in Virginia to sow "both English and Indian" hemp on their plantations.

During Napoléon Bonaparte's invasion of Egypt in 1798, alcohol was not available per Egypt being an Islamic country. In lieu of alcohol, Bonaparte's troops resorted to trying hashish, which they found to their liking. Following an 1836–1840 journey throughout North Africa and the Middle East, French physician Jacques-Joseph Moreau wrote on the psychological effects of cannabis use; Moreau was a member of Paris' Club des Hashischins (founded in 1844). In 1842, Irish physician William Brooke O'Shaughnessy, who had studied the drug while working as a medical officer in Bengal with the East India company, brought a quantity of cannabis with him on his return to Britain, provoking renewed interest in the West. Examples of classic literature of the period featuring cannabis include Les paradis artificiels (1860) by Charles Baudelaire and The Hasheesh Eater (1857) by Fitz Hugh Ludlow.

== Early restrictions ==
Jurisdictions around the world banned cannabis at various times since the Middle Ages. Perhaps the earliest was Soudoun Sheikouni, the emir of the Joneima in Arabia who prohibited its usage in the 1300s. In 1787, King Andrianampoinimerina of Madagascar took the throne, and soon after banned cannabis throughout the Merina Kingdom, implementing capital punishment as the penalty for its use.

As European colonial powers absorbed or came into contact with cannabis-consuming regions, the cannabis habit began to spread to new areas under the colonial umbrella, causing some alarm among authorities. Following his invasion of Egypt and Syria (1798–1801), Napoleon banned cannabis use among his soldiers. Cannabis was introduced to Brazil either by the Portuguese colonists or by African slaves in the early 1800s. Their intent may have been to cultivate hemp fiber, but the slaves the Portuguese imported from Africa were familiar with cannabis and used it psychoactively, leading the Municipal Council of Rio de Janeiro in 1830 to prohibit bringing cannabis into the city, and punishing its use by any slave. Similarly, the British practice of transporting Indian indentured workers throughout their empire resulted in the spreading of cannabis use. Concerns about use of gandia by laborers led to a ban in British Mauritius in 1840, and use of ganja by Indian laborers in British Singapore led to its banning there in 1870. In 1870, Natal (now in South Africa) passed the Coolie Law Consolidation prohibiting "the smoking, use, or possession by and the sale, barter, or gift to, any Coolies [Indian indentured workers] whatsoever, of any portion of the hemp plant (Cannabis sativa)..."

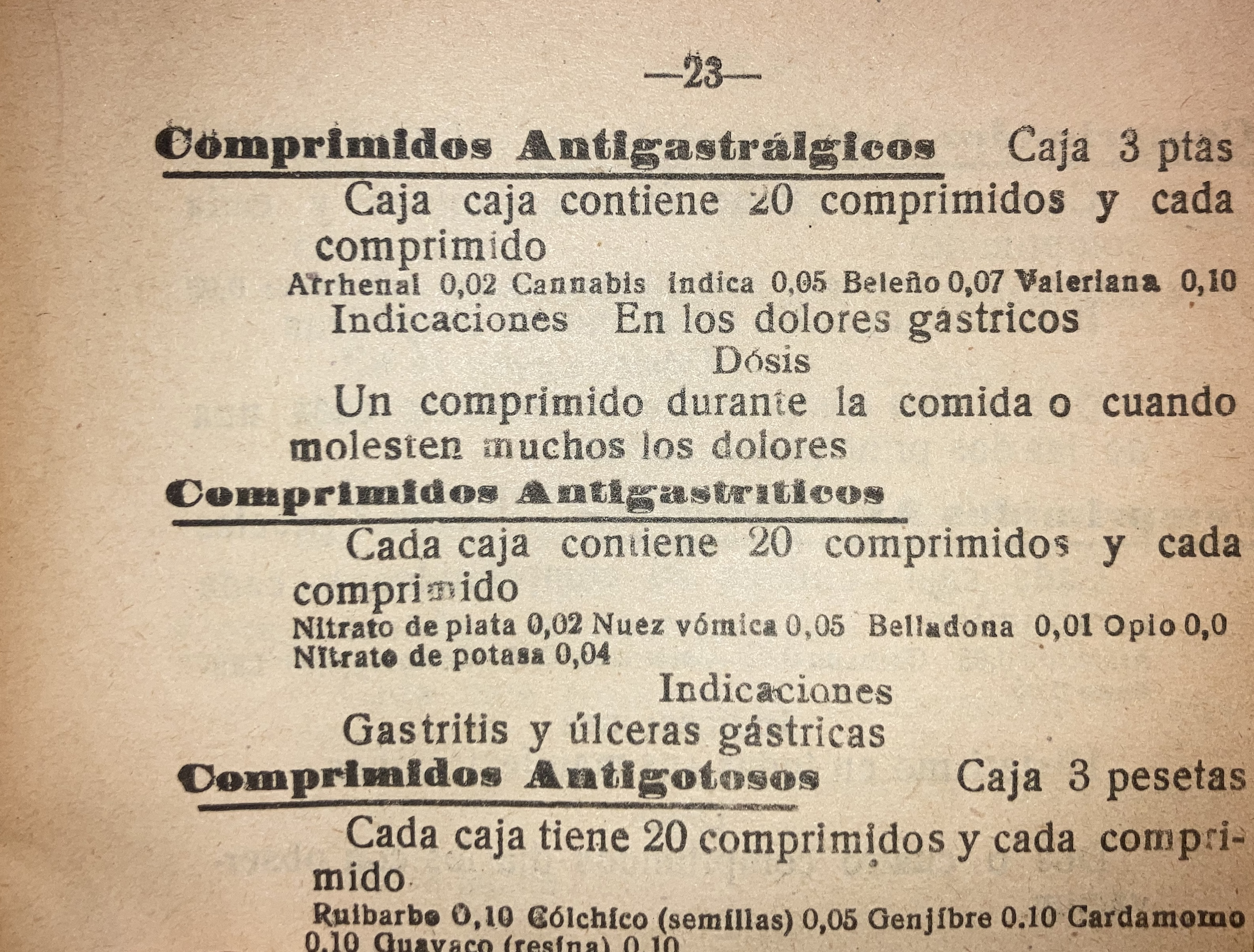
Spanish medicines containing cannabis (1920s)

Attempts at criminalising cannabis in British India were made, and mooted, in 1838, 1871, and 1877. In 1894, the British Indian government completed a wide-ranging study of cannabis in India. The report's findings stated:

Viewing the subject generally, it may be added that the moderate use of these drugs is the rule, and that the excessive use is comparatively exceptional. The moderate use practically produces no ill effects. In all but the most exceptional cases, the injury from habitual moderate use is not appreciable. The excessive use may certainly be accepted as very injurious, though it must be admitted that in many excessive consumers the injury is not clearly marked. The injury done by the excessive use is, however, confined almost exclusively to the consumer himself; the effect on society is rarely appreciable. It has been the most striking feature in this inquiry to find how little the effects of hemp drugs have obtruded themselves on observation.

— Report of the Indian Hemp Drugs Commission, 1894-1895

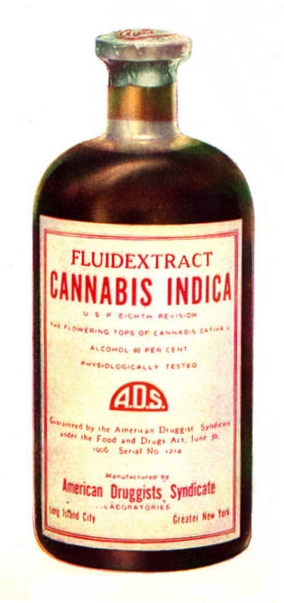
Cannabis indica fluid extract, American Druggists Syndicate, pre-1937

In the late 1800s, several countries in the Islamic world and its periphery banned cannabis, with the Khedivate of Egypt banning the importation of cannabis in 1879, Morocco strictly regulating cannabis cultivation and trade (while allowing several Rif tribes to continue production) in 1890, and the Kingdom of Greece banning hashish in 1890.

At the start of the 20th century, many more countries proceeded to ban cannabis. In the United States, the first restrictions on the sale of cannabis came in 1906 (in the District of Columbia). It was outlawed by the Ganja Law in Jamaica (then a British colony) in 1913, in South Africa in 1922, and in the United Kingdom and New Zealand in the 1920s. Canada criminalized cannabis in The Opium and Narcotic Drug Act, 1923, before any reports of the use of the drug in Canada.

In the United States in 1937, the Marihuana Tax Act was passed, and prohibited the production of hemp in addition to cannabis. The reasons that hemp was also included in this law are disputed—several scholars have claimed that the act was passed in order to destroy the US hemp industry. Shortly thereafter, the United States was forced back to promoting rather than discouraging hemp cultivation; hemp was used extensively by the United States during World War II to make uniforms, canvas, and rope. Much of the hemp used was cultivated in Kentucky and the Midwest. During World War II, the U.S. produced a short 1942 film, Hemp for Victory, promoting hemp as a necessary crop to win the war. In Western Europe, while the cultivation of hemp was still legal in the 1930s, commercial cultivation had stopped due to decreased demand; hemp could not compete with increasingly popular artificial fibers. In the early 1940s, world production of hemp fiber ranged from 250,000 to 350,000 metric tonnes, with Russia being the leading producer.

== International regulation ==
In 1925, an agreement was struck at an international conference in Geneva. Termed the Second International Opium Convention, the regulatory treaty banned exportation of "Indian hemp" to countries that had prohibited its use, while requiring importing countries to issue certificates affirming that cannabis shipments were "exclusively for medical or scientific purposes". It also required parties to "exercise an effective control of such a nature as to prevent the illicit international traffic in Indian hemp and especially in the resin." However, these controls applied only to pure extract and tincture, not to derivatives and medicinal preparations. In 1935, after complaints from Egypt about cannabis-containing medicines sold by Parke-Davis, the health branch of the League of Nations (International Office of Public Hygiene) granted countries the right to submit medicinal products containing cannabis to similar controls as those of pure extracts and tinctures under the 1925 Opium Convention.

In 1925, in parallel, cannabis herb, extract, and tincture appeared in the Second Brussels Agreement for the harmonization of pharmacopeias, a treaty precursor to the International Pharmacopoeia.

Shortly after World War II, a World Health Organization (WHO) committee withdrew cannabis and other herbal medicines from the international pharmacopoeia. Between 1952 and 1960, another WHO committee produced numerous negative conclusions regarding the therapeutic utility of cannabis. Coupled with a strong political determination from a number of countries, these events laid the groundwork for the placement of "cannabis and cannabis resin" on Schedule IV of the quasi-universally ratified 1961 Convention on narcotic drugs, with Schedule IV being the most restrictive level of international mandatory control.

== Liberalizing and legalizing ==
In 1972, the Dutch government divided drugs into more- and less-dangerous categories, with cannabis being in the lesser category. Accordingly, possession of 30 grams or more was made a misdemeanor. Cannabis has been available for recreational use in coffee shops since 1976. Cannabis products are sold openly in certain local "coffeeshops" and possession of up to 5 grams for personal use is decriminalised. However, the police may still confiscate the substance, which often happens in car checks near the border. Other types of sale and transportation are not permitted, although the general approach toward cannabis remains lenient, mirroring cultural norms prior to official decriminalisation.

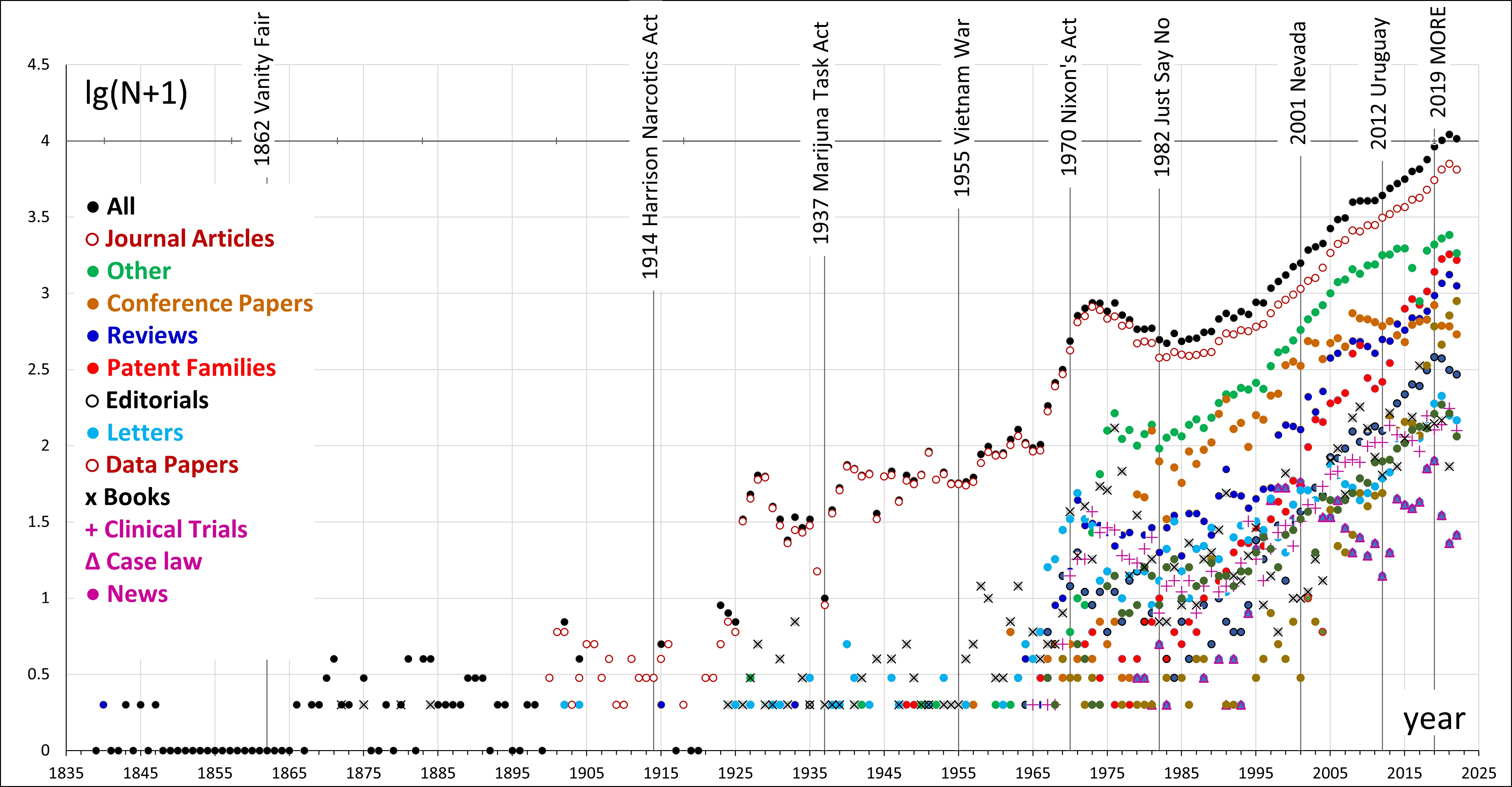
The number of publications about marijuana/cannabis according to Web of Science

Cannabis began to attract renewed interest as medicine in the 1970s and 1980s, in particular due to its use by cancer and AIDS patients who reported relief from the effects of chemotherapy and wasting syndrome. In 1996, California became the first U.S. state to legalize medical cannabis in defiance of federal law. In 2001, Canada became the first country to adopt a system regulating the medical use of cannabis.

In 2001, Portugal decriminalized all drugs, maintaining the prohibition on production and sale, but changing personal possession and use from a criminal offense to an administrative one. Subsequently, a number of European and Latin American countries decriminalized cannabis, such as Belgium (2003), Chile (2005), Brazil (2006), and the Czech Republic (2010).

In Uruguay, President Jose Mujica signed legislation to legalize recreational cannabis in December 2013, making Uruguay the first country in the modern era to legalize the substance. In August 2014, Uruguay legalized growing up to six plants at home, as well as the formation of growing clubs, and a state-controlled marijuana dispensary regime. In Canada, following the election of Justin Trudeau and the formation of a Liberal government, the House of Commons passed a bill legalizing cannabis on 17 October 2018.

Some U.S. states have legalized marijuana.

According to the United Nations' World Drug Report, cannabis "was the world's most widely produced, trafficked, and consumed drug in the world in 2010", with between 128 million and 238 million estimated users in 2015.

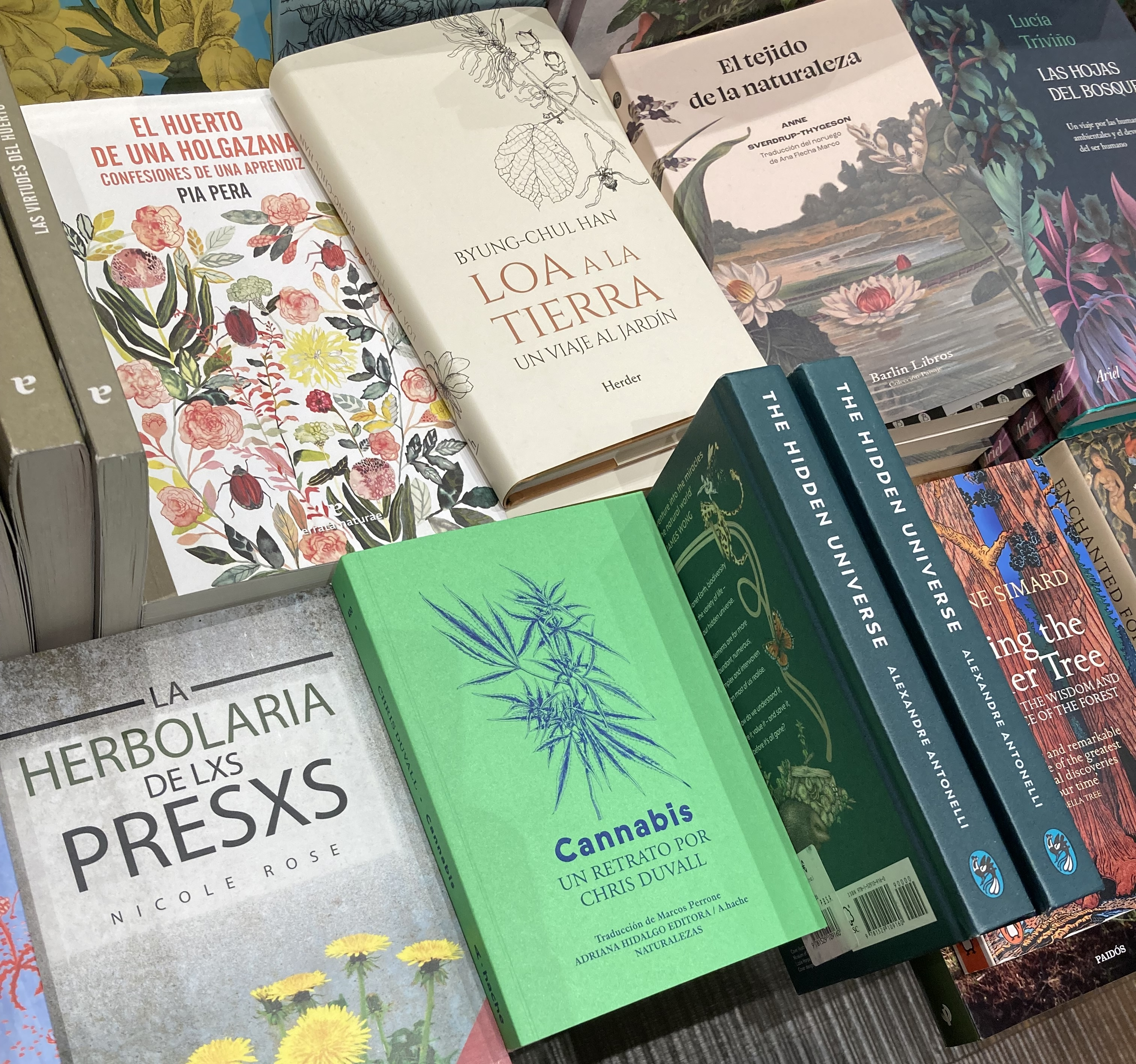
Books about Cannabis in Barcelona, Spain

Between 2018 and 2019, the WHO undertook its first scientific evidence-based assessment of cannabis, recommending the removal of cannabis and cannabis resin from Schedule IV of the Single Convention. A United Nations commission voted in December 2020 to approve the change in treaty scheduling.

In 2024, Germany partially legalized marijuana for recreational use, allowing individuals to grow up to three plants at home and introducing growing clubs under a non-commercial license.

== See also ==
- History of cannabis in Italy
- History of medical cannabis
- Timeline of cannabis law
