= Centenary of Cannabis prohibition =

Cannabis policy commemorations in 2025

Centenary of Cannabis Prohibition
- Part of the History of cannabis
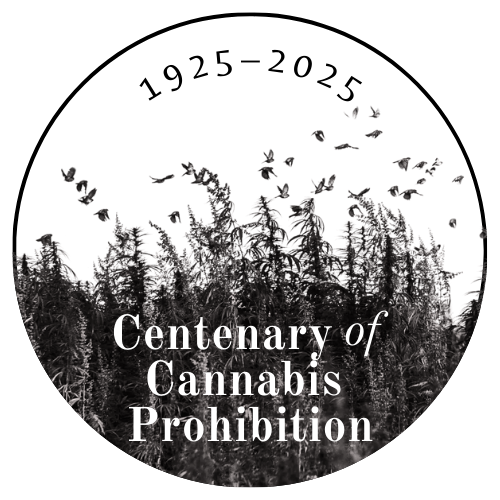

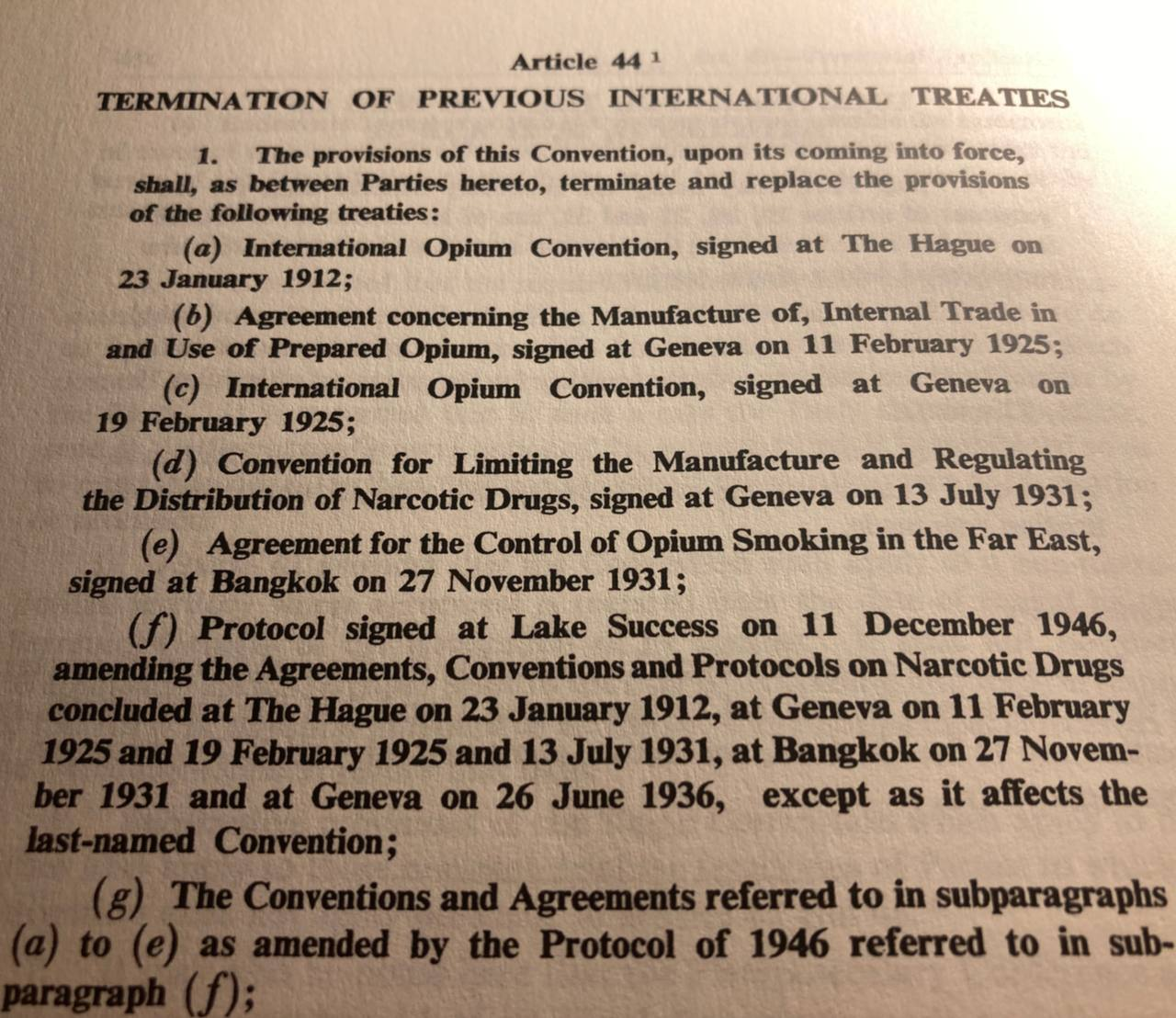
- Mention of the 1925 International Opium Convention's discontinuation and replacement by the 1961 Single Convention on narcotic drugs
- Date: 1 January – 31 December 2025
- Duration: 1 year
- Location: Various
- Also known as: Global Cannabis History Year
- Website: 2025.cannabisembassy.org

The Centenary of Cannabis Prohibition occurred in the year 2025 with events organised by cannabis activists in several countries, also noted in some academic publications. It marked the hundred years since the first international drug control measures were applied to "Indian hemp" (Cannabis sativa) in the 1925 International Opium Convention; it also represents a hundred years of the inclusion of medical cannabis in the 1925 International Pharmacopoeia Agreement.

== Background ==
The earliest treaties applying to cannabis were bilateral treaties related to trade in industrial hemp products, or other indirect topics like intellectual property. The first two direct references to cannabis in international treaties occurred in 1925:

- the Second Pharmacopoea Convention (Brussels Agreement)
- the Second Opium Convention (Geneva).

This addition was not an initiative of the United States but rather the result of "a triangulation between various State interests and blocs" (Egypt, South Africa, and Italy). On its website, the group "Cannabis Embassy" explains the following:

The modern prohibition of Cannabis sativa L. plant […] originated before 1925 in Brazil, Egypt, and South Africa. The USA came much, much later. But it was only in 1925 that Cannabis acquired a marked world character that continues to this day.

While the Brussels Pharmacopoeia treaty became the International Pharmacopoeia without cannabis, the Geneva Opium treaty was replaced with the Single Convention on Narcotic Drugs in 1961, with more-severe measures than in 1925. The 1925 Opium Treaty also signified the birth of the International Narcotics Control Board, which continues to control cannabis policy today.

From 1961 to 2020, cannabis and haschich were listed in Schedule IV, the most restrictive category of the 1961 Single Convention on Narcotic Drugs, the main treaty establishing legal dispositions on cannabis in international law. It was removed in 2020 after a scientific assessment by the World Health Organization and a narrow vote at the United Nations drugs commission.

During the second half of the 20th century, a number of treaties were adopted with some disposition affecting directly or indirectly the plant genus Cannabis and/or cannabis products. This is the case in particular for international human rights law, treaties on plant breeders' rights, farmers' rights, or biological diversity, or aspects such as international trade or intellectual property law.

== Commemorative events ==
In Toronto, Canada, the four-day exhibition Reclaiming Our Narratives in February 2025 explored the "history of cannabis in Black communities from pre-colonial times to today" in the framework of the Centenary. In Paris, the activists of NORML France themed the 2025 marijuana march around the Centenary commemoration. The Centenary was otherwise discussed in cannabis specialised press in Australia, Czechia, Ghana, Spain, and Sweden.

During the 2025 session of the United Nations Commission on Narcotic Drugs, the European group ENCOD organised a conference on the centenary. The South African NGO Fields of Green for All set up a cannabis information booth and an exhibition in the lobby of the United Nations Office on Drugs and Crime headquarters, and shared a written statement.

The "Cannabis Embassy" announced intentions to share a statement and organise events during the UNESCO's 2025 World Conference on Cultural Policies and Sustainable Development.

The centenary is also noted in the academic field, with an article in Nature deploring for instance that "a century of prohibition has severely restricted development of breeding and germplasm resources, leaving potential hemp-based nutritional and fibre applications unrealized."

== See also ==
- Cannabis and international law
- Timeline of cannabis law
- Legality of cannabis
- Medical cannabis, Cannabis (drug), and Hemp
- 1925 International Opium Convention (Geneva)
- 1925 Brussels Pharmacopoeia Agreement (Brussels)
