= Cannabis and international law =

The status of Cannabis in international law refers to the series of dispositions in international law affecting States' sovereignty in relation to the Cannabis plant genus, to a variety of "cannabis products" derived from the plant, or to their synthetic analogs.

== History ==
The earliest treaties applying to cannabis were bilateral treaties related to trade in industrial hemp products. In the 19th century, early intellectual property treaties applied to cannabis such as the 1883 Paris Convention for the Protection of Industrial Property or the 1891 Madrid Agreement Concerning the International Registration of Marks. They are still in force today, although they have been supplemented by other international legal instruments.

The first two direct references to cannabis in international treaties occurred in 1925, commemorated in 2025 with the Centenary of Cannabis prohibition:

- the Second Pharmacopoea Convention (Brussels Agreement)
- the Second Opium Convention (Geneva).

This addition was not an initiative of the United States but rather the result of "a triangulation between various State interests and blocs" (Egypt, South Africa, and Italy). From 1961 to 2020, cannabis and haschich were listed in Schedule IV, the most restrictive category of the 1961 Single Convention on Narcotic Drugs, the main treaty establishing legal dispositions on cannabis in international law. It was removed in 2020 after a scientific assessment by the World Health Organization and a narrow vote at the United Nations drugs commission.

During the second half of the 20th century, a number of treaties were adopted with some disposition affecting directly or indirectly the plant genus Cannabis and/or cannabis products. This is the case in particular for international human rights law, treaties on plant breeders' rights, farmers' rights, or biological diversity, or aspects such as international trade or intellectual property law.

== International drug control law ==
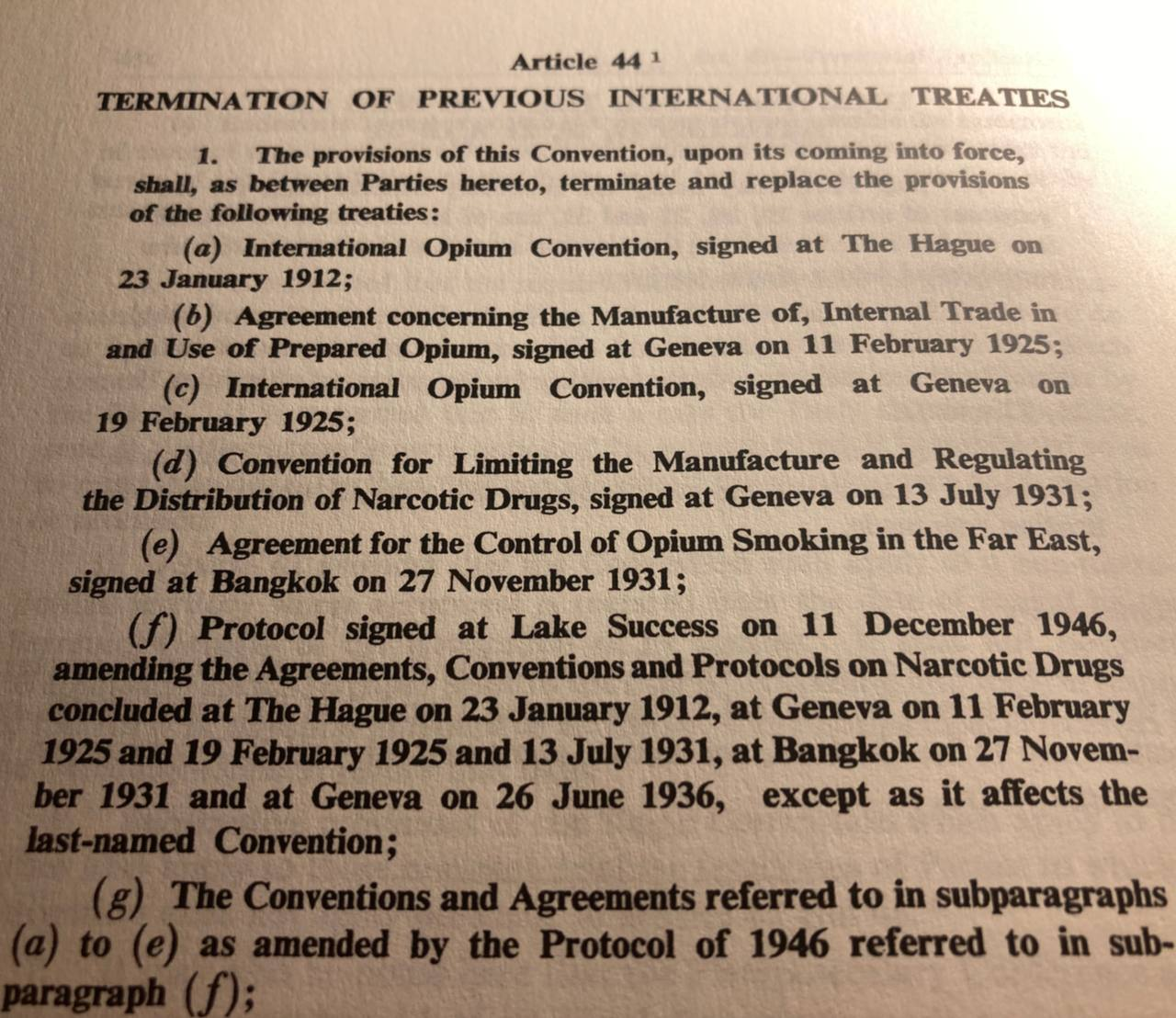
Former treaties that the 1961 Single Convention terminated and replaced

=== History ===
The first international treaty related to drugs concerned alcohol, and did not include cannabis. In following years, other treaties were adopted on opium and cocaine. It is in one of these that the first mention of "Indian hemp" appeared, although it did not imply any obligations for States.

The first international treaty incorporating cannabis in mandatory international drug control was the International Convention relating to Dangerous Drugs (also known as Second Geneva Opium Convention) in 1925.

In 1934, Egypt submitted a complaint to the International Office of Public Hygiene against five proprietary medicines sold by Parke-Davis, then the largest international pharmaceutical corporation. The complaint led to an assessment of the five preparations and of Extractum Cannabis ("Indian hemp extract") in 1935 and 1938, and to a series of minor changes in international cannabis control in 1939, which were left without effect due to the outbreak of World War II.

In 1961, the Single Convention terminated and replaced all pre-existing drug control treaties, but only the 1925 Opium Convention included dispositions related to the plant.

=== International legal framework ===
==== Cannabis and the 1961 Single Convention ====
The Single Convention on Narcotic Drugs, 1961 makes a distinction between medical and scientific uses of drugs, and other uses. Nations are allowed to permit medical use of drugs, but the status of recreational use is unclear, and does not seem contemplated in Article 4:

The parties shall take such legislative and administrative measures as may be necessary […] Subject to the provisions of this Convention, to limit exclusively to medical and scientific purposes the production, manufacture, export, import, distribution of, trade in, use and possession of drugs.

The "provisions of this Convention" to which the limitation is subject, refers to three specific exemptions for traditional non-medical uses (article 49), industrial non-medical uses (article 2 paragraph 9) and the use of coca leaf as a flavoring agent (article 27).

===== Cannabis, resin, and extracts and tinctures =====
The Single Convention is the main international treaty related to Cannabis sativa L. and its products. In its Article 1, the Single Convention defines "cannabis" as the "flowering or fruiting tops of the cannabis plant (excluding the seeds and leaves when not accompanied by the tops) from which the resin has not been extracted, by whatever name they may be designated;" while "cannabis resin" is defined as "the separated resin, whether crude or purified, obtained from the cannabis plant." At the adoption of the Convention in 1961, cannabis and cannabis resin were listed in both Schedule I and Schedule IV.

Schedule I includes substances that are highly addictive and highly liable to substance use disorders, or that are convertible into controlled drugs, while Schedule IV lists "certain drugs listed in Schedule I that are highly addictive and highly liable to abuse and rarely used in medical practice." Schedule IV is a "stricter subset of schedule I, that specifies extra control measures."

====== 2020 cannabis descheduling ======
Since the adoption of the United Nations' Single Convention on Narcotic Drugs in 1961, cannabis and cannabis resin had been listed in Schedule IV, the most tightly restricted category, reserved for drugs that are "particularly liable to abuse and to produce ill effects" and whose "liability is not offset by substantial therapeutic advantages."

Its initial placement in this category was not based on science, and no international scientific assessment had been undertaken until 2018, when the World Health Organization initiated it, leading to the scheduling recommendation.

The removal of cannabis and cannabis resin from that Schedule entered into force in 2021, after a vote on 2 December 2020 by the UN Commission on narcotic drugs. Since 2021, cannabis and cannabis resin remain listed in Schedule I of the Single Convention, alongside extracts and tinctures of cannabis.

According to the WHO, the withdrawal of cannabis and cannabis resin from Schedule IV of the Convention was meant to remove "some international procedural barriers to research and development of cannabis- based medical products according to national regulatory frameworks." Some commentators argue that, by accepting only the withdrawal from Schedule IV, and not the other ECDD recommendations, the Commission on Narcotic Drugs "might actually be perpetuating the model initiated in the US state of California in 1996 and followed by dozens of other jurisdictions: that of sui generis, locally-oriented access programs, reliant on small- and medium-scale businesses and compound botanical medicines."

After the vote, a number of analysts continued to follow these views, arguing that the decision taken would have little legal consequences, if any. Others suggested that the change in legal status could facilitate access and availability to medical cannabis, or even legitimate the legalization of non-medical cannabis under Article 2(9) of the Single Convention.

===== Cannabis plant, cannabis leaves, and cannabidiol =====
The "cannabis plant" is defined as "any plant of the genus Cannabis" but has never been listed in any Schedule. Only cannabis and cannabis resin are listed in the Schedules of the Single Conventions. Since "drugs" are defined as those substances listed in the Schedules, "cannabis plant" is not considered a drug according to the Single Convention.

The "leaves" of cannabis plants are in a similar case: while it is not listed in the Schedules, and is therefore not a "drug" in the meaning of the Single Convention, "cannabis leaves" are subject to some light measures of control under Article 28 of the convention.

Since only "cannabis," "cannabis resin," and "extracts and tinctures of cannabis" are listed in the Schedules of the Single Convention, some analysts and governments consider that cannabidiol (CBD) is not a "narcotic drug" in the meaning of the Single Convention, while others such as the International Narcotics Control Board consider that actual CBD products are in fact extracts of cannabis and should therefore be considered as Scheduled.

==== Cannabis and the 1971 Convention ====
delta-9-THC (tetrahydrocannabinol, or dronabinol) is not listed in the Schedules of the Single Convention but in the Schedules of a distinct treaty: the Convention on Psychotropic Substances of 1971.

It has its own scheduling history: delta-9-THC was downgraded from Schedule I to Schedule II of the 1971 Convention in 1991, while other isomers of THC (such as delta-8-THC, delta-10-THC, etc.) remained in Schedule I.

==== Cannabis and the 1988 Convention ====
The Convention Against Illicit Traffic in Narcotic Drugs and Psychotropic Substances requires its Parties to establish criminal penalties for the activities related to drugs that are contrary to the 1961 Single Convention or the 1971 Convention.

=== Barriers to reform ===
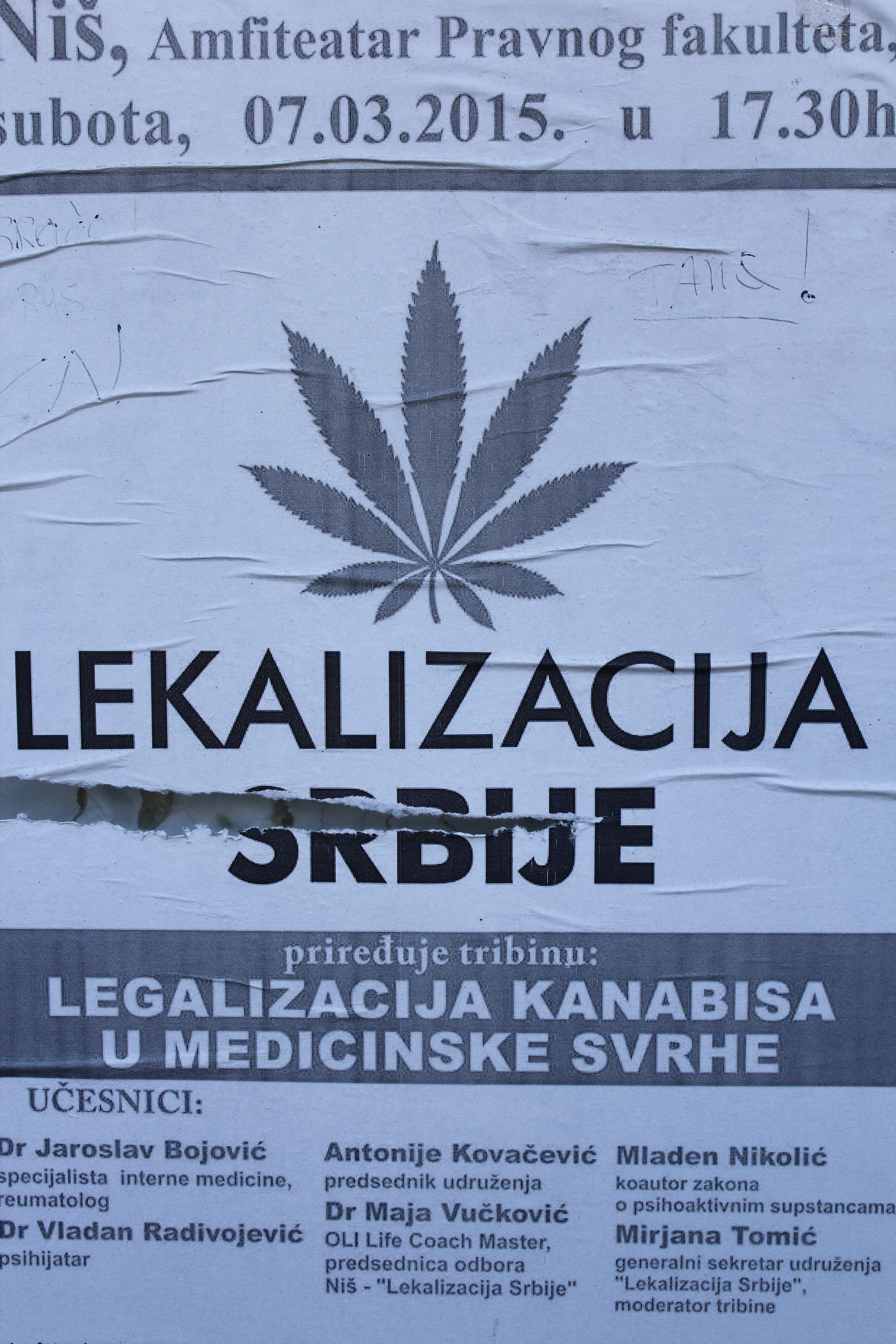
Pro-legalization poster in Belgrade, Serbia

Some barriers to cannabis reform are the result of the international drug control structure, while others are related to political circumstances.

==== Bureaucratic ====
The international drug control system is overseen by the United Nations General Assembly and UN Economic and Social Council. The Single Convention grants the Commission on Narcotic Drugs the power to reschedule controlled substances. Cindy Fazey, the former Chief of Demand Reduction for the United Nations Drug Control Programme, said:

"Theoretically, the conventions can be changed by modification, such as moving a drug from one schedule to another or simply by removing it from the schedules. However, this cannot be done with cannabis because it is embedded in the text of the 1961 Convention. Also, the modification would need a majority of the Commissions' 53 members to vote for it. Amendment to the conventions, that is changing an article or part of an article, does not offer a more promising route for the same reason. Even if a majority were gained, then only one state need ask for the decision to go to the Economic and Social Council for further consideration and demand a vote. The 1971 and 1988 Conventions need a two-thirds majority for change, not just a simple majority."

To modify cannabis regulations at the international level, a conference to adopt amendments in accordance with Article 47 of the Single Convention would be needed. This has been done once, with the 1972 Protocol Amending the Single Convention on Narcotic Drugs; as Fazey notes, this process is fraught with bureaucratic obstacles.

==== Political ====
In reference to situations where the Commission on Narcotic Drugs proposes changing the scheduling of any drug, 21 U.S.C. § 811(d)(2)(B) of The U.S. Controlled Substances Act gives the Secretary of Health and Human Services the power to issue recommendations that are binding on the U.S. representative in international discussions and negotiations:

"Whenever the Secretary of State receives information that the Commission on Narcotic Drugs of the United Nations proposes to decide whether to add a drug or other substance to one of the schedules of the Convention, transfer a drug or substance from one schedule to another, or delete it from the schedules, the Secretary of State shall transmit timely notice to the Secretary of Health and Human Services of such information who shall publish a summary of such information in the Federal Register and provide opportunity to interested persons to submit to him comments respecting the recommendation which he is to furnish, pursuant to this subparagraph, respecting such proposal. The Secretary of Health and Human Services shall evaluate the proposal and furnish a recommendation to the Secretary of State which shall be binding on the representative of the United States in discussions and negotiations relating to the proposal."

The U.S. Department of Justice Drug Enforcement Administration (DEA) denied in June 2011 a petition that proposed rescheduling of cannabis and enclosed a long explanation for the denial.

On 5 March 2013, the International Narcotics Control Board (INCB) urged the United States government to challenge the legalization of marijuana for recreational use in Colorado and Washington. INCB President, Raymond Yans stated that these state laws violate international drug treaties, namely the United Nations Single Convention on Narcotic Drugs of 1961. The Office of the US Attorney General said in December 2012 that regardless of any changes in state law, growing, selling or possessing any amount of marijuana remained illegal under federal law. Raymond Yans called the statement "good but insufficient" and said he hoped that the issue would soon be addressed by the US Government in line with the international drug control treaties.

A number of non-government organizations support the prohibition of cannabis as a recreational drug, like the World Federation Against Drugs.

==== Interpretative ====
According to some analysts, a country wanting to legalize marijuana would have to withdraw from the treaties to maintain compliance with its international legal obligations. The issue has become more pronounced with the legalization of recreational cannabis in Uruguay in 2013 and Canada in 2018, both countries interpreting that they are in direct violation of the Conventions due to their legalization of commercial cannabis sale and production. Withdrawal is an option that every signatory has a right to do.

Other analysts support the possibility to legalize cannabis in compliance with the treaties, basing the system on Article 2(9) of the Single Convention on narcotic drugs, allowing licit uses of drugs for "other than medical and scientific purposes."

== International intellectual property law ==
International intellectual property treaties, most of which are managed by the World Intellectual Property Organization (WIPO). Treaties in all classical areas of international law (marks, patents, copyright) generally apply to Cannabis, not containing any provision excluding narcotic drugs from their scope

For instance the WIPO's Patent Cooperation Treaty serves to file international patent registration for cannabis-related inventions, and the Madrid System applies for cannabis-related trademarks.

Related to the Madrid System are the WIPO treaties on Appellations of Origin (AO) and on Geographical Indications (GI). Two treaties, the Lisbon Agreement on the Protection of Appellations of Origin and their International Registration (1958) and its 2015 amendment focused on GIs (the Geneva Act of the Lisbon Agreement) are relevant to cannabis, although they have not been used as of 2024.

In addition, novel areas of international law such as plant breeders' rights under the International Union for the Protection of New Varieties of Plants (UPOV) are also applying to Cannabis, with the UPOV having issued specific guidance for Cannabis breeders.

=== Genetic resources and traditional knowledge: interaction between environmental and intellectual property law ===
Researchers have noted that "conventional [intellectual property rights] (patents and [plant breeders' rights]) work in favor of modern-day research in the developed world and offer little or no protection to the indigenous stakeholders."

The dispositions of environmental treaties such as the Plant Treaty and the Nagoya Protocol in part overlap with international intellectual property law, providing at times dispositions aimed at protecting Indigenous peoples and local communities. The Plant Treaty contains provisions on Farmers' rights, which have been seen as conflicting with UPOV in some instances. The Nagoya protocol, which includes dispositions to prevent the misappropriation of genetic resources (Cannabis strains) and associated traditional knowledge by third parties, and their intellectual property registration without due process or free, prior, and informed consent and mandates measures for the fair and equitable access and benefit sharing, applies to cannabis.

In 2022, a UN Trade and Development report on industrial hemp recommended:

The focus should then be on issues of access to, and utilization of, natural resources and associated knowledge. It would also be necessary to consider the threat to development and future trade posed by biopiracy or unsustainable bioprospecting and intellectual property rights practices. This could represent a threat to the control of national heritage and natural resources […] This suggests the need for access and benefit-sharing strategies to ensure that breeders, researchers and farmers, who are custodians of traditional varieties and cultivation knowledge, obtain a fair share of the monetary and non-monetary benefits from exploitation of those plants.

Recently, the WIPO Treaty on Intellectual Property, Genetic Resources and Associated Traditional Knowledge (GRATK Treaty) was adopted, seen by activists as a landmark agreement in the prevention of unethical bioprospecting and the fight against biopiracy. In its preamble, the GRATK Treaty mentions:

Acknowledging the United Nations Declaration on the Rights of Indigenous Peoples (UNDRIP) and commitment to achieving the ends set forth therein, and Affirming that best efforts should be made to include Indigenous Peoples and local communities, as applicable, in implementing this Treaty

In relation to this, it had been pointed out that the non-binding UNDRIP but also the UN Declaration on the Rights of Peasants (UNDROP) are relevant to the interpretation of States' obligations with regards to traditional and rural cannabis farming communities.

== International environmental law ==
Although Cannabis is not listed in the multilateral system established by the International Treaty on Plant Genetic Resources for Food and Agriculture, its general provisions apply to the plant, including in relation to farmers' rights.

The Convention on Biological Diversity also contains provisions applying to all forms of life and all plants considered "genetic resources". Its Nagoya Protocol contains more action-oriented provisions related to the sustainable use of biodiversity and access and benefit-sharing mechanisms.

== See also ==
- Cannabis plant – Cannabis (drug) – Legality of cannabis
- Centenary of Cannabis prohibition
- 1961 Single Convention on Narcotic Drugs – 1971 Convention on Psychotropic Substances – 1988 Convention against illicit drug trafficking
- Removal of cannabis and cannabis resin from Schedule IV of the Single Convention on narcotic drugs, 1961
