= International Opium Convention =

International Opium Convention can refer to:

- The First International Opium Convention, held in The Hague in 1912
- The Second International Opium Convention, held in Geneva in 1925
