= History of medical cannabis =

The history of medicinal cannabis goes back to the ancient times. Ancient physicians in many parts of the world mixed cannabis into medicines to treat pain and other ailments. In the 19th century, cannabis was introduced for therapeutic use in Western Medicine. Since then, there have been several advancements in how the drug is administered. Initially, cannabis was reduced to a powder and mixed with wine for administration. In the 1970s, synthetic THC was created to be administered as the drug Marinol in a capsule. However, the main mode of administration for cannabis is smoking because its effects are almost immediate when the smoke is inhaled. Between 1996 and 1999, eight U.S. states supported cannabis prescriptions opposing policies of the federal government. Most people who are prescribed marijuana for medical purposes use it to alleviate severe pain.

== Ancient China ==
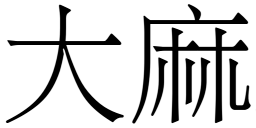
"Dàmá", the Chinese word for "cannabis", compounds "big; great" and "cannabis; hemp."

Cannabis, called má 麻 (meaning "hemp; cannabis; numbness") or dàmá 大麻 (with the compound Wikt:大, meaning "big; great") in Chinese, was used in Taiwan for fiber starting about 10,000 years ago. The botanist Hui-lin Li wrote that in China, "The use of Cannabis in medicine was probably a very early development. Since ancient humans used hemp seed as food, it was quite natural for them to also discover the medicinal properties of the plant." The oldest Chinese pharmacopeia, the (c. 100 AD) Shennong Bencaojing 神農本草經 ("Shennong's Materia Medica Classic"), describes cannabis.

The flowers when they burst (when the pollen is scattered) are called 麻蕡 (Pinyin: máfén) or 麻勃 (Pinyin: mábó). The best time for gathering is the seventh day of the seventh month. The seeds are gathered in the ninth month. The seeds which have entered the soil are injurious to man. It grows in Taishan (in Shandong ...). The flowers, the fruit (seed) and the leaves are officinal. The leaves and the fruit are said to be poisonous, but not the flowers and the kernels of the seeds.

The early Chinese surgeon Hua Tuo (c. 140–208) is credited with being the first recorded person to use cannabis as an anesthetic. He reduced the plant to powder and mixed it with wine for administration prior to conducting surgery. The Chinese term for "anesthesia" (mázui 麻醉) literally means "hemp intoxication". Elizabeth Wayland Barber says the Chinese evidence "proves a knowledge of the narcotic properties of Cannabis at least from the 1st millennium B.C." when ma was already used in a secondary meaning of "numbness; senseless." "Such a strong drug, however, suggests that the Chinese pharmacists had now obtained from far to the southwest not THC-bearing Cannabis sativa, but rather Cannabis indica.

Cannabis is one of the 50 "fundamental" herbs in traditional Chinese medicine, and is prescribed to treat diverse indications. FP Smith writes in Chinese Materia Medica: Vegetable Kingdom:

Every part of the hemp plant is used in medicine ... The flowers are recommended in the 120 different forms of (風 feng) disease, in menstrual disorders, and in wounds. The achenia, which are considered to be poisonous, stimulate the nervous system, and if used in excess, will produce hallucinations and staggering gait. They are prescribed in nervous disorders, especially those marked by local anaesthesia. The seeds ... are considered to be tonic, demulcent, alternative [restorative], laxative, emmenagogue, diuretic, anthelmintic, and corrective. ... They are prescribed internally in fluxes, post-partum difficulties, aconite poisoning, vermillion poisoning, constipation, and obstinate vomiting. Externally they are used for eruptions, ulcers, favus, wounds, and falling of the hair. The oil is used for falling hair, sulfur poisoning, and dryness of the throat. The leaves are considered to be poisonous, and the freshly expressed juice is used as an anthelmintic, in scorpion stings, to stop the hair from falling out and to prevent it from turning gray. ... The stalk, or its bark, is considered to be diuretic ... The juice of the root is ... thought to have a beneficial action in retained placenta and post-partum hemorrhage. An infusion of hemp ... is used as a demulcent drink for quenching thirst and relieving fluxes.

== Ancient Netherlands ==
In 2007, a late Neolithic grave attributed to the Beaker culture (found near Hattemerbroek, Gelderland; dated 2459-2203 BCE) was found containing an unusually large concentration of pollen. After five years of careful investigation these pollen were concluded to be mostly cannabis along with a smaller amount of meadowsweet. Due to the fever-reducing properties of meadowsweet, the archeologists speculated that the person in the grave had likely been very ill, in which case the cannabis would have served as painkiller.

== Ancient Egypt ==
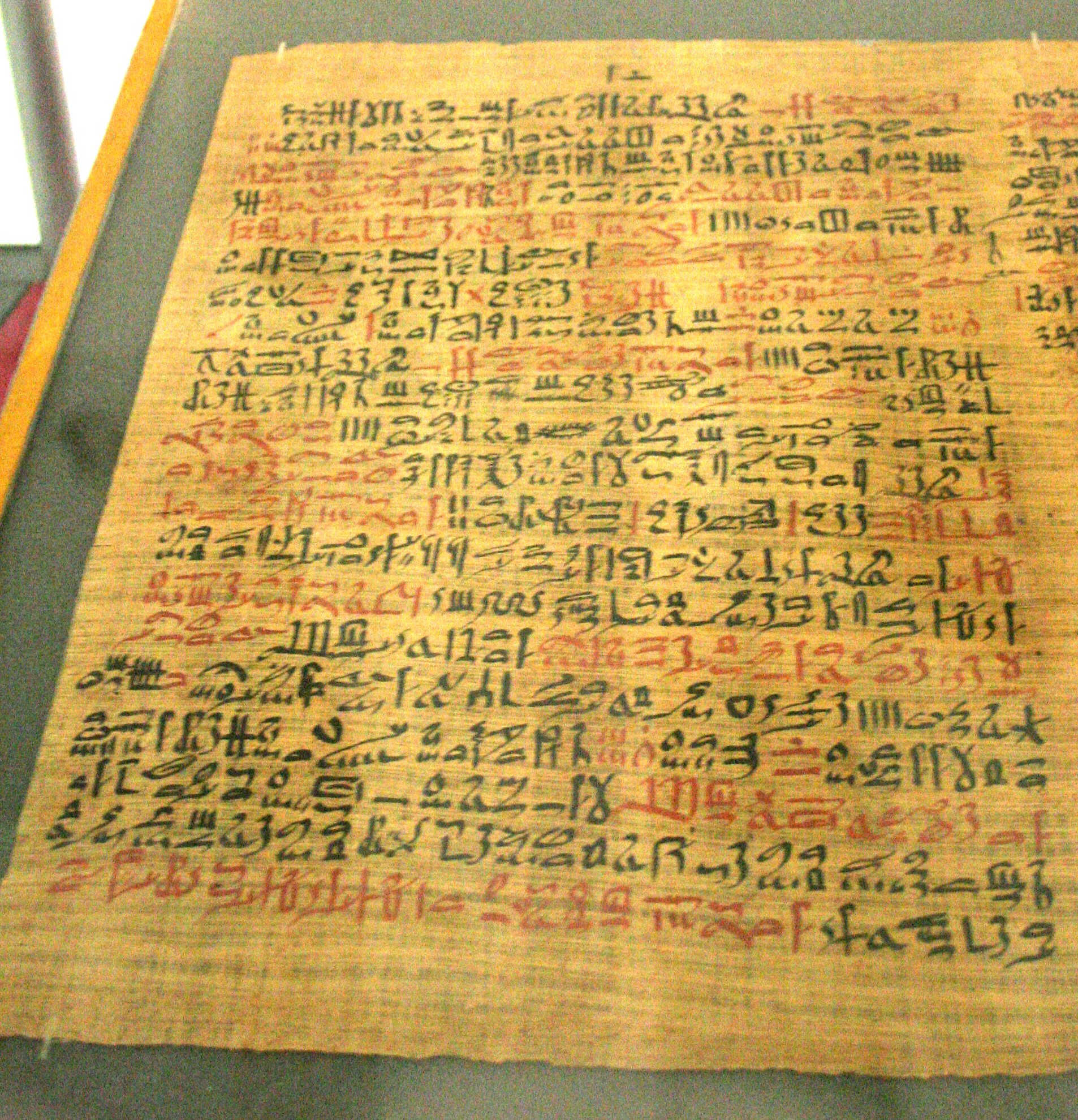
The Ebers Papyrus (c. 1550 BC) from Ancient Egypt has a prescription for medical marijuana applied directly for inflammation.

The Ebers Papyrus (c. 1550 BC) from Ancient Egypt describes medical cannabis. Other ancient Egyptian papyri that mention medical cannabis are the Ramesseum III Papyrus (1700 BC), the Berlin Papyrus (1300 BC) and the Chester Beatty Medical Papyrus VI (1300 BC). The ancient Egyptians used hemp (cannabis) in suppositories for relieving the pain of hemorrhoids. Around 2,000 BCE, the ancient Egyptians used cannabis to treat sore eyes. The egyptologist Lise Manniche notes the reference to "plant medical cannabis" in several Egyptian texts, one of which dates back to the eighteenth century BCE.

== Ancient India ==
Cannabis was a major component in religious practices in ancient India as well as in medicinal practices. For many centuries, most parts of life in ancient India incorporated cannabis of some form. Surviving texts from ancient India confirm that cannabis' psychoactive properties were recognized, and doctors used it for treating a variety of illnesses and ailments. These included insomnia, headaches, a whole host of gastrointestinal disorders, and pain: cannabis was frequently used to relieve the pain of childbirth. One Indian philosopher expressed his views on the nature and uses of bhang (a form of cannabis), which combined religious thought with medical practices. "A guardian lives in the bhang leaf. …To see in a dream the leaves, plant, or water of bhang is lucky. …A longing for bhang foretells happiness. It cures dysentery and sunstroke, clears phlegm, quickens digestion, sharpens appetite, makes the tongue of the lisper plain, freshens the intellect and gives alertness to the body and gaiety to the mind. Such are the useful and needful ends for which in His goodness the Almighty made bhang."

== Ancient Greece ==
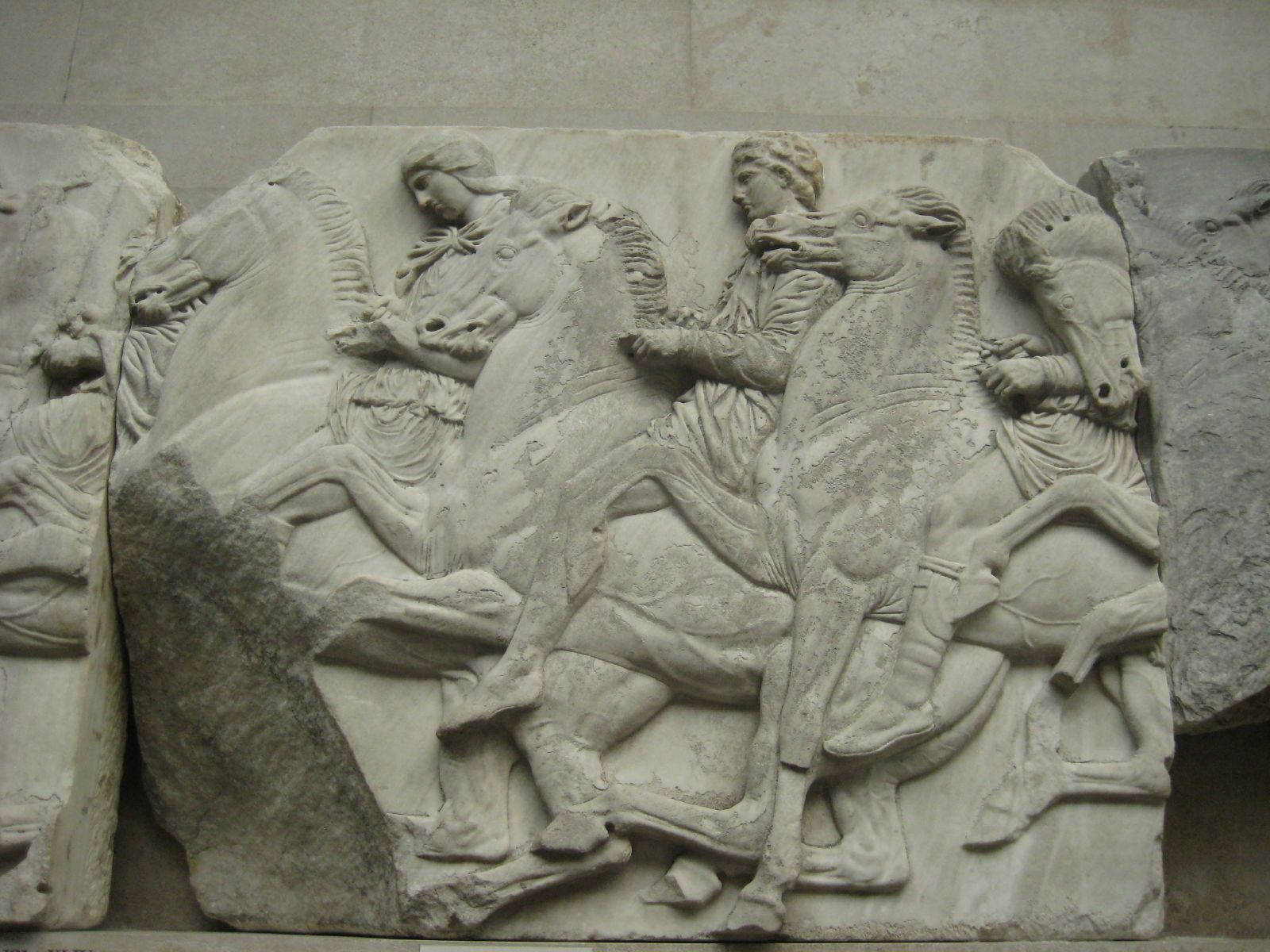
The Ancient Greeks used cannabis not only for human medicine, but also in veterinary medicine to dress wounds and sores on their horses.

The Ancient Greeks used cannabis to dress wounds and sores on their horses. In humans, dried leaves of cannabis were used to treat nose bleeds, and cannabis seeds were used to expel tapeworms. The most frequently described use of cannabis in humans was to steep green seeds of cannabis in either water or wine, later taking the seeds out and using the warm extract to treat inflammation and pain resulting from obstruction of the ear.

In the 5th century BC Herodotus, a Greek historian, described how the Scythians of the Middle East used cannabis in steam baths. These baths drove the people to a frenzied state.

== Medieval Islamic world ==
In the medieval Islamic world, including Northern Africa as well as Al-Andalus in present-day Spain and Portugal, Arabic physicians made use of the diuretic, antiemetic, antiepileptic, anti-inflammatory, analgesic and antipyretic properties of Cannabis sativa, and used it extensively as medication from the 8th to 18th centuries.

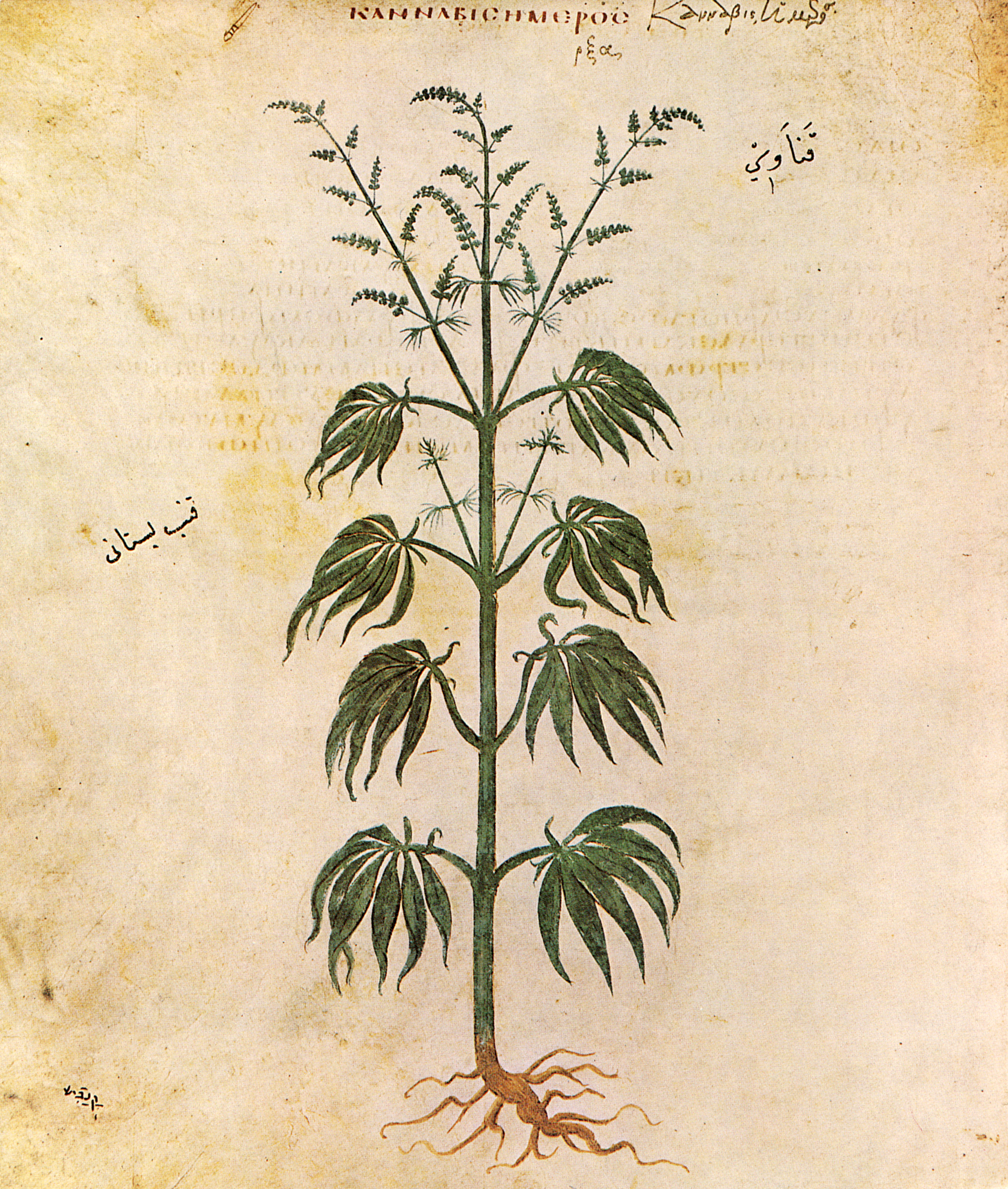
Cannabis sativa from Vienna Dioscurides, 512 AD

== Modern history ==
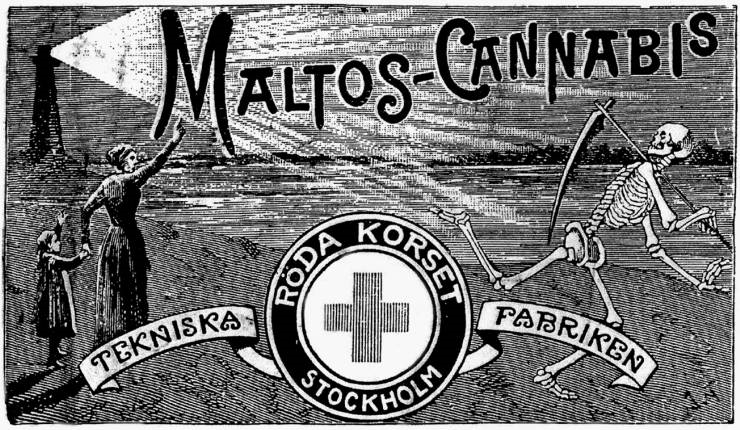
An advertisement for Maltos-Cannabis, a Scandinavian cannabis-based drink popular in the early 20th century

In the mid 19th century, medical interest in the use of cannabis began to grow in the West. In the 19th century cannabis was one of the secret ingredients in several so-called patent medicines. There were at least 2,000 cannabis medicines prior to 1937, produced by more than 280 manufacturers. The advent of the syringe and injectable medicines contributed to an eventual decline in the popularity of cannabis for therapeutic uses, as did the invention of new drugs such as aspirin.

An Irish physician, William Brooke O'Shaughnessy, is credited with introducing the therapeutic use of cannabis to Western medicine in English-speaking countries. He was Assistant-Surgeon and Professor of Chemistry at the Medical College of Calcutta, and conducted a cannabis experiment in the 1830s, first testing his preparations on animals, then administering them to patients to help treat muscle spasms, stomach cramps or general pain. Modern medical and scientific inquiry began with doctors like O'Shaughnessy and Moreau de Tours, who used it to treat melancholia and migraines, and as a sleeping aid, analgesic and anticonvulsant. At the local level, authorities introduced various laws which required preparations containing cannabis and were to be sold over the counter must be marked with warning labels under the so-called poison laws. In 1905 Samuel Hopkins Adams published an exposé entitled "The Great American Fraud" in Collier's Weekly about the patent medicines that led to the passage of the first Pure Food and Drug Act in 1906. This statute did not ban alcohol, narcotics, and stimulants in the medicines; rather, it required medicinal products to be labeled as such and curbed some of the more misleading, overstated, or fraudulent claims that previously appeared on labels.

At the turn of the 20th century the Scandinavian maltose- and cannabis-based drink Maltos-Cannabis was widely available in Denmark and Norway. Promoted as "an excellent lunch drink, especially for children and young people", the product had won a prize at the Exposition Internationale d'Anvers in 1894. A Swedish encyclopedia from 1912 claim that European hemp, the raw material for Maltos-Sugar, almost lacked the narcotic effect that is typical for Indian hemp and that products from Indian hemp was abandon by modern science for medical use. Maltos-Cannabis was promoted with text about its content of maltose sugar.

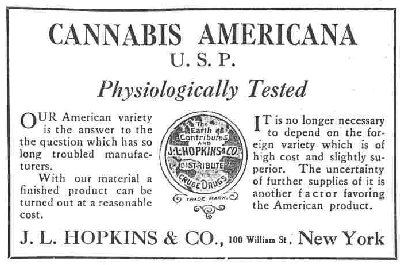
An advertisement for cannabis americana distributed by a pharmacist in New York in 1917

Later in the century, researchers investigating methods of detecting cannabis intoxication discovered that smoking the drug reduced intraocular pressure. In 1955 the antibacterial effects were described at the Palacký University of Olomouc. Since 1971 Lumír Ondřej Hanuš was growing cannabis for his scientific research on two large fields in authority of the university. The marijuana extracts were then used at the university hospital as a cure for aphthae and haze. In 1973 physician Tod H. Mikuriya reignited the debate concerning cannabis as medicine when he published "Marijuana Medical Papers". High intraocular pressure causes blindness in glaucoma patients, so he hypothesized that using the drug could prevent blindness in patients. Many Vietnam War veterans also found that the drug prevented muscle spasms caused by spinal injuries suffered in battle.

In 1964, Dr. Albert Lockhart and Manley West began studying the health effects of traditional cannabis use in Jamaican communities. They discovered that Rastafarians had unusually low glaucoma rates and local fishermen were washing their eyes with cannabis extract in the belief that it would improve their sight. Lockhart and West developed, and in 1987 gained permission to market, the pharmaceutical Canasol: one of the first cannabis extracts. They continued to work with cannabis, developing more pharmaceuticals and eventually receiving the Jamaican Order of Merit for their work.

=== Canada ===
The medicinal use of cannabis became legal in Canada in 2001, though was not increasingly popularized until about 13 years later in 2014. It became more popular after the regulations were updated and the diagnosing physicians were able to diagnose specific amounts and dosages for up to a 30-day supply.

=== United States ===
In the 1970s, a synthetic version of THC was produced and approved for use in the United States as the drug Marinol. It was delivered as a capsule, to be swallowed. Patients complained that the violent nausea associated with chemotherapy made swallowing capsules difficult. Further, along with ingested cannabis, capsules are harder to dose-titrate accurately than smoked cannabis because their onset of action is so much slower. Smoking has remained the route of choice for many patients because its onset of action provides almost immediate relief from symptoms and because that fast onset greatly simplifies titration. For these reasons, and because of the difficulties arising from the way cannabinoids are metabolized after being ingested, oral dosing is probably the least satisfactory route for cannabis administration.

Robert Randall of the United States successfully used a medical necessity defense when he was charged with illegal possession of cannabis to treat his glaucoma. The case, United States v. Randall (1976), is "The first successful articulation of the medical necessity defense in the history of the common law, and indeed, the first case to extend the necessity defense to the crimes of possession or cultivation of marijuana".

Voters in eight U.S. states showed their support for cannabis prescriptions or recommendations given by physicians between 1996 and 1999, including Alaska, Arizona, California, Colorado, Maine, Michigan, Nevada, Oregon, and Washington, going against policies of the federal government. In May 2001, "The Chronic Cannabis Use in the Compassionate Investigational New Drug Program: An Examination of Benefits and Adverse Effects of Legal Clinical Cannabis" (Russo, Mathre, Byrne et al.) was completed. This three-day examination of major body functions of four of the five living US federal cannabis patients found "mild pulmonary changes" in two patients.

In several medical marijuana cases, the patients' physicians have been willing to testify in court that the patients' conditions require the medicine. However, the US Supreme Court rejected the medical necessity defense in the landmark case United States v. Oakland Cannabis Buyers' Cooperative (2001), ruling that there is no medical necessity exception to the federal Controlled Substances Act's prohibition on manufacturing and distributing marijuana. In Gonzales v. Raich (2005), the Supreme Court ruled that federal drug laws could be enforced against patients using medical marijuana in compliance with state law. On the other hand, in Raich v. Gonzales (2007), the Ninth Circuit Court of Appeals addressed a severely ill patient's argument that her medicinal use of marijuana was justified by necessity. The court found that the evidence supported her need for medicinal marijuana, but still refused to prevent the federal government from enforcing the law against her.

In Maryland, a bill signed by Governor Robert Ehrlich became law in 2003 to permit patients to use medical necessity defense to marijuana possession in the state. The maximum penalty for such users cannot exceed $100. However, the law does not prevent federal prosecution of patients since the federal law does not recognize medical necessity.

Among the more than 108,000 persons in Colorado who in 2012 had received a certificate to use marijuana for medical purposes, 94% said that severe pain was the reason for the requested certificate, followed by 3% for cancer and 1% for HIV/Aids. The typical card holder was a 41-year-old male. Twelve doctors had issued 50% of the certificates. Opponents of the card system claim that most card holders are drug abusers who are faking or exaggerating their illnesses; three-fourths male patients is not the normal pattern for pain patients, it is the normal pattern for drug addicts, claim the critics.

As of early 2024, 34 of the 50 US states have legalized the medical use of cannabis.

Medical cannabis was further legalized with the Removal of cannabis from Schedule I of the Controlled Substances Act in April, 2026. The Medical Marijuana Dispensary Registration Portal was set up by the U.S. Drug Enforcement Administration a few days later.

== See also ==
- History of cannabis
- Medical cannabis
