= First International Opium Convention =

First international opium control treaty

1912 Opium Convention Hague Opium Convention
International Opium Convention signed at The Hague, January 23rd, 1912, and Protocols of cloture signed at The Hague on January 23rd, 1912; July 9th, 1913; and June 25th, 1914.
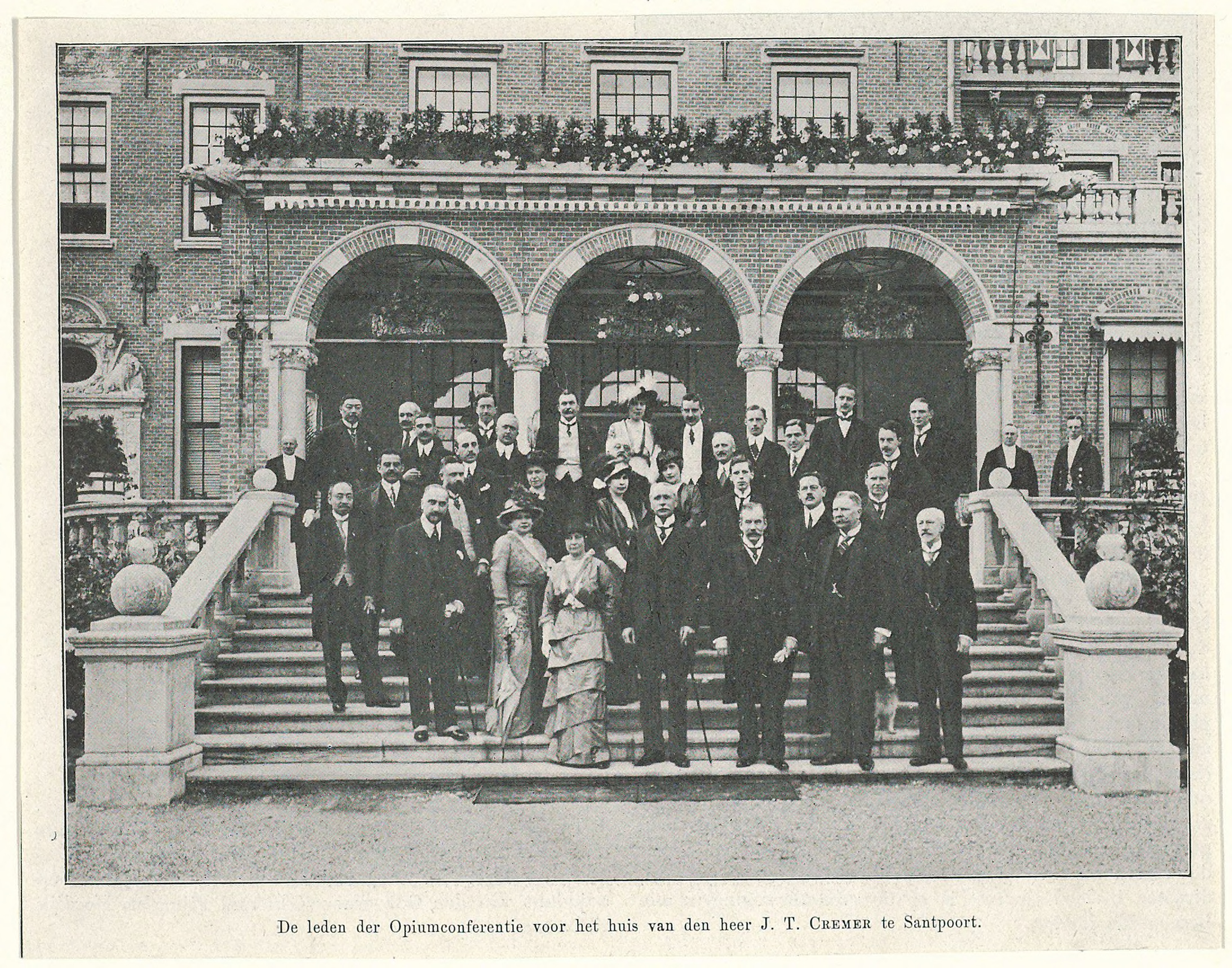
- Signed: 23 January 1912
- Location: The Hague
- Effective: 28 June 1919
- Expiration: 13 December 1964

The First International Opium Convention (also called 1912 Opium Convention or Hague Opium Convention) is a former international treaty signed at The Hague in 1912. The conference were an international effort by states to regulate the trade of opium and suppress illicit opium consumption. It was followed in 1925 by the Second International Opium Convention signed in Geneva.

== Background ==
The 1912 Opium Convention is often considered the first international drug control treaty.

There were previous instruments establishing international dispositions related to medicinal drugs, like the 1890 Brussels Conference Act regulating alcohol trade in colonial African territories, or the 1902 international pharmacopoeia agreement.

However, the preceding international document seen as a direct predecessor of the 1912 Opium Convention was the outcome document of the International Opium Commission, a meeting held in Shanghai in 1909. The 13-nation International Opium Commission of Shanghai had been held in response to increasing criticism of the opium trade and to settle the Opium Wars. A few years later, in 1912, the First International Opium Conference was convened in The Hague to continue the discussions initiated in Shanghai and formalise them into a proper treaty.

== The Hague's International Opium Conference, 1912 ==
The Conference was held in The Hague in 1912 and organised by The Netherlands, after the country offered to host the next Conference while attending the International Opium Commission in Shanghai in 1909.

The 1912 Opium Convention was signed at the end of the Hague Conference, on 23 January 1912. It was registered in League of Nations Treaty Series on January 23, 1922. The treaty was signed by Germany, the United States, China, France, the United Kingdom, Italy, Japan, the Netherlands, Persia, Portugal, Russia, and Siam. The convention was in force by 1915 for and between the United States, Netherlands, China, Honduras, and Norway. It went into force globally in 1919, when it was incorporated into the Treaty of Versailles.

== Provisions of the Hague Convention ==
The convention provided:

The contracting Powers shall use their best endeavours to control, or to cause to be controlled, all persons manufacturing, importing, selling, distributing, and exporting morphine, cocaine, and their respective salts, as well as the buildings in which these persons carry such an industry or trade.

The primary objective of the convention was to introduce restrictions on exports; it did not entail any prohibition or criminalisation of the uses and cultivation of opium poppy, the coca plant, or cannabis. According to Raymond Leslie Buell, the 1912 Opium Convention largely failed at achieving its intended goals, as the agreement reached was vague and left the enforcement of opium restrictions in national control:

In view of the vagueness of its provisions, the Hague Convention of 1912 —which by the way did not go into effect until January, 1920— has had very little effect upon the opium policies of the powers in their Far Eastern colonies, where smoking is prevalent. As far back as 1905 the United States prohibited the use of opium in the Philippines, except for medical purposes, while in 1897 Japan adopted in Formosa an equally effective policy of licensing addicts. […] The British apply the same system to Burma, while Siam also adopted it in 1921, but postponed its application, presumably because of the need of revenue.

The constatation of the limitation of the 1912 Convention led, after 1920, to the idea of convening a new Opium Conference to issue "supplementary agreements providing for some form of international control". This would come in 1925 with a Second International Opium Convention, as well as a Protocol on Opium, both adopted in Geneva.

== See also ==
- Second International Opium Convention (Geneva)
- International Drug Control
- International law
- Single Convention on Narcotic Drugs
- League of Nations
- Office international d'hygiène publique
- Timeline of cannabis law
- Legal issues of cannabis
- Brussels Pharmacopoeia Agreement (1902)
