= Camille Barrère =

French diplomat

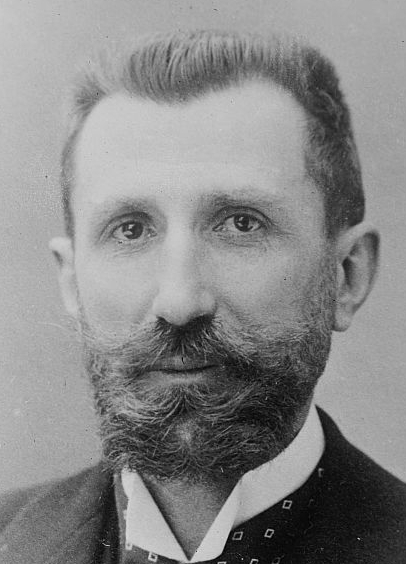

France Ambassador to Italy
- In office 1897–1924
- Preceded by: Albert Billot
- Succeeded by: René Besnard

Personal details
- Born: 23 October 1851 La Charité-sur-Loire, France
- Died: 7 October 1940 (aged 88) Paris, France
- Occupation: Diplomat
- Awards: Legion of Honour

Camille Barrère (23 October 1851 – 7 October 1940) was a French diplomat, most notably the ambassador to Italy from 1897 to 1924.

In 1902, Barrère negotiated a secret accord with Italian Minister of Foreign Affairs Giulio Prinetti that ended both countries' historical rivalry for North Africa. The Prinetti-Barrère Accord stated that in the event of a redistribution of Ottoman lands in Northern Africa, France would not contest an Italian claim on the lands of the Tripolitania Vilayet, which makes up modern Libya. In return, Italy would not contest a French claim on the Ottoman territory of Morocco. The agreement allowed for the French Agadir Crisis in Morocco in 1911 and the Italo-Turkish War of 1911–1912, which resulted in the taking of both territories. Barrère also was a key figure in arranging the 1915 secret Treaty of London between Italy and the Triple Entente, which resulted in Italy abandoning its Triple Alliance partners of Germany and Austro-Hungary during the First World War.

Barrère had sympathy for the early fascist movements in Italy and "viewed the nascent fascist movement with almost unalloyed favour and enthusiasm." Reportedly, he even personally provided financial support to Benito Mussolini.

Barrère, who had participated in all International Sanitary Conferences since that of 1892, giving him the informal title of the "Mathusalem of international sanitary action", was one of the driving forces behind the founding of the Office international d'hygiène publique (created in 1906, it is seen as a predecessor of WHO with which it was merged after World War II).

== See also ==
- Office international d'hygiène publique
- League of Nations
- International Sanitary Conferences
- Foreign relations of France
- France–Italy relations
- Treaty of London (1915)
- Société financière française et coloniale
