= Ganja Law =

The Ganja Law, or Dangerous Drugs (Amendment) Act 2015, was passed by Jamaica's Houses of Parliament in February 2015. The law went into effect on April 15, 2015, making possession of two ounces (57 g) or less of cannabis a "non-arrestable, ticketable offence, that attracts no criminal record". Jis.gov claims "It also puts in place, regulations for marijuana use by persons of the Rastafarian faith and for medical, therapeutic and scientific purposes, including development of a legal industry for industrial hemp and medical marijuana." Earlier revisions of the laws were critiqued for being unduly harsh on citizens. A 1913 law passed to conform to the First International Opium Convention unilaterally added cannabis, and was seen as "fear of the black population". For instance, the 1964 ganja law was considered to be punitive towards poor people, as were the 1963 and 1965 laws regarding flogging.
