= International Sanitary Conferences =

Meetings about human disease epidemics, 1851–1938

The International Sanitary Conferences were a series of 14 international meetings held in response to growing concerns about human disease epidemics. The first of the Sanitary Conferences was organized by the French Government in 1851 to standardize international quarantine regulations against the spread of cholera, plague, and yellow fever. In total 14 conferences took place from 1851 to 1938; the conferences played a major role in the formation of the Office international d'hygiène publique before World War II, and the World Health Organization in 1948.

== Background ==
Efforts by governments to control disease eruptions trace their origins to the mid-fourteenth century. During this time period, the city-state of Venice (considered to be the first international center of commerce) was first to apply quarantine procedures to protect their population and territory against plague. However, it was not until the second cholera pandemic in 1829, that European Governments would appoint medical missions to investigate the cause of an epidemic. Among others, the Royal Academy of Medicine of Paris in June 1831 sent Auguste Gérardin and Paul Gaimard on medical mission to Russia, Prussia, and Austria.

In 1834, by appointment from the Minister of Commerce, the Secretary of the Conseil supérieur de la santé, P. de. Ségur-Dupeyron, was task with creating a report on the sanitary regulations of Mediterranean countries. This report called attention to numerous differing quarantine requirements among countries and to resulting unnecessary confusion. This document and over 15 years of continued perseverance by the French Government ultimately led to convening an international conference to standardise quarantine requirements against exotic diseases; the International Sanitary Conferences - 1851–1938.

== Chronology ==
#	Venue	Year	Notes
1	Paris	1851	The pioneer movement; adopts a draft Sanitary Convention and draft International Sanitary Regulations
2	Paris	1859	Indecision time.
3	Istanbul	1866	Discussion and common agreement on the propagation cause of cholera.
4	Vienna	1874	
5	Washington	1881	First conference in which the United States participated.
6	Rome	1885	
7	Venice	1892	The first International Sanitary Convention adopted.
8	Dresden	1893	
9	Paris	1894	
10	Venice	1897	
11	Paris	1903	Chaired by Camille Barrère
12	Paris	1911–1912	Chaired by Barrère
13	Paris	1926	Adoption of the International Maritime Sanitary Convention; Chaired by Barrère
14	Paris	1938	

=== Paris, 1851 ===
The first International Sanitary Conference opened in Paris on July 23, 1851. A total of twelve countries participated, including Austria, Great Britain, Greece, Portugal, Russia, Spain, France, Ottoman Empire, and the four Italian Powers of the Papal States, Sardinia, Tuscany, and the Two Sicilies, each country being represented by a pair of a physician and a diplomat.

The Conference revolved around the question of whether or not cholera should be subject to quarantine regulations. The Papal States, Tuscany, the Two Sicilies, Spain, and Greece supported quarantine measures against cholera, while Sardinia, Austria, Britain, and France opposed quarantine measures.

The Austrian medical delegate, G. M. Menis, along with John Sutherland, the British medical delegate, and Anthony Perrier, the British diplomatic delegate, were most vocal against quarantine measures. The Spanish medical delegate, Pedro F. Monlau (es), and the Russian medical delegate, Carlos O. R. Rosenberger, were in the opposite camp.

The Conference participants agreed on a draft Sanitary Convention and annexed draft International Sanitary Regulations consisting of 137 articles.

=== Paris, 1859 ===
The second International Sanitary Conference opened in Paris on April 9, 1859. Except the Kingdom of the Two Sicilies, all twelve countries of the first Conference were present. The conference, which lasted for five months, resulted in Austria, France, Great Britain, the Papal States, Portugal, Russia, Sardinia, and Spain signing the slightly amended "draft convention" (itself a combination of the convention and the annexed international sanitary regulations agreed on the first conference). Greece and Turkey abstained.

=== Constantinople, 1866 ===
The third International Sanitary Conference opened in Istanbul on 13 February 1866 under the initiative of the French Government after the 1865 cholera outbreak in Europe.

=== Vienna, 1874 ===
The fourth International Sanitary Conference opened in Vienna on 1 July 1874.

=== Washington, 1881 ===
The fifth International Sanitary Conference in Washington, DC, was the first conference in which the United States participated.

=== Rome, 1885 ===
The sixth International Sanitary Conference opened in Rome on 20 May 1885 by the Italian government as a result of the reappearance of cholera in Egypt in 1883.

=== Venice, 1892 ===
The seventh International Sanitary Conference in Venice was the occasion for the adoption of the first International Sanitary Convention.

=== Dresden, 1893 ===
The eighth International Sanitary Conference opened in Dresden on 11 March 1893 under the initiative of the Austria-Hungarian government with nineteen European countries as participants.

=== Paris, 1894 ===
The ninth International Sanitary Conference opened in Paris on 7 February 1894 with France as its convener and sixteen countries as participants.

=== Venice, 1897 ===
The tenth International Sanitary Conference opened in Venice on 16 February 1897 with Austria-Hungary as its proposer and was the first such conference concerned exclusively with plague. In 1907 the Office international d'hygiène publique (OIHP) was created, among others, with the mandate to carry on the different dispositions adopted by the Sanitary Conventions; the OIHP was later on harmonized within the League of Nations' Health Organization.

=== Paris, 1903 ===
The eleventh International Sanitary Conference met in Paris from 10 October to 3 December 1903.

=== Rome, 1907 ===
There was no Conference as such in 1907, however, 11 countries met in Rome to adopt an Arrangement establishing the Office international d'hygiène publique (International Office of Public Health) in Paris.

=== Paris, 1911–1912 ===
The twelfth International Sanitary Conference opened in Paris on 7 November 1911 and closed on 17 January 1912 with 41 countries being represented. This was the first conference to be held after the creation of the Office international d'hygiène publique in 1907-1908. It was chaired, like the 1903, 1907 and 1926 Conferences, by the French diplomat Camille Barrère which had strong views about global health, commerce and politics.

=== Paris, 1926 ===
The thirteenth International Sanitary Conference was held in Paris from 10 May to 21 June 1926 with over 50 sovereign states as participants.

=== The Hague, 1933 ===
There was no conference in 1933, but in The Hague representatives of various countries signed the International Sanitary Convention for Aerial Navigation, which went into force on 1 August 1935.

=== Paris, 1938 ===
The fourteenth and last International Sanitary Conference was convened by the French Government at the instigation of Egypt on 28 October 1938 with representatives of almost 50 countries as participants.

=== Additional events ===
- 1907: Rome Arrangement creating the International Office of Public Hygiene (OIHP)
- 1914–1918: World War I
- 1918–1920: Great Influenza Pandemic
- 1933: Adoption of the International Sanitary Convention for Aerial Navigation (1933)
- 1939–1945: World War II
- 1944: Amendment of the 1926 International Maritime Sanitary Convention and the 1933 International Sanitary Convention for Aerial Navigation. Development of the first International Certificate of Vaccination against Smallpox.
- 1948: Formation of the World Health Organization
- 1951: 4th World Health Assembly adopted the International Sanitary Regulations. Quarantinable diseases included cholera, yellow fever, plague, smallpox, relapsing fever, typhoid.
- 1969: WHO revises the International Sanitary Regulations to become the International Health Regulations. The revised IHR focused on 4 quarantinable diseases: cholera, yellow fever, plague and smallpox.
- 1981: With successful eradication of smallpox, quarantinable diseases revised to cholera, yellow fever and plague.

=== After World War II ===
The World Health Organization (WHO) was formed in 1948. In 1951, the WHO issued their first infectious disease prevention regulations, the International Sanitary Regulations (ISR 1951), which focussed on six quarantinable diseases; cholera, plague, relapsing fever, smallpox, typhoid and yellow fever.

In 1969, the ISR were revised and renamed the International Health Regulations.

== See also ==
- International Monetary and Economic Conferences

== Notes ==
Norman Howard-Jones (1974). The scientific background of the International Sanitary Conferences, 1851-1938 (PDF). World Health Organization.
