= World Conference on Cultural Policies and Sustainable Development =

High level UNESCO cultural policy meeting held every 4 years

Coordinates: 22.9098°S 43.1763°W

MONDIACULT World Conference on Cultural Policies and Sustainable Development
- Frequency: irregular (1982-2022); every 4 years (2025-present)
- Locations: Mexico 1982; Sweden 1998; Mexico 2022; Spain 2025
- Years active: 43
- Inaugurated: 1982, Mexico City
- Website: Official website

The World Conference on Cultural Policies and Sustainable Development (MONDIACULT) (Note: French: "MONDIA" from "mondial" (world); CULT for "culture") is a series of international events and the world’s largest cultural policy conference during which Member States of UNESCO work together to set and commit to the global agenda for culture.

It was first held in 1982 in Mexico, and re-launched in 2022. MONDIACULT is now intended to take place every four years.

== History and Background ==
=== First Conferences on Cultural Policy ===
In 1982, the first World conference on cultural policy, first of its kind, was organized by the UNESCO in Mexico City, Mexico. The conference affirmed culture as a fundamental dimension of development, and the need for cultural policies at the national level. Between 1988 and 1998, the World Decade for Cultural Development followed, helping in the development of landmark international policy frameworks and guidelines on the safeguard and promotion of culture and cultural diversity.

In 1998, in Stockholm, Sweden, the UNESCO Stockholm Conference on Cultural Policies for Development defined a new global agenda of cultural policies for development. Major outcomes of that conference included a focus on cultural diversity, the role of culture in human development, and on cultural industries.

=== A decade of Treaties on Culture ===
After these two conferences, a series of international legal texts were produced.

In 2001, UNESCO released the Universal Declaration on Cultural Diversity.

Two years later, the Convention for the Safeguarding of the Intangible Cultural Heritage was approved, committing to "safeguarding living heritage and placing it on equal footing with built and movable heritage, noting that it constitutes the mainspring of cultural diversity and contributes to anchoring culture in development from a human-centered perspective."

The Convention on the Protection and Promotion of the Diversity of Cultural Expressions followed in 2005.

=== Second round of Conferences on Cultural Policy ===
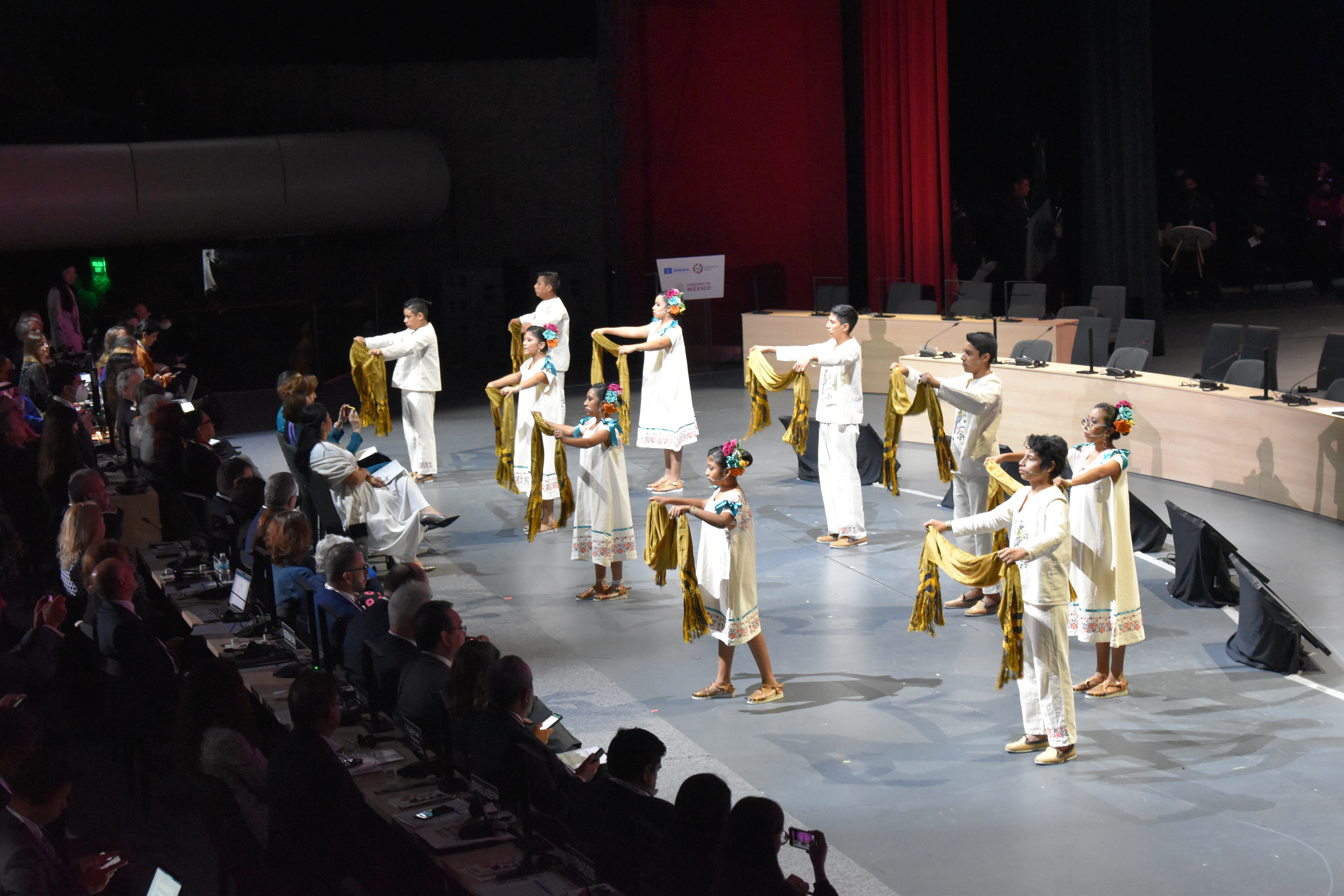
Performance by Los Semilleros Creativos (Creative Seedbeds), a community-based artistic training group for children and youth living in vulnerable conditions, during MONDIACULT 2022.

==== MONDIACULT 2022 ====
From 28 to 30 September 2022, in an effort to renew and expand the global cultural agenda, UNESCO convened MONDIACULT 2022, again in Mexico City. The conference gathered over 150 states and resulted in the adoption of a Final Declaration recognizing culture as a global public good and calling for its inclusion in the post-2030 Sustainable Development Agenda. The MONDIACULT 2022 Final Declaration also instructed the UNESCO Director-General to reconvene the Conference every four years, starting in 2025, as well as the preparation of a "Global Report on Cultural Policies" to be presented at each MONDIACULT conference.

==== MONDIACULT 2025 ====
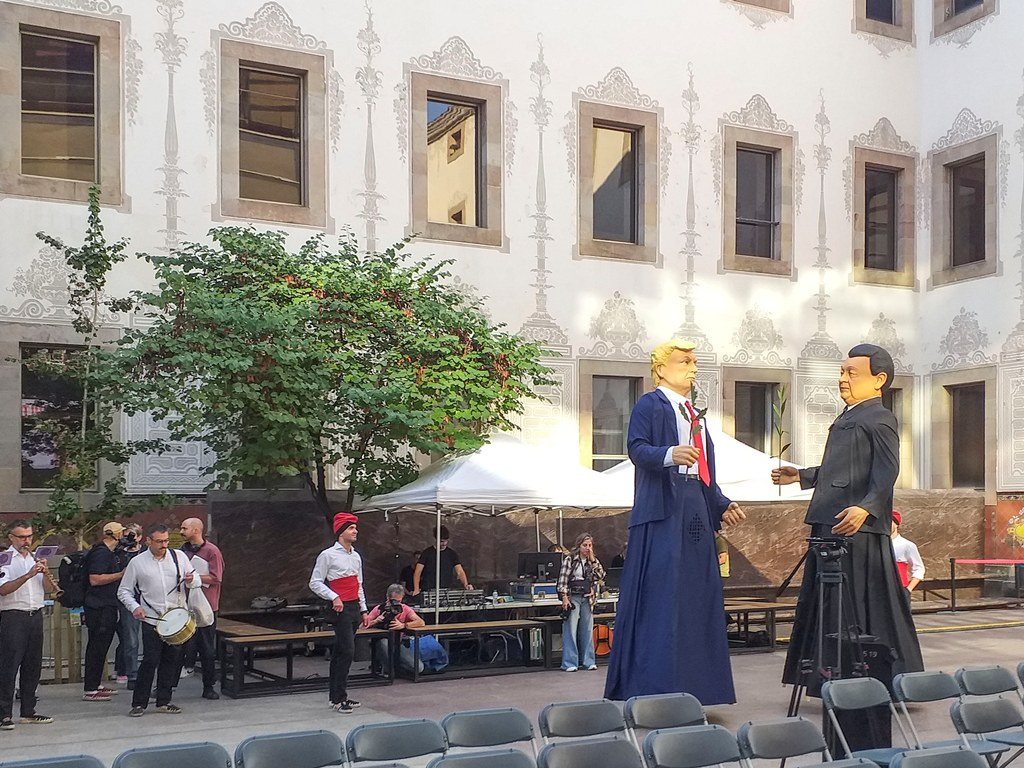
Performance of popular culture of Barcelona during MONDIACULT 2025: Dance of two costumed figuress, several meters tall, representing the geopolitical dance of Donald Trump and Xi Jinping, accompanied by a marching band

Pursuant to the 2022 Declaration, a new world conference on cultural policy took place in Barcelona, Spain from September 26 to October 1, 2025. Thousands of participants and more than 150 ministers of culture gathered to set the global agenda for culture in the years ahead. Calls for peace in Gaza drew loud applause at the opening ceremony.

As in 2022, regional consultations were held prior to the Conference, in late 2024 and early 2025.

The UNESCO launched Culture: The Missing SDG, its first edition of its Global Report on Cultural Policies.

A number of parallel fora were organized alongside the main three-days Conference, including a forum of young people, a meeting of cities and local governments, a forum on the centenary of cannabis prohibition, and the main "Ágora Cívica", a joint initiative promoted by the Barcelona City Council, the Barcelona Provincial Council, the Government of Catalonia, and the Ministry of Culture bringing together key international figures in the defense of cultural rights, such as Alexandra Xanthaki, UN Special Rapporteur on Cultural Rights, and Patrice Meyer-Bisch, promoter of the Fribourg Declaration." Finally, the Conference included various side-events. concluded by the Barcelona Declaration on Cultural Rights, understanding culture as a space for identity building, resistance, and freedom.

The Mondiacult forum concluded without any binding decisions, but the participants agreed on two main axes: placing cultural rights at the center of public policies and integrating culture as a specific area within the United Nations post-2030 development agenda.

The final document, approved by all delegations, proposes to protect creators against the impact of artificial intelligence to avoid situations of precariousness and digital exploitation.

== Objectives ==
The goal of UNESCO is relaunching MONDIACULT as a quadriennal cycle of conferences is to "[reinvest] in the global policy dialogue in the field of culture, building on its mandate and expertise to foster multilateral cooperation and action."

Unlike other UNESCO expert summits or forums, MONDIACULT is ministerial and state-led body. It works on a cross-sectoral basis and is meant to be policy-cohesive across the cultural field, bridging policies on heritage, creativity, education, environment, and rights. The goals of MONDIACULT Conferences are to define the long-term cultural agenda, with links to the broader United Nations system.

In 2022, the Conference stated 5 objectives:

- Stimulate the global reflection on culture as a global public good,
- Support the adaptation of cultural policies in the cultural sector itself,
- Advance countries’ strategic priorities pertaining to cultural policies,
- Strengthen the role of culture for peace building,
- Federate international cooperation platforms.

In 2025, the Conference had 6 themes (Cultural rights; Digital technologies in the culture sector; Culture and education; Economy of culture; Culture and climate action; Culture, heritage and crisis) and two focus areas (Culture for peace; Artificial intelligence and culture) with the following objectives:

- Strengthen multilateral action, collaboration, and solidarity among countries to shape the global cultural agenda,
- Report on progress, opportunities and challenges in implementing the six priority areas of the 2022 MONDIACULT Declaration as well as two focus areas,
- Foster inclusive and participatory dialogues on cultural policies with a broad range of stakeholders including young people,
- Identify the priorities to be considered in the drafting of a stand-alone goal for culture in the post-2030 development agenda,
- Support UNESCO Member States in strengthening cultural information systems to improve public policies.

== See also ==
- UNESCO
- Sustainable Development Goals
- Culture
- Cultural rights
- Cultural policy
