= Medical Marijuana Dispensary Registration Portal =

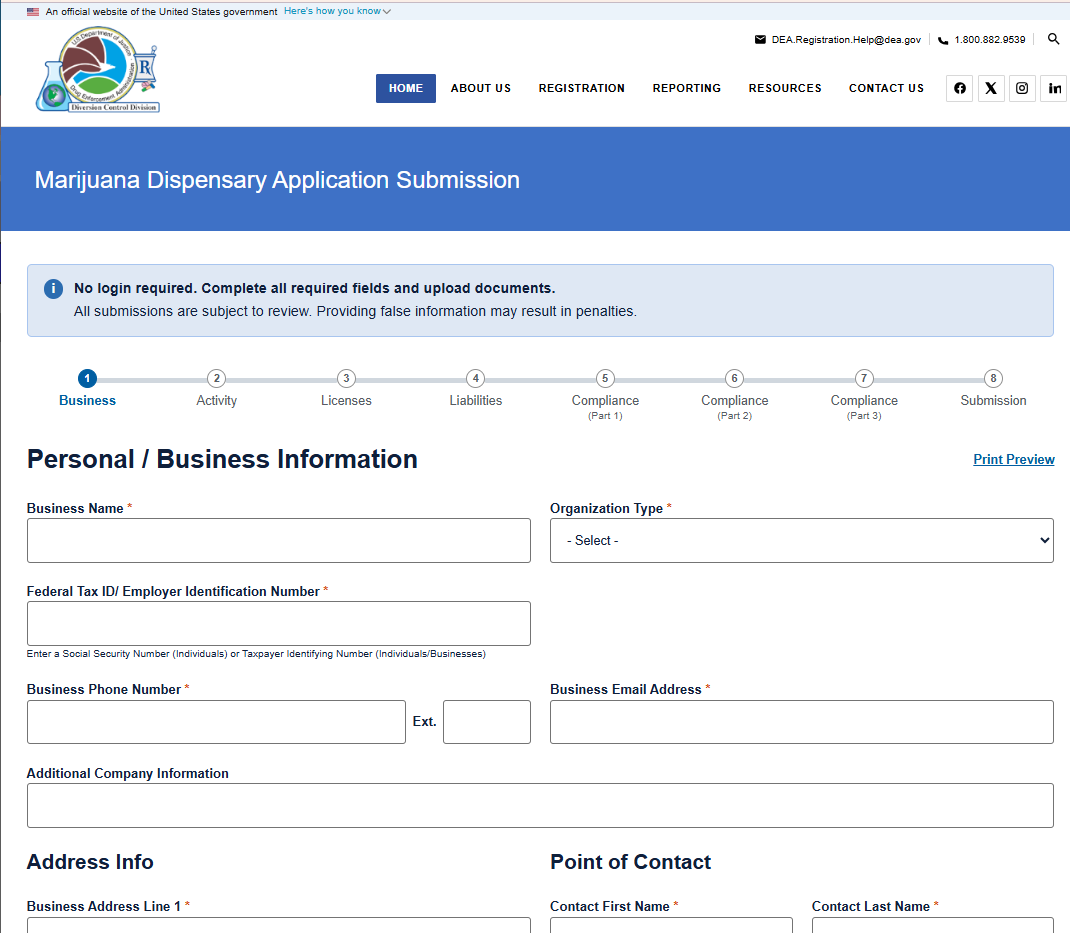
- Screenshot of the Medical Marijuana Dispensary Registration Portal shortly after its creation
- Website type: Government services web portal
- Available in: English
- Country of origin: United States
- Owner: United States Drug Enforcement Administration
- Industry: Cannabis regulation
- Launched: April 29, 2026; 4 months ago

Medical Marijuana Dispensary Registration Portal is a US government web portal created shortly after the removal of cannabis from Schedule I of the Controlled Substances Act to Schedule III in 2026. Cannabis industry entities involved with medical cannabis can register with the Drug Enforcement Administration through the website to allow DEA to act in its anti-drug diversion capacity by indicating the business's legitimacy, allowing it to avoid federal investigation and possible prosecution. It will also allow state-legal businesses for the first time to deduct operating expenses on federal taxes, formerly prohibited under IRS Section 280E. The portal opened on April 29, 2026.
