= Timeline of cannabis law =

The list includes and details significant events that occurred in the global history of national-level implementations of, or changes made to, laws surrounding the use, sale, or production of the psychoactive drug cannabis.

== 1300s ==
- 1378: Soudoun Sheikouni, the Emir of the Joneima in Arabia, outlawed the use of cannabis across his jurisdiction. Sheikouni's prohibition is one of the earliest, if not the earliest, attested cannabis ban in the world.

== 1700s ==
- 1787: Madagascar's King Andrianampoinimerina took the throne, and soon after banned cannabis throughout the Merina Kingdom, implementing capital punishment as the penalty for its use.

== 1800s ==
- 1800: Years after Napoleon's invasion of Egypt, his general Jean-Baptiste Menou, concerned by the troops' smoking of hashish and drinking of cannabis-based beverages, created a limited ban against soldiers consuming the drug.
- 1830: The Municipal Council of Rio de Janeiro, Brazil, prohibited bringing cannabis into the city, and punished its use by any slave.
- 1840: The British colony of Mauritius banned cannabis.
- 1860: Spain adds haschisch to its list of controlled drugs (although enforcement was low).
- 1861: British Guiana passed a law entitled An Ordinance to Regulate the Sale of Opium and Bhang.
- 1867: The British colonial government of Sri Lanka introduced the Opium and Bhang Ordinance, restricting the sale of cannabis to licensed dealers only.
- 1870: The British Natal Colony (now in South Africa) passed the Coolie Law Consolidation prohibiting: "the smoking, use, or possession by and the sale, barter, or gift to, any Coolies [Indian indentured workers] whatsoever, of any portion of the hemp plant (Cannabis sativa)..."
- 1877: The Ottoman government in Constantinople mandated that all hashish in Egypt be destroyed, and in 1879 importation of cannabis was banned by the Khedivate of Egypt.
- 1890: Morocco's Sultan Hassan I instituted strict regulations on cultivation and trade, but also conferred clear cannabis production privileges on several Rif tribes.
- 1890: Greece banned the cultivation, importation, and use of cannabis.
- 1894: In British India the Indian Hemp Drugs Commission released its findings, concluding that "The moderate use practically produces no ill effects. In all but the most exceptional cases, the injury from habitual moderate use is not appreciable."

== 1900s ==
- 1902: First international pharmacopoeia Conference, cannabis is not included due to ignorance of its active compounds.
- 1913: Jamaica banned cannabis with the Ganja Law, supported by the white ruling class and the Council of Evangelical Churches in Jamaica.
- 1914: British East Africa Protectorate banned cannabis.
- 1920: Sierra Leone banned cannabis.
- 1920: Mexico banned the cultivation, sale, and recreational use of cannabis.
- 1922: South Africa banned cannabis nationally, under the Customs and Excises Duty Act.
- 1923: Canada banned cannabis.
- 1923: Panama banned the cultivation and use of cannabis.
- 1923: In Italy, the Mussolini-Oviglio Law 396/23 banned the use of both marijuana and hashish.
- 1924: Sudan banned the cultivation and use of cannabis.
- 1925: The League of Nations signs the Second International Opium Convention of 1925, for the first time adding pure cannabis extract among drugs under international control.
- 1925: At the Brussels Conference for the harmonization of pharmacopoeia, "Cannabis herb" extract and tinctures were added to the monographs of the international pharmacopoeia treaty.
- 1925: Trinidad and Tobago banned cannabis.
- 1926: Lebanon prohibited hashish.
- 1926: Australia banned cannabis.
- 1927: Indonesia banned cannabis.
- 1928: The United Kingdom first prohibited cannabis as a drug, adding it as an addendum to the Dangerous Drugs Act 1920 (10 & 11 Geo. 5. c. 46).
- 1928: Romania established laws for countering narcotics, including hashish and its preparations.
- 1934: The Irish Free State prohibited cannabis and cannabis resin with the Dangerous Drugs Act 1934.
- 1935: The Office international d'hygiène publique recommends adding preparations of cannabis (and not only pure extracts) under control of the Second International Opium Convention of 1925.
- 1935: Thailand criminalized cannabis.
- 1937: The United States passed the Marijuana Tax Act, effectively prohibiting most use of cannabis on a federal level due to the heavy burdens of the tax.
- 1939: Burma legalized and licensed the production and sale of cannabis.
- 1948: Japan adopted the Cannabis Control Law, establishing a licensing system for dealers, and punishments for unlicensed use or sale.
- 1951: Poland classified cannabis as a narcotic.
- 1953: Tunisia, under French rule, banned cannabis.
- 1953: The Netherlands criminalized cannabis.
- 1956: Morocco becomes independent, and banned cannabis by royal decree.
- 1961: The United Nations Single Convention on Narcotic Drugs decreed: "The use of cannabis for other than medical and scientific purposes must be discontinued as soon as possible but in any case within twenty-five years..."
- 1965: New Zealand banned cannabis under the Narcotics Act.
- 1966: Finland prohibited cannabis.
- 1968: The government of the Republic of Vietnam "publicly condemned" the use or trafficking of cannabis, and instructed local chiefs to prevent its cultivation.
- 1969: Iceland & Denmark banned cannabis.
- 1970: The United States passed the Controlled Substances Act, prohibiting cannabis federally along with several other drugs and replacing the 1937 act.
- 1972: The Netherlands divided drugs into more- and less-dangerous categories, with cannabis being in the lesser category. Accordingly, possession of 30 grams or less was made a misdemeanor.
- 1973: Nepal canceled the licenses of all cannabis shops, dealers, and farmers, under pressure from the United States and the international community.
- 1973: Afghanistan's King Zahir Shah outlawed cannabis production, followed by genuine commitment to eradication, backed by $47 million in funding from the United States government.
- 1975: Comoros' Ali Soilih seized power, and among other radical reforms to gain the support of youth, legalized cannabis in Comoros.
- 1975: In Italy, hemp fields all but disappeared following the passage of the anti-drug Cossiga Law 685/75.
- 1976: South Korea passed the Cannabis Control Act.
- 1988: Paraguay decriminalized personal possession of 10 grams of cannabis or less.
- 1989: Bangladesh banned the sale of cannabis.
- 1990: In Italy, the Presidential Decree DPR 309/90 was passed into law, regarding the discipline of narcotics and psychotropic substances, prevention, treatment, and rehabillitation of the related stages of substance dependence, and it is reportedly responsible for 35% of the current national prison population.
- 1992: Lebanon banned and eradicates cannabis, under US pressure.
- 1993: In Italy, a referendum repealed criminal penalties for the personal use of soft drugs.
- 1996: California becomes the first jurisdiction in the United States to legalize cannabis for medicinal use (Proposition 215).
- 1997: Poland criminalized possession of cannabis.

== 2000s ==
- 2001: Luxembourg decriminalized cannabis.
- 2001: Canada legalized cannabis for medical use.
- 2001: Portugal decriminalized cannabis.
- 2003: Belgium decriminalized cannabis.
- 2004: Russia decriminalized cannabis.
- 2005: Estonia decriminalized cannabis.
- 2005: Chile decriminalized cannabis.
- 2006: Brazil decriminalized possession and cultivation of personal amounts of cannabis.
- 2008: Austria legalized cannabis for medical use.
- 2009: Ukraine decriminalized cannabis cultivation up to 10 cannabis plants for personal use.
- 2009: Mexico decriminalized possession of up to 5 grams of cannabis.
- 2009: Argentina decriminalized cannabis.
- 2010: Czech Republic decriminalized cannabis.
- 2011: Denmark approves drugs containing synthetic-cannabinoids (dronabinol) for medical use.
- 2012: Switzerland decriminalized possession of 10 grams or less to a fine.
- 2012: Colombia decriminalized possession of 20 grams or less.
- 2013: Croatia decriminalized possession of cannabis.
- 2013: Uruguay legalized cannabis.
- 2013: Italy legalized cannabis for medical use.
- 2013: Romania legalized cannabis for medical use.
- 2013: Czech Republic legalized cannabis for medical use.
- 2013: France legalized synthetic-cannabinoids for medical use.
- 2015: Malta decriminalized cannabis.
- 2015: Colombia legalized cannabis for medical use.
- 2015: Croatia legalized synthetic-cannabinoids for medical use.
- 2015: Jamaica decriminalized possession of up to 2 ounces of cannabis and legalized the cultivation for personal use of up to 5 plants.
- 2015: Spain decriminalized cannabis cultivation up to 10 cannabis plants for personal use.
- 2016: Austria decriminalized possession of small amounts of cannabis.
- 2016: North Macedonia legalized cannabis for medical use.
- 2016: Australia legalized cannabis for medical use.
- 2016: Poland legalized cannabis for medical use.
- 2016: Norway legalized cannabis for medical use.
- 2016: Georgia's Supreme Court ruled that imprisonment for possession of small amounts of cannabis is unconstitutional.
- 2017: Germany legalized cannabis for medical use.
- 2017: Cyprus legalized cannabis oil for advanced stage cancer patients.
- 2017: Belize decriminalized possession or use of 10 grams or less on private premises.
- 2017: Greece legalized cannabis for medical use.
- 2017: Peru legalized cannabis oil for medical use.
- 2017: Luxembourg legalized cannabis for medical use.
- 2017: Lesotho legalized cannabis for medical use.
- 2017: Georgia decriminalized cannabis.
- 2017: Lithuania criminalized cannabis.
- 2017: Spain legalized cannabis.
- 2018: Denmark legalized synthetic-cannabinoids for medical use.
- 2018: Malta legalized cannabis for medical use.
- 2018: Portugal legalized cannabis for medical use.
- 2018: Lithuania legalized synthetic-cannabinoids for medical use.
- 2018: South Korea legalized cannabis for medical use.
- 2018: Zimbabwe legalized cannabis for medical use.
- 2018: Canada legalized cannabis.
- 2018: Thailand legalized cannabis for medical use.
- 2018: South Africa decriminalized cannabis.
- 2018: The United Kingdom legalized cannabis for medical use.
- 2018: The World Health Organization starts its first scientific assessment of cannabis for medical uses mandated under treaty law.
- 2019: Ireland legalized cannabis for medical use.
- 2019: Israel decriminalized cannabis.
- 2019: Trinidad and Tobago decriminalized cannabis allowing up to 30 grams per individual and cultivation of four plants per household.
- 2020: Australian Capital Territory legalized cannabis possession and growth for personal use.
- 2020: Malawi legalized cannabis for medical use.
- 2020: Lebanon legalized cannabis for medical use.
- 2020: United Nations partially deschedules cannabis by removing it from most restrictive substances list.
- 2021: Mexico officially decriminalizes adult use of cannabis, after years of de facto decriminalization.
- 2021: Rwanda legalizes cannabis for medical use.
- 2021: Malta legalized cannabis relying on Article 2 paragraph 9 of the Single Convention on narcotic drugs.
- 2022: Thailand legalized cannabis.
- 2023: Luxembourg legalized cannabis.
- 2023: Switzerland legalized cannabis on trial basis.
- 2023: Ukraine legalized cannabis for medical use.
- 2024: Germany legalized cannabis.
- 2025: Centenary of Cannabis Prohibition–Global Cannabis History Year commemorates 100 years since the Opium Convention and Pharmacopoeia Treaty.

== See also ==
- Cannabis rights
- Timeline of cannabis laws in the United States
- Legality of cannabis
- Timeline of psychedelic legalization and decriminalization
