= Second International Opium Convention =

Historic 1925 drug control treaty

1925 Geneva Opium Convention
International Convention, Adopted by the Second Opium Conference (League of Nations), and Protocol relating thereto. Signed at Geneva, February 19, 1925.
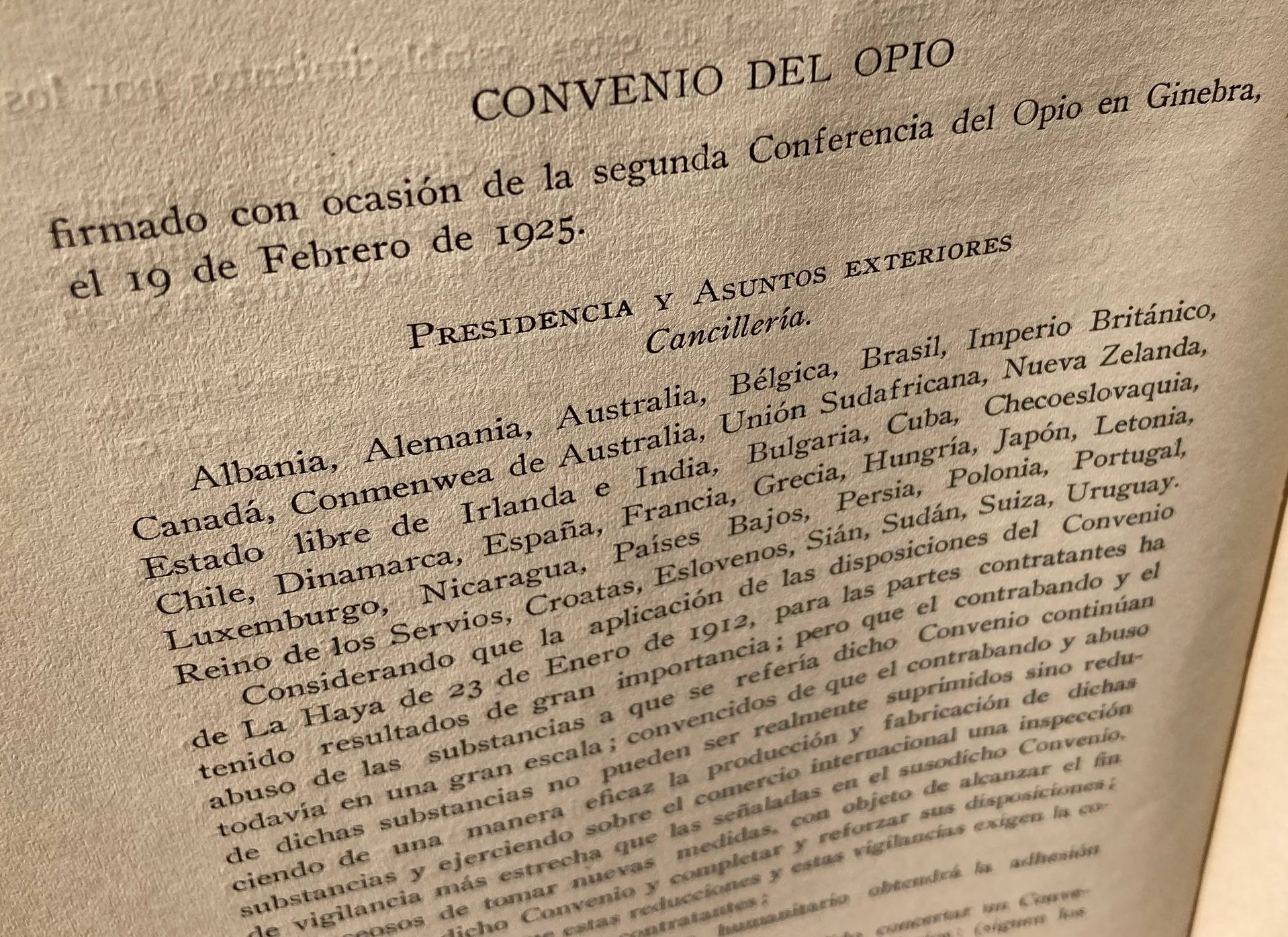
- Type: Drug control
- Drafted: September 1924 – February 1925
- Signed: 19 February 1925
- Location: The Hague
- Expiration: 13 December 1964

The Second International Opium Convention (also known as the Geneva Opium Convention or 1925 Opium Convention) is an international treaty signed at Geneva in 1925. The convention was an update of the efforts from the 1912 Hague Opium Convention.

The 1925 Convention introduced a statistical control system to be supervised by a Permanent Central Opium Board (a body independent but partly linked to the League of Nations), narrowed down a number of legal measures on opium, morphine, and cocaine, and placed introduced a system of international control for extracts and tinctures of cannabis.

== History ==
In 1912, a first International Opium Conference had been convened in The Hague, Netherlands, which had resulted in the First International Opium Convention. After the Paris Peace Conference which followed the World War I, the Hague Opium Convention came into force globally. Because it had numerous shortcomings, the international community felt the need to issue "supplementary agreements providing for some form of international control". This resulted in two new international legal instruments put in the discussions in 1925: the Second Opium Convention and the Opium Protocol.

The convention was adopted a week after the Protocol, both concluded in Geneva by the same negotiators. However, the two treaties have no direct relation. They have different scopes, and their measures do not overlap. Another treaty adopted a few months later in Brussels would likewise affect the policies of drugs controlled under the 1925 Geneva Opium Convention, without direct connexion or overlap.

In 1925, a Second International Opium Conference was convened in Geneva at the Palais Wilson, headquarters of the League of Nations (then called "Palais des nations"). The final text (the convention) was signed in Room F or Orange Room of the League's headquarters in Geneva, on 19 February 1925.

The Convention went into effect on 25 September 1928, and was registered in League of Nations Treaty Series on the same day.

== Legal provisions ==
=== Permanent Central Opium Board ===
The 1925 Convention provided for the setting up of a Permanent Central Opium Board (PCOB). It started operating in 1928. Although a treaty-mandated body, theoretically independent from the League of Nations, it became partially-integrated into the structure of the League.

The PCOB was first known as the Permanent Central Opium Board, then as the Permanent Central Narcotics Board. It is sometimes referred to as Permanent Central Board.

In 1931 the Board was supplemented by the creation of another organ under the "Limitation Convention": the Drug Supervisory Body ("Organe de Contrôle") which, together with the PCOB, was eventually merged onto the International Narcotics Control Board in 1968.

=== Cannabis control ===
Egypt, with support from Italy and South Africa, recommended that measures of control be extended beyond opium and cocaine derivatives, to hashish. A sub-committee was created, and proposed the following text:

The use of Indian hemp and the preparations derived therefrom may only be authorized for medical and scientific purposes. The raw resin (charas), however, which is extracted from the female tops of the cannabis sativa L, together with the various preparations (hashish, chira, esrar, diamba, etc.) of which it forms the basis, not being at present utilized for medical purposes and only being susceptible of utilisation for harmful purposes, in the same manner as other narcotics, may not be produced, sold, traded in, etc., under any circumstances whatsoever.

India and other countries objected to this language, citing social and religious customs and the prevalence of wild-growing cannabis plants that would make it difficult to enforce.

A compromise was made that banned exportation of Indian hemp to countries that have prohibited its use, and requiring importing countries to issue certificates approving the importation and stating that the shipment was required "exclusively for medical or scientific purposes."

The convention also required Parties to "exercise an effective control of such a nature as to prevent the illicit international traffic in Indian hemp and especially in the resin." These restrictions still left considerable leeway for countries to allow production, internal trade, and use of cannabis for recreational purposes. It should also be noted that the convention's control measures only applied to pure extracts and tinctures of cannabis (at 100% strength) but not to any medicines containing it. Consequently, any cannabis-containing product other than pure and raw Cannabis extract felt outside of the legal realm of the convention. This was the case "even [for] those containing 99 parts or more of Indian hemp extract […] to one part or less of any indifferent substance"

In 1935, Egypt requested the International Office of Public Hygiene to extend controls to any medication containing any proportion of cannabis. The request was granted in 1939, after which, the 1925 Opium Convention moved on to control any cannabis medicine regardless of its composition.

== After the Second World War ==
The 1925 and 1935–39 episodes led some historians to consider as "racist" the roots and rationale behind the inclusion of cannabis in the 1925 Convention.

After the second world war, the two Opium Conventions were amended to transfer the mandates and functions of the League of Nations and the Office international d'hygiène publique to the United Nations and World Health Organization. Eventually, both the 1912 and the 1925 Conventions were superseded by the 1961 Single Convention on Narcotic Drugs which merged the Permanent Central Opium Board and the Drug Supervisory Body onto the INCB.

== See also ==
- Brussels Pharmacopoeia Agreement (1925)
- Centenary of Cannabis prohibition
- First International Opium Convention (The Hague)
- International Drug Control
- International law
- League of Nations
- Legal issues of cannabis
- Office international d'hygiène publique
- Single Convention on Narcotic Drugs
- Timeline of cannabis law
