= Indian hemp =

Indian hemp may refer to any of various fiber bearing plants:

- Apocynum cannabinum, also known as dogbane
- Cannabis indica
- Crotalaria juncea, native to India
- Sida rhombifolia
- Asclepias incarnata, native to North America
- Hibiscus cannabinus
