= International Office of Public Hygiene =

Predecessor to the World Health Organization

Office International d'Hygiène Publique
- 1907–1946
- Emblem used by the OIHP, depicting Hygieia
- Status: Former international organization
- Administrative center: 195 boulevard Saint-Germain, Paris; 48°51′17″N 2°19′31″E
- Official languages: French
- Recognized languages: French
- History
  - Arrangement of Rome: 9 December 1907
  - Dissolution: 22 July 1946
Succeeded by
World Health Organization

The International Office of Public Hygiene (OIPH), also known by its French name as the Office International d'Hygiène Publique (OIHP), was an international organization founded 9 December 1907 and based in Paris, France. It merged into the World Health Organization in 1946.

It is the world's first universal health organization. Member states exchanged information about the presence and spread of disease, as well as provided recommendations for sanitation. The organization helped restructure public health services in Greece and China in the late 1920s.

== History ==
It was created to oversee international rules regarding the quarantining of ships and ports to prevent the spread of plague and cholera, and to administer other public health conventions, leading to engage on other epidemics, and the collection of broader epidemiological data on various diseases, as well as such issues as the control of medicinal opium, cannabis, and other drugs, the traumas created by World War I, etc.

The idea to establish an international office for the purpose of acquiring and disseminating information about communicable diseases such as cholera and yellow fever was first proposed in 1903 at the International Sanitary Convention in Paris. The French government assumed the responsibility of drafting a proposal for establishing an organization and the final draft was submitted in August 1907. A following conference was held in Rome on December 3, of that same year, and in attendance were delegates from Belgium, Brazil, British India, Egypt, France, Great Britain, Holland, Italy, Portugal, Romania, Russia, Spain, Switzerland, and the United States. After some modifications, all delegates except from Romania, signed the organic statutes on December 9.

November 4, 1908, a committee composed of members from each country that ratified the document met at the Ministry of Foreign Affairs in Paris. This would be the blueprint of the body's permanent form. Its responsibilities were to create the bureau, draw up its regulations, supply its expenses, and direct its first operations.

The OIHP was part of the complex structure known as the Health Organization (Organisation d'Hygiène) of the League of Nations, in an often-competing, and sometimes collaborative relation with the League of Nations' Health Committee.

The OIHP was dissolved by protocols signed 22 July 1946 and its epidemiological service was incorporated into the Interim Commission of the World Health Organization on 1 January 1947. However, the OIHP remained in existence legally until 1952.

In 1930, the Permanent committee for the OIHP played a role in addressing an outbreak of plague at various ports along the Mediterranean coast. In response to this outbreak, the committee first requested information regarding antiplague vaccine distribution regarding the type and quantity of vaccines distributed. The office also tasked a commission with developing a serum that could identify various bacterias.

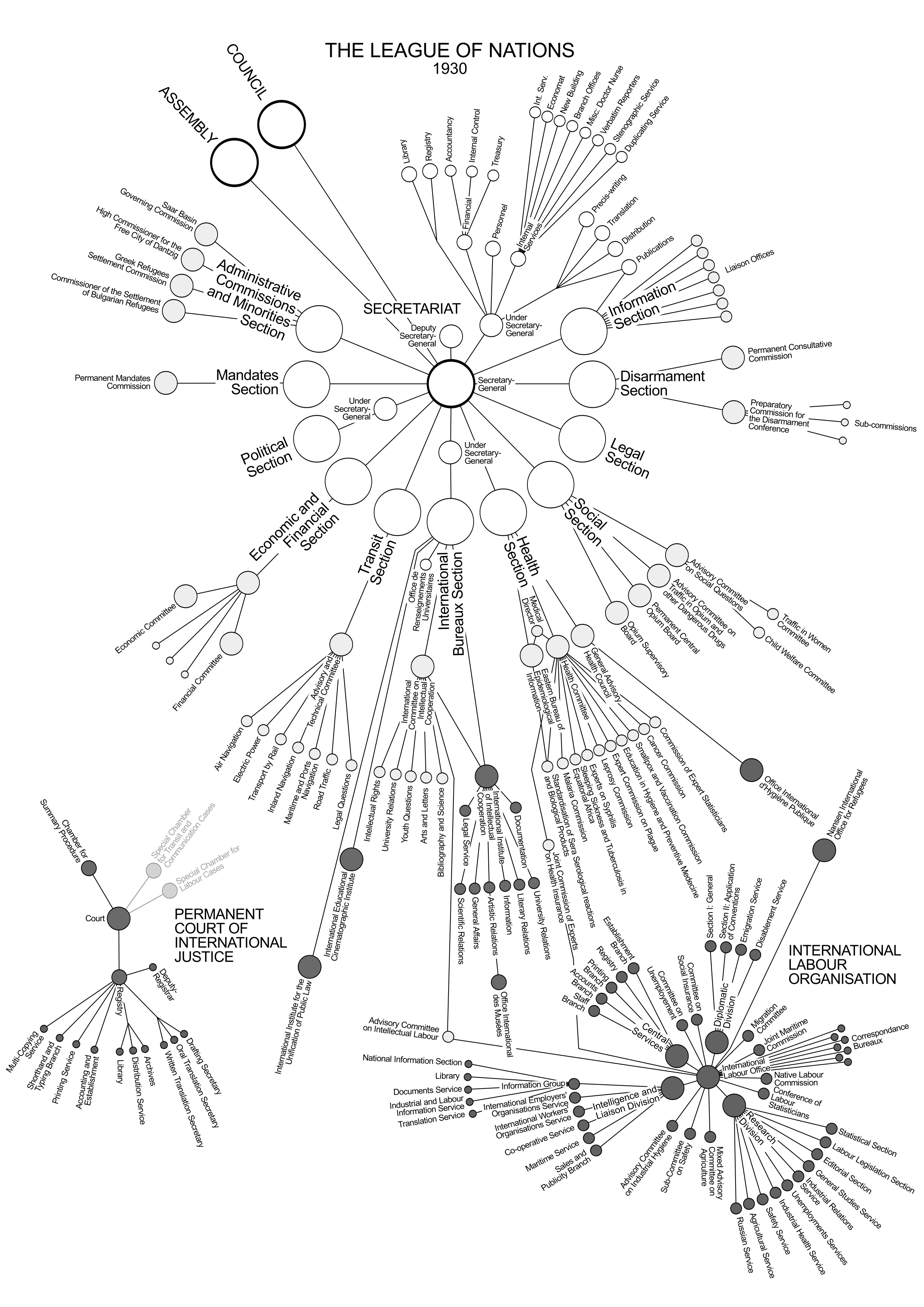
Organisational chart of international organizations as of 1930

== Organisation ==
The OIHP was managed by a "Permanent Committee" chaired successively by Rocco Santoliquido (1908–1919), Oscar Velghe (1919–1932), George S. Buchanan (1932–1936). Important personalities were taking part in the work of the OIHP such as Camille Barrère.

As of 1933, the OIHP was composed of the following contracting parties:

- Argentina, 1910
- Australia, 1909
- Belgian Congo, 1927
- Belgium, 1907
- Bolivia, 1912
- Brazil, 1907
- UK British dominions, 1927
- UK British India, 1908
- Bulgaria, 1909
- Canada, 1910
- Chile, 1912
- Denmark, 1913
- Netherlands (Dutch Indies), 1925
- Egypt, 1907
- France, 1907
- French Algeria, 1910
- French Equatorial Africa, 1929
- French Indochina, 1914
- French West Africa, 1920
- Germany, 1928
- UK (Great Britain), 1907
- Greece, 1913
- Kingdom of Hejaz, 1932
- Ireland (Irish Free State), 1928
- Italy, 1907
- Japan, 1924
- Luxembourg, 1926
- Madagascar, 1920
- Morocco, 1920
- Mexico, 1909
- Monaco, 1913
- Netherlands, 1907
- Norway, 1912
- New Zealand, 1924
- Peru, 1908
- Persia, 1909
- Poland, 1920
- Portugal, 1907
- Romania, 1921
- Sudan, 1926
- Sweden, 1909
- Switzerland
- Czechoslovakia, 1922
- Union of South Africa, 1919
- Spain, 1907
- French protectorate of Tunisia, 1908
- Turkey, 1911
- USA, 1907
- Soviet Union, 1926 (initially accessed as Russian Empire in 1907)
- Uruguay, 1913

== See also ==
- International Sanitary Conferences
- League of Nations
- Hygiene
- Public health
- World Health Organization
- Camille Barrère
- Drug Supervisory Body
