= Pharmacopoeia of the People's Republic of China =

Reference book

The Pharmacopoeia of the People's Republic of China (PPRC) or the Chinese Pharmacopoeia (ChP), compiled by the Pharmacopoeia Commission of the Ministry of Health of the People's Republic of China, is an official compendium of drugs, covering Traditional Chinese and western medicines, which includes information on the standards of purity, description, test, dosage, precaution, storage, and the strength for each drug.

It is recognized by the World Health Organization as the official pharmacopoeia of China.

== Content ==
The ChP, as of its tenth (2015) edition, comes in 4 volumes for both the Chinese and the English versions:

1. Traditional Chinese Medicine, ISBN 978-7-5067-7337-9
2. Chemical Medicine, ISBN 978-7-5067-7343-0
3. Biological Preparations, ISBN 978-7-5067-7336-2
4. General rules and common inactive ingredients, ISBN 978-7-5067-7539-7; new volume

The English version is collectively coded as ISBN 978-7-5067-8929-5. The 2015 ChP requires Good Manufacturing Practices for all ChP-compliant medications and in general uses INN for English names. The Chinese version arranges medicines in ascending stroke order, while the English translations do so in alphabetical order.

== History ==
The 1997 English version consists of two volumes:

1. Volume 1 (Herbal medicine), 1997, ISBN 7-5025-2062-7
2. Volume 2 (Western medicine), 1997, ISBN 7-5025-2063-5

The 1997 Chinese version (in simplified Chinese) also consists of two volumes, but the English and Chinese versions are not direct translations of each other, as they are sorted differently as is in the current edition.

A third volume was added in the 2005 version. The English edition (ISBN 7117069821) describes itself as a "compendium of almost all traditional Chinese medicines and most western medicines and preparations. Information is given for each drug on standards of purity, description, test, dosage, precaution, storage and strength. Key features: A total of 2691 monographs: 992 for traditional Chinese medicines and 1699 for modern western drugs.

"Volume I contains monographs of Chinese material medica and pared slice, vegetable oil/fat and its extract, Chinese traditional patent medicines, single ingredient of Chinese crude drug preparations etc.; Volume II deals with monographs of chemical drugs, antibiotics, biochemical preparations, Radiopharmaceuticals and excipients for pharmaceutical use; Volume III contains biological products."

== See also ==
- British Pharmacopoeia
- Chinese herbology
- Chinese Medical Herbology and Pharmacology
- European Pharmacopoeia
- Pharmacopoeia
- The International Pharmacopoeia
- United States Pharmacopeia
