= Pharmacopoeia =

Standard reference work on pharmaceutial drugs and compound medicines

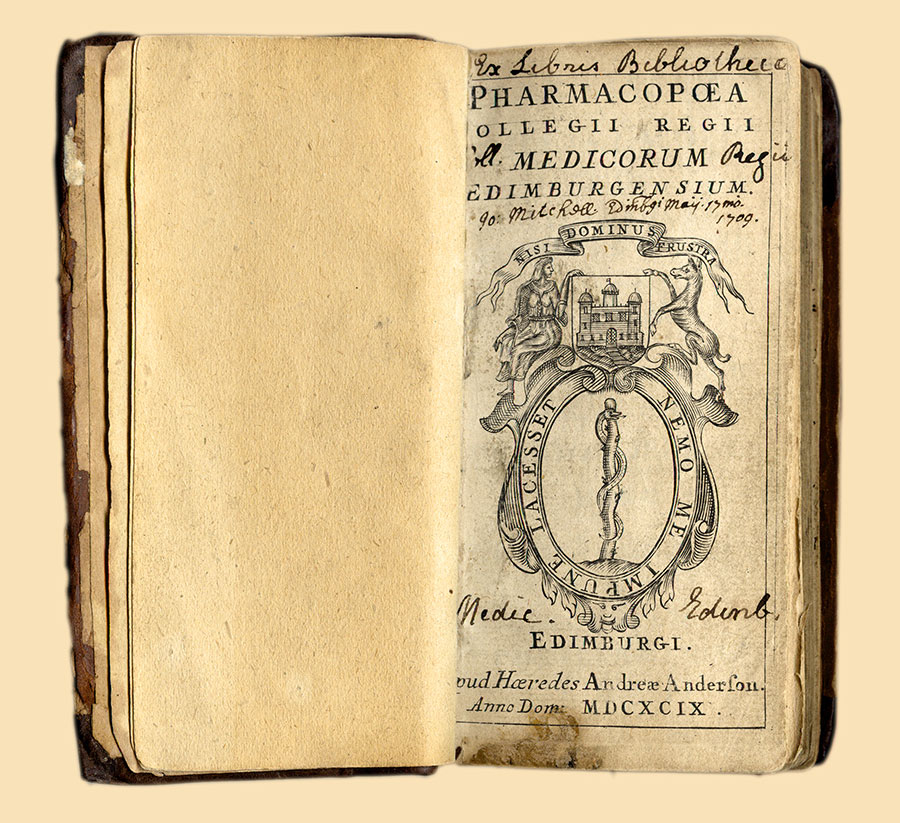
The 1699 Edinburgh Pharmacopoeia

A pharmacopoeia, pharmacopeia, or pharmacopoea (or the typographically obsolete rendering, pharmacopœia), meaning "drug-making", in its modern technical sense, is a reference work containing directions for the identification of compound medicines. These are published or sanctioned by a government or a medical or pharmaceutical society, giving the work legal authority within a specified jurisdiction. In a broader sense it is a collection of pharmaceutical drug specifications. Descriptions of the individual preparations are called monographs.

There are national, supranational, and international pharmacopoeias.

== Etymology ==
The term derives from Ancient Greek: φαρμακοποιία, romanized: pharmakopoiia "making of (healing) medicine, drug-making", a compound of "medicine, drug, poison" (Ancient Greek: φάρμακον, romanized: pharmakon), with the verb "to make" (Ancient Greek: ποιεῖν, romanized: poiein), and the abstract noun suffix -ία -ia. In early modern editions of Latin texts, the Greek diphthong οι (oi) is latinized to its Latin equivalent oe which is in turn written with the ligature œ, giving the spelling pharmacopœia; in modern British English, œ is written as oe, giving the spelling pharmacopoeia, while in American English oe becomes e, resulting in pharmacopeia. The plural form is pharmacopoeiae, pharmacopoeias, or pharmacopeias.

== Early history ==
Although older writings exist which deal with herbal medicine, the major initial work in the field is considered to be the Edwin Smith Papyrus in Egypt, Pliny's pharmacopoeia.

A number of early pharmacopoeia books were written by Persian and Arab physicians. These included The Canon of Medicine of Avicenna in 1025 AD, and works by Ibn Zuhr (Avenzoar) in the 12th century (and printed in 1491), and Ibn Baytar in the 14th century. The Shen-nung pen ts'ao ching (Divine Husbandman's Materia Medica) is the earliest known Chinese pharmacopoeia. The text describes 365 medicines derived from plants, animals, and minerals; according to legend it was written by the Chinese god Shennong. One of the earliest surviving pharmacopoeias from medieval Europe is the Lorsch Pharmacopoeia, which dates to around 800, and draws on classical and post-classical sources.

Pharmacopeial synopsis were recorded in the Timbuktu manuscripts of Mali.

=== China ===
The earliest extant Chinese pharmacopoeia, the Shennong Ben Cao Jing was compiled between 200–250 AD. It contains descriptions of 365 medications.

The earliest known officially sponsored pharmacopoeia was compiled in 659 AD by a team of 23 pharmaceutical scientists led by Su jing during the Tang dynasty (618–907 AD) and was called the Xinxiu bencao (Newly Revised Canon of Material Medical). The work consists of 20 volumes with one dedicated to the table of contents, and 25 volumes of pictures with one volume dedicated to the table of contents. A third part consisting of seven volumes contained illustrated descriptions. The text contains descriptions of 850 medicines with 114 new ones. The work was used throughout China for the next 400 years.

=== City pharmacopoeias ===
A dated work appeared in Nuremberg in 1542; a passing student Valerius Cordus showed a collection of medical prescriptions, which he had selected from the writings of the most eminent medical authorities, to the physicians of the town, who urged him to print it for the benefit of the apothecaries, and obtained the sanction of the senatus for his work. A work known as the Antidotarium Florentinum, was published under the authority of the college of medicine of Florence in the 16th century. In 1511, the Concordie Apothecariorum Barchinone was published by the Society of Apothecaries of Barcelona and kept in the School of Pharmacy of the University of Barcelona.

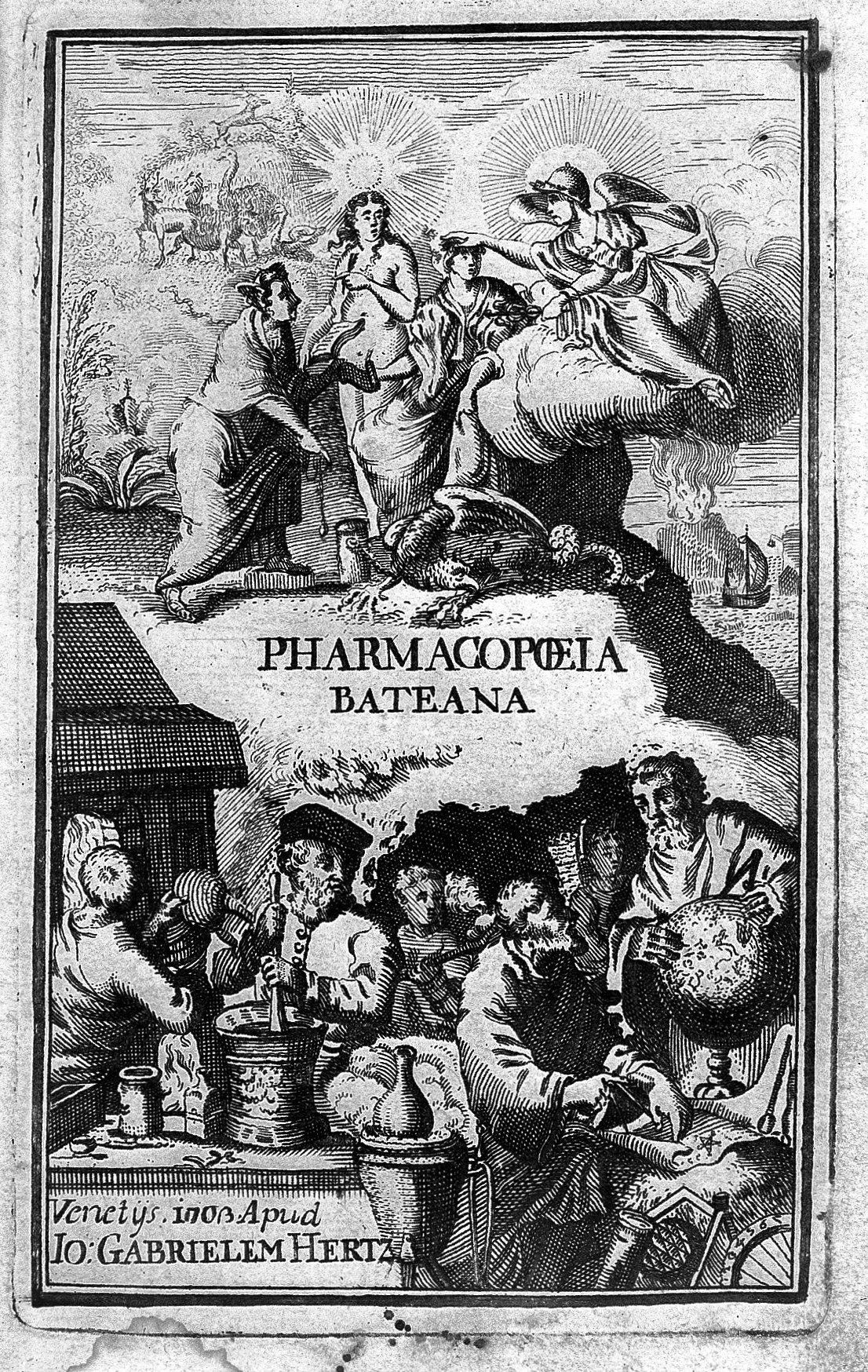
Engraved frontispiece of the 1703 Pharmacopoeia Bateana

The term Pharmacopoeia first appears as a distinct title in a work published at Basel, Switzerland, in 1561 by A. Foes, but does not appear to have come into general use until the beginning of the 17th century.

Before 1542, the works principally used by apothecaries were the treatises on simples (basic medicinal ingredients) by Avicenna and Serapion; the De synonymis and Quid pro quo of Simon Januensis; the Liber servitoris of Bulchasim Ben Aberazerim, which described preparations made from plants, animals, and minerals, and was the type of the chemical portion of modern pharmacopoeias; and the Antidotarium of Nicolaus de Salerno, containing Galenic formulations arranged alphabetically. Of this last work, there were two editions in use — Nicolaus magnus and Nicolaus parvus: in the latter, several of the compounds described in the large edition were omitted and the formulae given on a smaller scale.

Also Vesalius claimed he had written some "dispensariums" and "manuals" on the works of Galenus. Apparently he burnt them. According to recent research communicated at the congresses of the International Society for the History of Medicine by the scholar Francisco Javier González Echeverría, Michel De Villeneuve (Michael Servetus) also published a pharmacopoeia. De Villeneuve, fellow student of Vesalius and the best galenist of Paris according to Johann Winter von Andernach, published the anonymous "Dispensarium or Enquiridion" in 1543, at Lyon, France, with Jean Frellon as editor. This work contains 224 original recipes by De Villeneuve and others by Lespleigney and Chappuis. As usual when it comes to pharmacopoeias, this work was complementary to a previous Materia Medica that De Villeneuve published that same year. This finding was communicated by the same scholar in the International Society for the History of Medicine, with agreement of John M. Riddle, one of the foremost experts on Materia Medica-Dioscorides works.

Nicolaes Tulp, mayor of Amsterdam and respected surgeon general, gathered all of his doctor and chemist friends together and they wrote the first pharmacopoeia of Amsterdam named Pharmacopoea Amstelredamensis in 1636. This was a combined effort to improve public health after an outbreak of the bubonic plague, and also to limit the number of quack apothecary shops in Amsterdam.

==== London, Edinburgh, Dublin ====
Until 1617, such drugs and medicines as were in common use were sold in England by the apothecaries and grocers. In that year the apothecaries obtained a separate charter, and it was enacted that no grocer should keep an apothecary's shop. The preparation of physicians' prescriptions was thus confined to the apothecaries, upon whom pressure was brought to bear to make them dispense accurately, by the issue of a pharmacopoeia in May 1618 by the College of Physicians, and by the power which the wardens of the apothecaries received in common with the censors of the College of Physicians of examining the shops of apothecaries within 7 miles (11 km) of London and destroying all the compounds which they found unfaithfully prepared. This, the first authorized London Pharmacopoeia, was selected chiefly from the works of Mezue and Nicolaus de Salerno, but it was found to be so full of errors that the whole edition was cancelled, and a fresh edition was published in the following December.

At this period the compounds employed in medicine were often heterogeneous mixtures, some of which contained from 20 to 70, or more, ingredients, while a large number of simples were used in consequence of the same substance being supposed to possess different qualities according to the source from which it was derived. Thus crabs' eyes (i.e., gastroliths), pearls, oyster shells, and coral were supposed to have different properties. Among other ingredients entering into some of these formulae were the excrements of human beings, dogs, mice, geese, and other animals, calculi, human skull, and moss growing on it, blind puppies, earthworms, etc.

Although other editions of the London Pharmacopoeia were issued in 1621, 1632, 1639, and 1677, it was not until the edition of 1721, published under the auspices of Sir Hans Sloane, that any important alterations were made. In this issue many of the remedies previously in use were omitted, although a good number were still retained, such as dogs' excrement, earthworms, and moss from the human skull; the botanical names of herbal remedies were for the first time added to the official ones; the simple distilled waters were ordered of a uniform strength; sweetened spirits, cordials and ratafias were omitted as well as several compounds no longer used in London, although still in vogue elsewhere. A great improvement was effected in the edition published in 1746, in which only those preparations were retained which had received the approval of the majority of the pharmacopoeia committee; to these was added a list of those drugs only which were supposed to be the most efficacious. An attempt was made to simplify further the older formulae by the rejection of superfluous ingredients.

In the edition published in 1788 the tendency to simplify was carried out to a much greater extent, and the extremely compound medicines which had formed the principal remedies of physicians for 2,000 years were discarded, while a few powerful drugs which had been considered too dangerous to be included in the Pharmacopoeia of 1765 were restored to their previous position. In 1809 the French chemical nomenclature was adopted, and in 1815 a corrected impression of the same was issued. Subsequent editions were published in 1824, 1836, and 1851.

The first Edinburgh Pharmacopoeia was published in 1699 and the last in 1841; the first Dublin Pharmacopoeia in 1807 and the last in 1850.

== National pharmacopoeiae ==
The first national pharmacopoeia published was the Spanish Pharmacopoeia Matritensi Regii in 1739. It applied to the entire country and all of its foreign possessions, including in America.

=== Emergence in Britain and Ireland ===
The preparations contained in the three city pharmacopoeias of Britain and Ireland – published by the Colleges of Physicians of Edinburgh, London, and Dublin – in use from the 17th to the mid-19th century, were not all uniform in strength. This was a source of much inconvenience and danger to the public, when powerful preparations such as dilute hydrocyanic acid were ordered in the one country and dispensed according to the national pharmacopoeia in another. As a result, the Medical Act 1858 ordained that the General Medical Council should publish a book containing a list of medicines and compounds, to be called the British Pharmacopoeia, which would be a substitute throughout Great Britain and Ireland for the separate pharmacopoeias. Hitherto these had been published in Latin. The first British Pharmacopoeia was published in the English language in 1864, but gave such general dissatisfaction both to the medical profession and to chemists and druggists that the General Medical Council brought out a new and amended edition in 1867. This dissatisfaction was probably owing partly to the fact that the majority of the compilers of the work were not engaged in the practice of pharmacy, and therefore not competent to decide upon the kind of preparations required for the method of their manufacture. The necessity for this element in the construction of a pharmacopoeia is now fully recognized in other countries, in most of which pharmaceutical chemists are represented on the committee for the preparation of the legally recognized manuals.

=== United States ===
In the U.S., the USP-NF (United States Pharmacopeia – National Formulary) has been issued by a private non-profit organization since 1820 under the authority of a convention that meets periodically that is largely constituted by physicians, pharmacists, and other public health professionals, setting standards published in the compendia through various expert committees. In the U.S. when there is an applicable USP-NF quality monograph, drugs and drug ingredients must conform to the compendial requirements (such as for strength, quality or purity) or be deemed adulterated or misbranded under the Federal food and drug laws.

== Supranational and international harmonization ==
=== Internationalization attempts ===
Attempts have been made by international pharmaceutical and medical conferences to settle a basis on which a globally international pharmacopoeia could be prepared, but regulatory complexity and regional variation in conditions of pharmacy are hurdles to fully harmonizing across all countries (that is, defining thousands of details that can all be known to work successfully in all places). In addition, some work still continues today, such as under the banner of the International Council on Harmonisation of Technical Requirements for Registration of Pharmaceuticals for Human Use (ICH), a tri-regional organisation that represents the drug regulatory authorities of the European Union, Japan, and the United States. Representatives from the Pharmacopoeias of these three regions have met twice yearly since 1990 in the Pharmacopoeial Discussion Group to try to work towards "compendial harmonisation". Specific monographs are proposed, and if accepted, proceed through stages of review and consultation leading to adoption of a common monograph that provides a common set of tests and specifications for a specific material.

=== International pharmaceutical congresses (1864–1902) ===
The first international pharmaceutical congress was held in Strasbourg in 1867, and emitted the wish that an international pharmacopoeia be compiled.

=== Brussels Agreements (1902–1951) ===
The Conference for the Unification of the Formulae of Potent Medicaments was held in Brussels in 1902. It was also the 10th pharmacists' congress. It resulted in the 1902 Agreement for the Unification of the Formulae of Potent Medicaments (First pharmacopoeia agreement) although "it took four years of textual adjustments before the Agreement could enter into force as a multilateral treaty in 19 (mostly European) countries, in December 1906"

A second conference met in Brussels' Academy Palace in 1925, resulting in a revised international agreement, the Second Pharmacopoeia Agreement (1925).

=== WHO International Pharmacopoeia (1951–present) ===
The World Health Organization discontinued and replaced the 1925 Brussels Agreement with the International Pharmacopoeia (Ph.Int.), edited since 1951.

It does not replace a national pharmacopoeia but rather provides a model or template for one and also can be invoked by legislation within a country to serve as that country's regulation.

=== The European Pharmacopoeia (1964–present) ===
Countries of the European continent member of the Council of Europe (distinct and broader than the EU) have a supranational pharmacopoeia, the European Pharmacopoeia (Ph.Eur.); it has not replaced the national pharmacopoeias of European member states but rather helps to harmonize them. However, some smaller European countries have stopped to edit their own pharmacopoeia to rely only on Ph.Eur.

=== Soviet Union ===
The Soviet Union had a nominally supranational pharmacopoeia, the State Pharmacopoeia of the Union of Soviet Socialist Republics (USSRP), although the de facto nature of the nationality of republics within that state differed from the de jure nature.

== Medical preparations, uses, and dosages ==
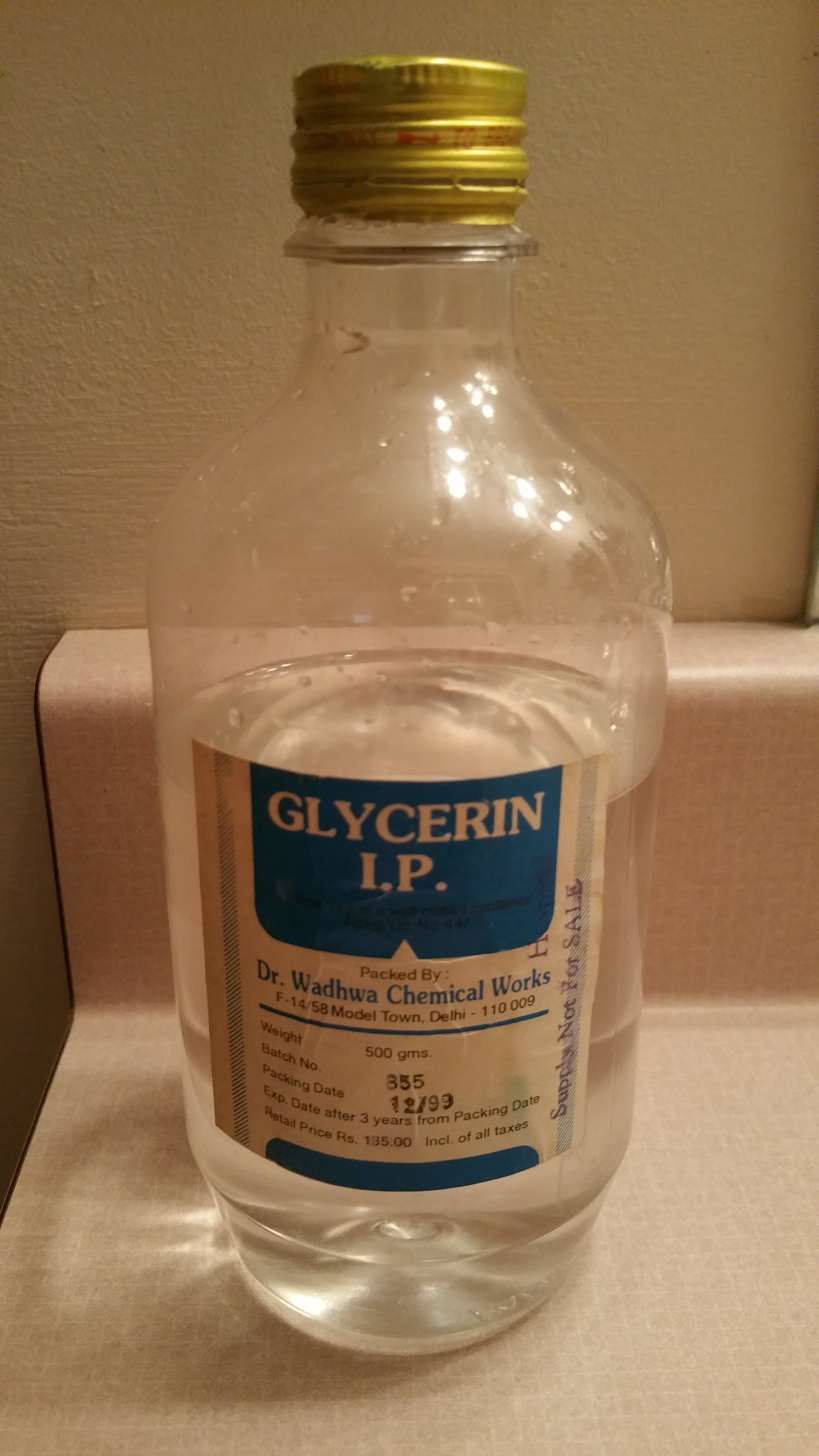
A bottle of glycerin purchased at a pharmacy with the abbreviation I.P. appearing after the product name.

Though formerly printed there has been a transition to a situation where pharmaceutical information is available as printed volumes and on the internet. The rapid increase in knowledge renders necessary frequent new editions, to furnish definite formulae for preparations that have already come into extensive use in medical practice, so as to ensure uniformity of strength, and to give the characters and tests by which their purity and potency may be determined. However each new edition requires several years to carry out numerous experiments for devising suitable formulae, so that current pharmacopoeia are never quite up to date.

This difficulty has hitherto been met by the publication of such non-official formularies as Squire's Companion to the Pharmacopoeia and Martindale: The complete drug reference (formerly Martindale's: the extra pharmacopoeia), in which all new remedies and their preparations, uses and doses are recorded, and in the former the varying strengths of the same preparations in the different pharmacopoeias are also compared (Squire's was incorporated into Martindale in 1952). The need of such works to supplement the Pharmacopoeia is shown by the fact that they are even more largely used than the Pharmacopoeia itself, the first issued in 18 editions and the second in 13 editions at comparatively short intervals. In the UK, the task of elaborating a new Pharmacopoeia is entrusted to a body of a purely medical character, and legally the pharmacist does not, contrary to the practice in other countries, have a voice in the matter. This is notwithstanding the fact that, although the medical practitioner is naturally the best judge of the drug or preparations that will afford the best therapeutic result, they are not as competent as the pharmacist to say how that preparation can be produced in the most effective and satisfactory manner, nor how the purity of drugs can be tested.

The change occurred with the fourth edition of the British Pharmacopoeia in 1898. A committee of the Royal Pharmaceutical Society of Great Britain was appointed at the request of the General Medical Council to advise on pharmaceutical matters. A census of prescriptions was taken to ascertain the relative frequency with which different preparations and drugs were used in prescriptions, and suggestions and criticisms were sought from various medical and pharmaceutical bodies across the British Empire. As regards the purely pharmaceutical part of the work a committee of reference in pharmacy, nominated by the pharmaceutical societies of Great Britain and Ireland (as they were then), was appointed to report to the Pharmacopoeia Committee of the Medical Council.

Some difficulty has arisen since the passing of the Adulteration of Food and Drugs Act concerning the use of the Pharmacopoeia as a legal standard for the drugs and preparations contained in it. The Pharmacopoeia is defined in the preface as only "intended to afford to the members of the medical profession and those engaged in the preparation of medicines throughout the British Empire one uniform standard and guide whereby the nature and composition of, substances to be used in medicine may be ascertained and determined". It cannot be an encyclopaedia of substances used in medicine, and can be used only as a standard for the substances and preparations contained in it, and for no others. It has been held in the Divisional Courts (Dickins v. Randerson) that the Pharmacopoeia is a standard for official preparations asked for under their pharmacopoeial name. But there are many substances in the Pharmacopoeia which are not only employed in medicine, but have other uses, such as sulfur, gum benzoin, tragacanth, gum arabic, ammonium carbonate, beeswax, oil of turpentine, linseed oil, and for these a commercial standard of purity as distinct from a medicinal one is needed, since the preparations used in medicine should be of the highest possible degree of purity obtainable, and this standard would be too high and too expensive for ordinary purposes. The use of trade synonyms in the Pharmacopoeia, such as saltpetre for purified potassium nitrate, and milk of sulfur for precipitated sulfur, is partly answerable for this difficulty, and has proved to be a mistake, since it affords ground for legal prosecution if a chemist sells a drug of ordinary commercial purity for trade purposes, instead of the purified preparation which is official in the Pharmacopoeia for medicinal use. This would not be the case if the trade synonym were omitted. For many drugs and chemicals not in the Pharmacopoeia there is no standard of purity that can be used under the Adulteration of Food and Drugs Act, and for these, as well as for the commercial quality of those drugs and essential oils which are also in the Pharmacopoeia, a legal standard of commercial purity is much needed. This subject formed the basis of discussion at several meetings of the Pharmaceutical Society, and the results have been embodied in a work called Suggested Standards for Foods and Drugs by C. G. Moor, which indicates the average degree of purity of many drugs and chemicals used in the arts, as well as the highest degree of purity obtainable in commerce of those used in medicine.

An important step has also been taken in this direction by the publication under the authority of the Council of the Pharmaceutical Society of Great Britain of the British Pharmaceutical Codex (BPC), in which the characters of and tests for the purity of many unofficial drugs and preparations are given as well as the character of many glandular preparations and antitoxins that have come into use in medicine, but have not yet been introduced into the Pharmacopoeia. This work may also possibly serve as a standard under the Adulteration of Food and Drugs Act for the purity and strength of drugs not included in the Pharmacopoeia and as a standard for the commercial grade of purity of those in the Pharmacopoeia which are used for non-medical purposes.

Another legal difficulty connected with modern pharmacopoeias is the inclusion in some of them of synthetic chemical remedies, the processes for preparing which have been patented, whilst the substances are sold under trade-mark names. The scientific chemical name is often long and unwieldy, and the physician prefers when writing a prescription to use the shorter name under which it is sold by the patentees. In this case the pharmacist is compelled to use the more expensive patented article, which may lead to complaints from the patient. If the physician were to use the same article under its pharmacopoeial name when the patented article is prescribed, they would become open to prosecution by the patentee for infringement of patent rights. Hence the only solution is for the physician to use the chemical name (which cannot be patented) as given in the Pharmacopoeia, or, for those synthetic remedies not included in the Pharmacopoeia, the scientific and chemical name given in the British Pharmaceutical Codex.

== List of national and supranational pharmacopoeias ==
In most of the Neo-Latin names, Pharmacopoea is the more common spelling, although for several of them, Pharmacopoeia is common.

INN system symbol	Other symbols (including older INN system symbol)	English-language title	Latin-language title	Other-language title	Active or retired	Website	Notes
—	—	Brazilian Pharmacopoeia	—	Farmacopeia Brasileira	Active	ANVISA	
BP	Ph.B., Ph.Br.	British Pharmacopoeia	Pharmacopoea Britannica	—	Active	BP	
BPC	—	British Pharmaceutical Codex	—	—	Retired	—	"BPC" also often stands for "British Pharmacopoeia Commission"
ChP	PPRC	Pharmacopoeia of the People's Republic of China (Chinese Pharmacopoeia)	Pharmacopoea Sinensis	中华人民共和国药典	Active	PPRC	
CSL	CSP, Ph.Bs.	Czechoslovak Pharmacopoeia	Pharmacopoea Bohemoslovenica	Československý Lékopis	Retired		
Ph.Boh.		Czech Pharmacopoeia	Pharmacopoea Bohemica	Český Lékopis	Active	Ph.Boh.	
		Slovak Pharmacopoeia	Pharmacopoea Slovaca	Slovenský Liekopis	Active		
Ph.Eur.	EP	European Pharmacopoeia	Pharmacopoea Europaea	—	Active	Ph.Eur.	
Ph.Fr.	—	French Pharmacopoeia	—	Pharmacopée Française	Active	Ph.Fr.	The name Pharmacopoea Gallica (Ph.Gall.) has not been used since the early 20th century
DAB	—	German Pharmacopoeia	—	Deutsches Arzneibuch	Active		The name Pharmacopoea Germanica (Ph.G.) has not been used since the early 20th century
Ph.Hg.	—	Hungarian Pharmacopoeia	Pharmacopoea Hungarica	Magyar gyógyszerkönyv	Active		
IP	INDP, Ph.Ind.	Indian Pharmacopoeia	Pharmacopoea Indica	—	Active	IP	
	FI	Indonesian Pharmacopoeia	Pharmacopoea Indonesia	Farmakope Indonesia	Active	FI	
Ph.Int.	IP, Ph.I.	International Pharmacopoeia	Pharmacopoea Internationalis	—	Active	Ph.Int.	
F.U.	—	Official Pharmacopoeia of the Italian Republic	—	Farmacopea Ufficiale	Active	F.U.	
JP	—	Japanese Pharmacopoeia	Pharmacopoea	日本薬局方	Active	JP	
JRA	—	Minimum Requirements for Antibiotic Products of Japan	—		Active		
FEUM	MXP	Pharmacopoeia of the United Mexican States (Mexican Pharmacopoeia)	—	Farmacopea de los Estados Unidos Mexicanos	Active	FEUM	
FP	—	Portuguese Pharmacopoeia	Pharmacopoea Lusitanica	Farmacopeia Portuguesa	Active	FP	
Ph.Helv.	—	Swiss Pharmacopoeia	Pharmacopoea Helvetica	Schweizerischen Pharmakopöe, Schweizerischen Arzneibuch	Active	Ph.Helv.	
KP		Korean Pharmacopeia	—	대한민국약전	Active	KP / KP	
KHP		Korean Herbal Pharmacopeia	—	대한민국약전외한약(생약)규격집	Active	KHP	
USP	—	United States Pharmacopeia	—	—	Active	USP	
USSRP	—	State Pharmacopoeia of the Union of Soviet Socialist Republics (Soviet Pharmacopoeia)	—		Retired		
SPRF	—	The State Pharmacopoeia of the Russian Federation	—	Государственная Фармакопея Российской Федерации	Active	SPRF	
YP	Ph.Jug.	Yugoslav Pharmacopoeia	Pharmacopoea Jugoslavica		Retired		
RFE	—	Royal Spanish Pharmacopoeia	—	Real Farmacopea Española	Active	RFE	

== See also ==
- Pharmaceutical formulation
- Specification
- Standards organization
- Compounding
- Monograph
- Global health
  - The International Pharmacopoeia
  - World Health Organization
  - International Conference on Harmonisation of Technical Requirements for Registration of Pharmaceuticals for Human Use (ICH)
  - International Pharmaceutical Federation
  - International Plant Names Index

- National pharmacopoeias
  - European Pharmacopoeia
  - United States Pharmacopeia
  - Pharmacopoeia of the People's Republic of China
  - British Pharmacopoeia & National Formulary
  - Japanese Pharmacopoeia
  - Iranian National Formulary
- Informal / popular pharmacopoeial projects:
  - Erowid
  - Hamilton's Pharmacopeia

== Bibliography ==
- Lu, Yongxiang (2015), A History of Chinese Science and Technology 2
- Volckringer, Jean (1953), Évolution et Unification des Formulaires et des Pharmacopées
