= Brussels Agreement =

Brussels Agreement may refer to:

- Brussels Pharmacopoeia Agreement (1902) signed in 1906, replaced by the Brussels Pharmacopoeia Agreement (1925) signed in 1925
- Brussels Agreement (1924), a multilateral treaty providing for the medical treatment of seamen with venereal diseases
- Brussels Agreement (1984), a treaty between Spain and the United Kingdom respecting Gibraltar
- Brussels Agreement (2013), normalising relations between Serbia and Kosovo

== See also ==
- Treaty of Brussels
