= British Pharmacopoeia =

National drug reference book of the United Kingdom

- Headquarters: London, United Kingdom
- Website: www.pharmacopoeia.com

The British Pharmacopoeia (BP) is the national pharmacopoeia of the United Kingdom. It is an annually published collection of quality standards for medicinal substances in the UK, which is used by individuals and organisations involved in pharmaceutical research, development, manufacture and testing.

Pharmacopoeial standards are publicly available and legally enforceable standards of quality for medicinal products and their constituents. The British Pharmacopoeia is an important statutory component in the control of medicines, which complements and assists the licensing and inspection processes of the UK's Medicines and Healthcare products Regulatory Agency (MHRA). Together with the British National Formulary (BNF), the British Pharmacopoeia defines the UK's pharmaceutical standards.

Pharmacopoeial standards are compliance requirements; that is, they provide the means for an independent judgement as to the overall quality of an article, and apply throughout the shelf-life of a product. Inclusion of a substance in a pharmacopoeia does not indicate that it is either safe or effective for the treatment of any disease.

== Legal basis ==
The British Pharmacopoeia is published on behalf of the Health Ministers of the United Kingdom; on the recommendation of the Commission on Human Medicines, in accordance with section 99(6) of the Medicines Act 1968, and notified in draft to the European Commission (EC) in accordance with Directive 98/34/EEC.

The monographs of the European Pharmacopoeia (as amended by Supplements published by the Council of Europe) are reproduced either in the British Pharmacopoeia, or in the associated edition of the British Pharmacopoeia (Veterinary).

In the pharmacopoeia, certain drugs and preparations are included regardless of the existence of actual or potential patent rights. Where substances are protected by letters patent, their inclusion in the pharmacopoeia neither conveys, nor implies, licence to manufacture.

== History ==
The regulation of medicinal products by officials in the United Kingdom dates back to the reign of King Henry VIII (1491–1547). The Royal College of Physicians of London had the power to inspect apothecaries’ products in the London area, and to destroy defective stock. The first list of approved drugs, with information on how they should be prepared, was the London Pharmacopoeia, published in 1618. The first edition of what is now known as the British Pharmacopoeia was published in 1864, and was one of the first attempts to harmonise pharmaceutical standards, through the merger of the London, Edinburgh and Dublin Pharmacopoeias. The Neo-Latin name that had some currency at the time was Pharmacopoeia Britannica (Ph. Br.).

In 1844, concern about the dangers of unregulated manufacture and use led William Flockhart – who had provided chloroform to Doctor (later Sir) James Young Simpson for his experiment on anaesthesia – to recommend the creation of a 'Universal Phamacopoeia for Great Britain' in his inaugural speech as president of the Northern British branch of the Pharmaceutical Society.

A commission was first appointed by the General Medical Council (GMC), when the body was made statutorily responsible under the Medical Act 1858 for producing a British pharmacopoeia on a national basis. In 1907, the British Pharmacopoeia was supplemented by the British Pharmaceutical Codex, which gave information on drugs and other pharmaceutical substances not included in the BP, and provided standards for these.

The Medicines Act 1968 established the legal status of the British Pharmacopoeia Commission, and of the British Pharmacopoeia, as the UK standard for medicinal products under section 4 of the Act. The British Pharmacopoeia Commission continues the work of the earlier Commissions appointed by the GMC, and is responsible for preparing new editions of the British Pharmacopoeia and the British Pharmacopoeia (Veterinary), and for keeping them up to date. Under Section 100 of the Medicines Act, the Commission is also responsible for selecting and devising British Approved Names.

Since its first publication in 1864, the distribution of the British Pharmacopoeia has grown throughout the world and it is now used in over 100 countries. Australia and Canada are two of the countries that have adopted the BP as their national standard; in other countries, such as South Korea, the BP is recognised as an acceptable reference standard.

== Content ==
The current edition of the British Pharmacopoeia comprises six volumes, which contain nearly 3,000 monographs for drug substances, excipients, and formulated preparation, together with supporting general notices, appendices (test methods, reagents etc.), and reference spectra, used in the practice of medicine, all comprehensively indexed and cross-referenced for easy reference. Items used exclusively in veterinary medicine in the UK are included in the BP (Veterinary).

- Volume s I and II
  - Medicinal Substances
- Volume III
  - Formulated Preparations
  - Blood related Preparations
  - Immunological Products
  - Radiopharmaceutical Preparations
  - Surgical Materials
  - Homeopathic Preparations
- Volume IV
  - Appendices
  - Infrared Reference Spectra
  - Index
- Volume V
  - British Pharmacopoeia (Veterinary)
- Volume VI: (CD-ROM version)
  - British Pharmacopoeia
  - British Pharmacopoeia (Veterinary)
  - British Approved Names

The British Pharmacopoeia is available as a six-volume print set, or can be accessed electronically via online or download licences; the electronic products use sophisticated search techniques to locate information quickly. For example, pharmacists referring to a monograph can immediately link to other related substances and appendices referenced in the content by using 130,000+ hypertext links within the text.

== Production ==
The British Pharmacopoeia is prepared by the Pharmacopoeial Secretariat, working in collaboration with the British Pharmacopoeia Laboratory, the British Pharmacopoeia Commission (BPC), and its Expert Advisory Groups (EAG) and Advisory Panels. The development of pharmacopoeial standards receives input from relevant industries, hospitals, academia, professional bodies and governmental sources, both within and outside the UK.

The British Pharmacopoeia Laboratory provides analytical and technical support to the British Pharmacopoeia. Its major functions are:

- Development of new pharmacopoeial monographs: the laboratory undertakes the development and validation of qualitative and quantitative test methods for new BP monograph specifications, and refines and revalidates test methods for existing British Pharmacopoeia monographs.
- British Pharmacopoeia Chemical Reference Substances (BPCRS): the laboratory is responsible for the procurement, establishment, maintenance and sale of BPCRS. The catalogue currently contains nearly 500 BPCRS, which are needed as standards for monograph tests in both the British Pharmacopoeia and the British Pharmacopoeia (Veterinary).

The current edition of the British Pharmacopoeia is available from The Stationery Office Bookshop.

== Guidance ==
Detailed information and guidance on various aspects of current pharmacopoeial policy and practice is provided in supplementary chapters of the British Pharmacopoeia. This includes explanation of the basis of pharmacopoeial specifications, and information on the development of monographs including guidance to manufacturers.

== British Approved Names ==
British Approved Names (BANs) are devised or selected by the British Pharmacopoeia Commission (BPC), and published by the Health Ministers, on the recommendation of the Commission on Human Medicines, to provide a list of names of substances or articles referred to in Section 100 of the Medicines Act 1968. BANs are short, distinctive names for substances, where the systematic chemical or other scientific names are too complex for convenient general use.

As a consequence of Directive 2001/83/EC, as amended, the British Approved Names, since 2002, may be assumed to be the recommended International Non-proprietary Name (rINN), except where otherwise stated. A World Health Organization (WHO) INN identifies a pharmaceutical substance or active pharmaceutical ingredient by a unique name that is globally recognised, and in which no party can claim any proprietary rights. A non-proprietary name is also known as a generic name.

== Related publications ==
There are equivalent pharmacopoeia in many other countries, such as U.S. (the United States Pharmacopoeia), Japan (Japanese Pharmacopoeia), and China (Pharmacopoeia of the People's Republic of China). The World Health Organization maintains The International Pharmacopoeia.

The British National Formulary (BNF) and its related publications contain information on prescribing, indications, side effects and costs of all medication available on the National Health Service.

== See also ==
- European Pharmacopoeia
- Indian Pharmacopoeia
- Japanese Pharmacopoeia
- Pharmacopoeia of the People's Republic of China
- The International Pharmacopoeia
- United States Pharmacopeia
