= Homeopathy Looks at the Horrors of Allopathy =

Painting by Alexander Beideman

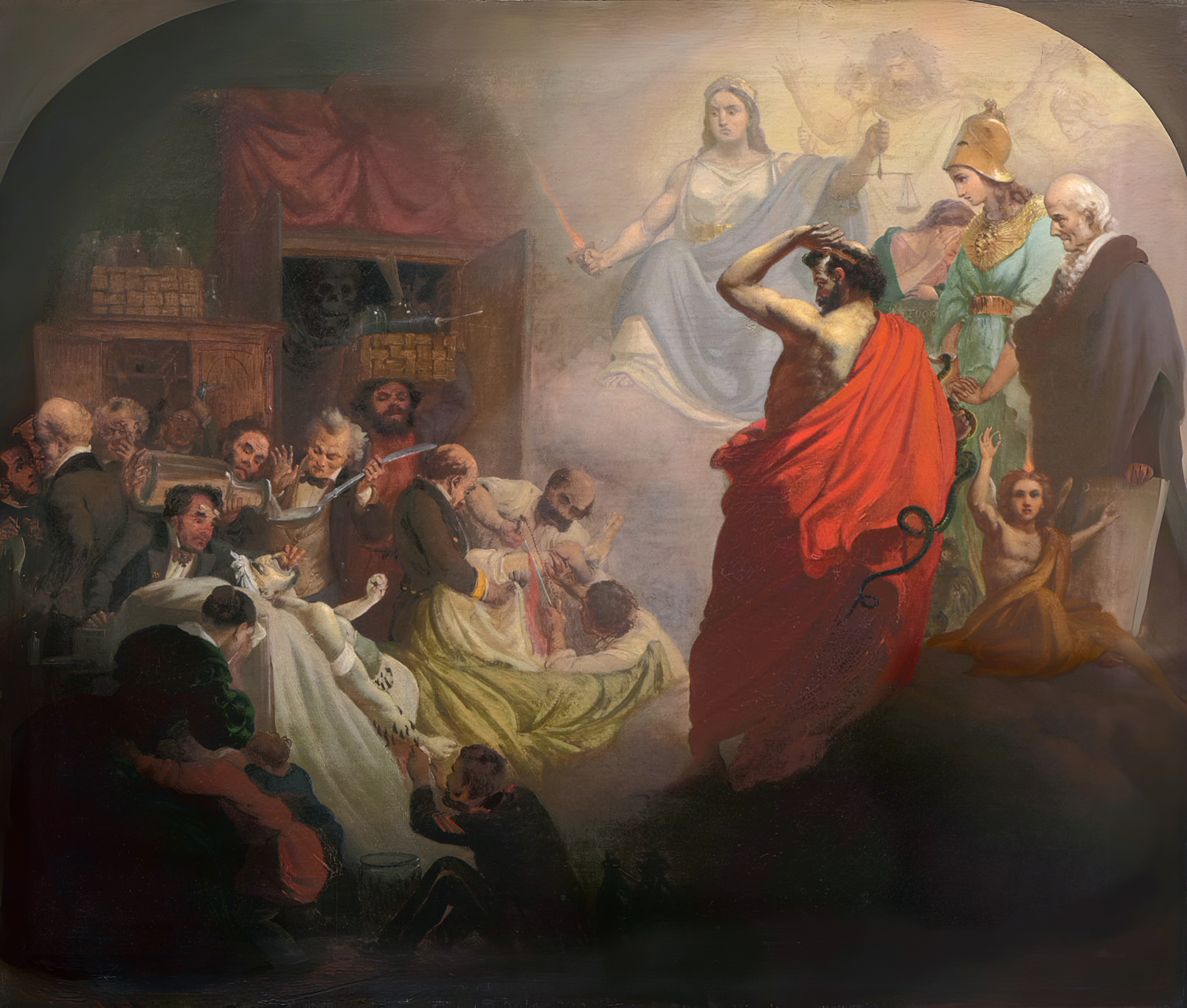
Homeopathy looks at the horrors of Allopathy, by Alexander Beideman (1857)

Homeopathy Looks at the Horrors of Allopathy is an allegorical painting by Russian artist Alexander Beideman, painted in 1857. It is owned by the Tretyakov Gallery in Moscow, Russia. The picture measures 65.5 × 77.3 cm. and has the accession number 1795. In the 19th century, the painting was also known as Triumph of Homeopathy.

== History ==
The allegorical image Homeopathy Looks at the Horrors of Allopathy was painted by Alexander Beideman in Munich in 1857. According to the homeopath Nicholas Gabrilovich (1865–1941), the painting was commissioned by his father, Eugene Gabrilovich (1835–1918), who at that time studied at the Ludwig-Maximilians-Universität München. The canvas was acquired by Pavel Tretyakov before 1893. In 1923, the picture was exhibited at the Tretyakov Gallery at an exhibition dedicated to the 25th anniversary of the death of Pavel Tretyakov. There is also an unfinished variant of the painting, which until the early 1970s was in possession of the widow of Nicholas Gabrilovich, Larisa Maslova-Gabrilovich (1894–1985), and then was sold to a private collection in Kemerovo. In November 2015, the Engineering Building of the State Tretyakov Gallery organized an exhibition of the painting in conjunction with the conference "Art in homeopathy and homeopathy in art".

== Description ==
The "positive extreme of the scene" is located in the right part of the painting. In the background, an allegorical depiction of Homeopathy soars in the clouds. In front of her is the god of medicine Aesculapius in a red cloak, his left hand raised in anger and indignation. Behind him is the goddess Athena, who protects the sciences. At the right edge of the canvas is the German physician Samuel Hahnemann, the founder of homeopathy. All of them look with disapproval and indignation at those associated with allopathy (modern medicine) in the "negative extreme", located on the left side of the painting, where doctors mistreat a patient. One doctor saws off the leg of a patient while the patient's wife and children sob in the lower left corner, the figure of Death waiting in the doorway.

The picture reflects the status homeopathy had in the nineteenth century, when it claimed to be more scientific than the extremely dogmatic "heroic medicine" of the period, which frequently did more harm than good, whereas, in the words of Ben Goldacre, homeopathy "at least did nothing either way". Accordingly, the painting depicts conventional medicine as rogues and charlatans.
