= Heroic medicine =

Outdated model of medicine

Heroic medicine can either refer to heroic therapy or to heroic drugs.

Heroic therapy, also referred to as heroic depletion theory, was a therapeutic method advocating for rigorous treatment of bloodletting, purging, and sweating to shock the body back to health after an illness caused by a humoral imbalance. Rising to the front of orthodox medical practice in North America in the "Age of Heroic Medicine" (1780–1850), it fell out of favor in the mid-19th century as gentler treatments were shown to be more effective and the idea of palliative treatment began to develop.

Heroic drugs, also called in English potent medicaments, was also a term used in Europe from the 18th to the 20th century to refer to certain potent pharmaceutical drugs.

== Heroic therapy ==
Pockets of medical methodology that can be classified as "heroic" appear in the early 17th century with Parisian physician Guy Patin and French anatomist Jean Riolan the Younger. Patin, nicknamed "Le Grand Saigneur" (the Grand Bloodletter), was infamous for his rigorous procedure plans, which included intensive courses of bloodletting and application of senna. Because heroic medicine used popular techniques, it is difficult to absolutely classify a healer's therapeutic epistemology as heroic. Intensive bloodletting treatments can be identified throughout American history, with William Douglass in Massachusetts advocating for a heroic treatment plan in the early 18th century. While there were practitioners here and there who were particularly eager to perform aggressive treatment, heroic medicine did not become a concentrated school of thought until later in the 18th century.

Historian Robert Sullivan reminded that "heroic therapy is not a concept about which historians are unified, whether discussing its definition or its duration."

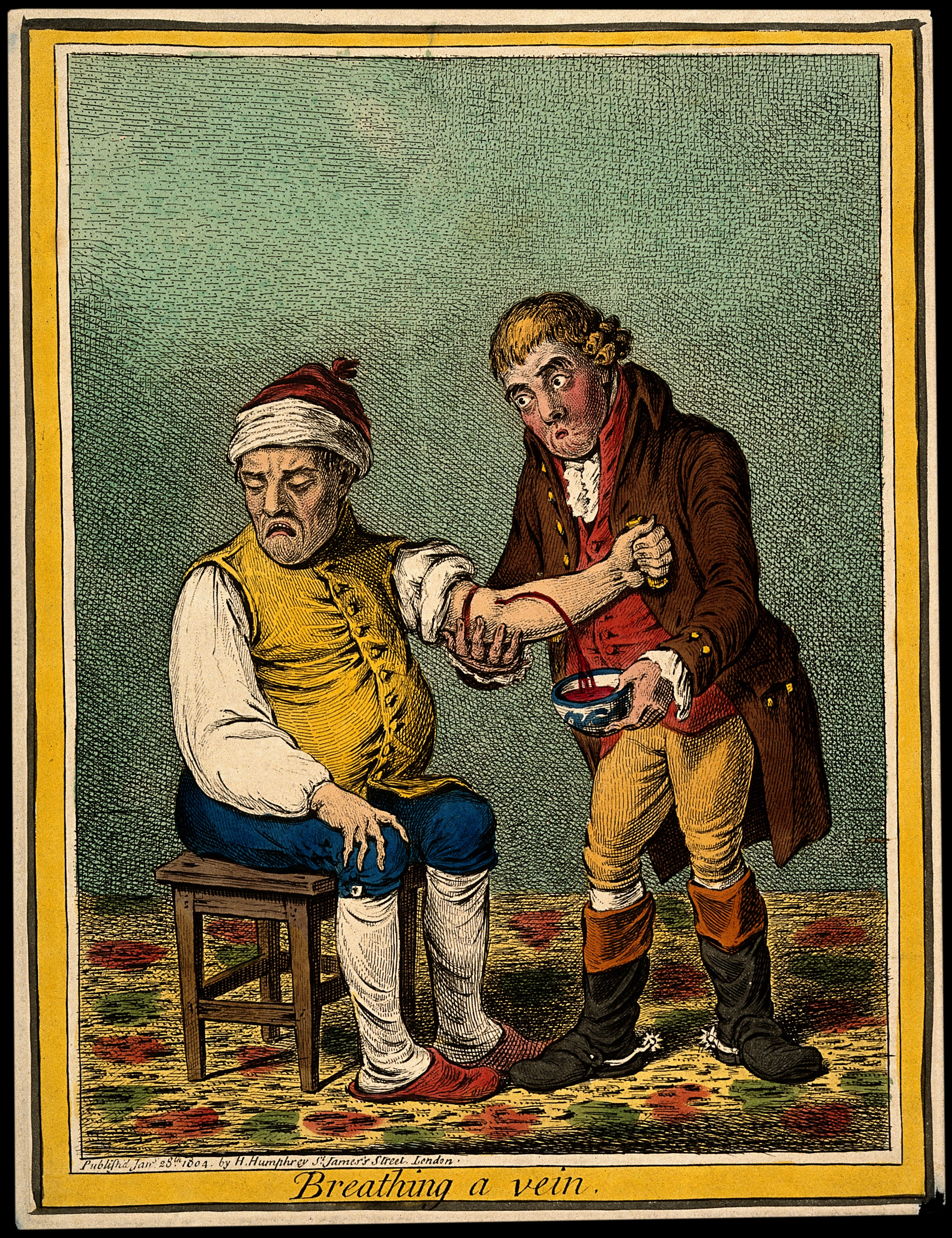
Breathing a Vein, a caricature of bloodletting by venesection by James Gillray, 1804

=== United States ===
Many associate Benjamin Rush with an abrupt acceptance of heroic techniques into the realm of mainstream medicine, especially in America. Founding father, creator of University of Pennsylvania's medical school, and known as the "American Hippocrates," Rush was well respected and revered in the medical field. The Philadelphia Yellow Fever outbreak in 1793 is looked upon as a major event in the merging of heroic medicine into the course of best practices in the medical profession. Much of the city was left incapacitated by the rampant epidemic. As healers fled the city, Rush bravely remained to treat people, and ultimately himself, with drastic regimens of intensive bloodlettings and purgatives. He taught many students who then carried the tradition to other parts of the United States. Varied in its influence, heroic medicine was particularly concentrated around Pennsylvania and spread into other locations. The term "heroic medicine" was coined later in the mid-19th century to describe extreme treatment.

Heroic medicine was used to treat George Washington on his deathbed in 1799. He was bled repeatedly and given Mercury(I) chloride (calomel) and several blisters of cantharidin to induce sweating. Washington died shortly afterward.

Heroic medicine was very much in the hands of the professional, as the invasive interventions involved were beyond the capabilities of rustic practitioners. Symptoms were not regarded as the body's attempt to fight the disease, but were considered a complication that would exacerbate the patient's condition and do further harm. Practitioners believed that a fever should be suppressed and any drugs used should be powerful and given in large dosages. Under this onslaught, domestic medicine dwindled in importance; even treatments that had been found effective in the past were relegated to the realms of old-fashioned folk medicine.

=== Clinical practices ===
Heroic medicine does not have a definitive start date, as its treatments themselves were not new to the field of medicine. Bloodletting, purging, and sweating are cemented firmly in medical tradition back to the advent of humoral theory in the time of Hippocrates and Galen. With hopes of rebalancing the body's delicate homeostasis of four humors – black bile, yellow bile, phlegm, and blood – the careful manipulation of bodily discharge, like bleeding and evacuation, was believed to nudge the body back to its healthy, natural state. The physician's role was always to monitor the path of the body's humoral levels back to normal.

Heroic medicine takes this methodology to the extreme, draining significant volumes of blood and ordering intensive regimens of evacuation. It was not uncommon for physicians to strive to drain up to 80 percent of a patient's blood volume. Likewise, dramatic evacuations, both by pharmacological emetics and laxatives, induced the forceful removal of bodily fluid. Commonly used emetics include senna and tartar emetic. General intestinal cleansing was instigated by massive doses of calomel, to the point of acute mercury poisoning. Sweating was also induced using blisters of cantharidin and diaphoretic.

=== Fall of heroic medicine ===
Heroic medicine became less favored with the advent of medical science. Even during its heyday, heroic medicine faced criticism from physicians and alternative medicine healers like the homeopaths, who pushed for more natural cures. In the modern day, there are few proponents of heroic medicine.

== Heroic drugs ==
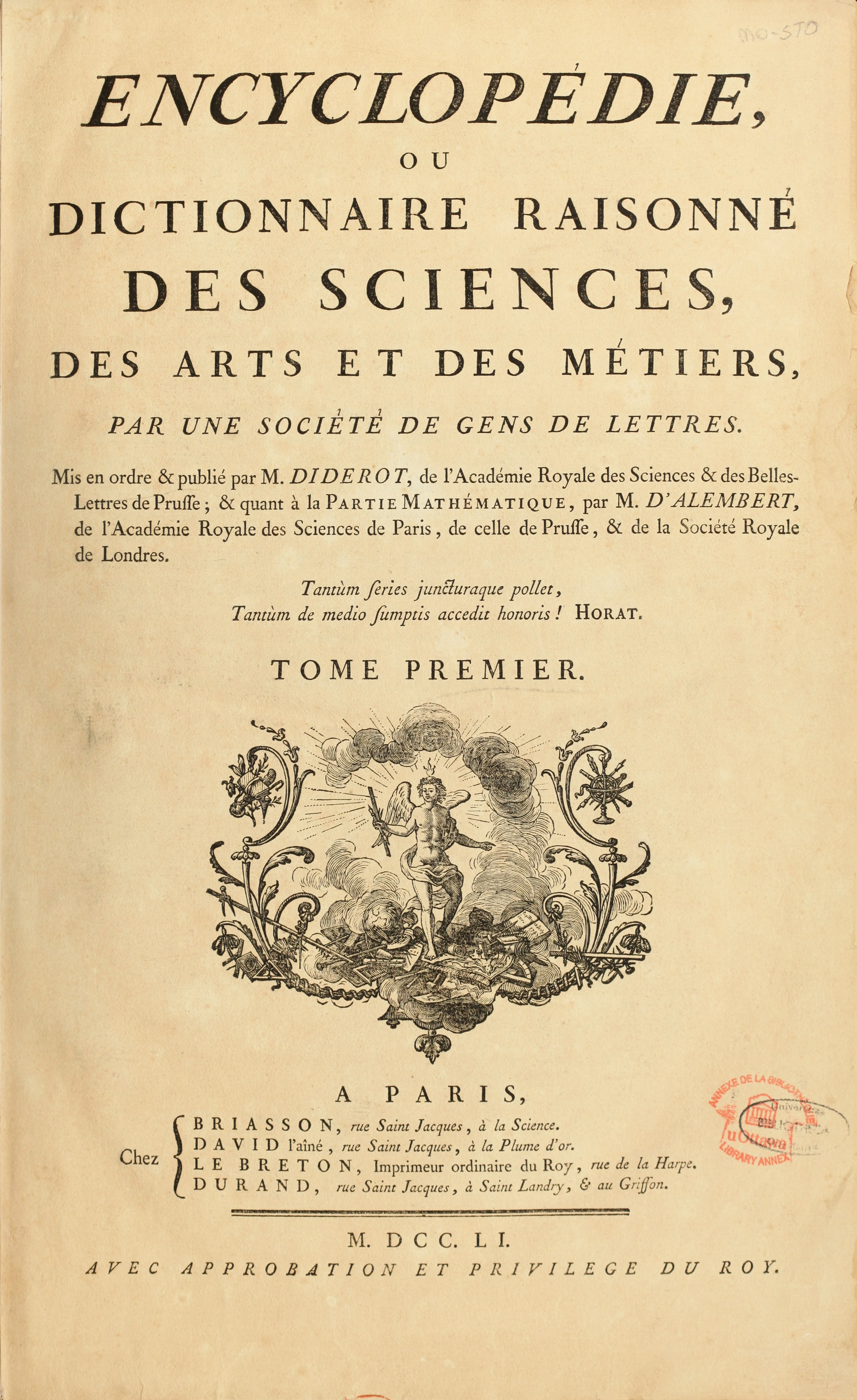
The title page of Diderot's Encyclopedia

Heroic remedies, according to Diderot's Encyclopedia (1765), can be defined as a type of remedy or treatment administered with the intent of causing quick and significant changes to the patient's physiology. These remedies aimed to treat serious conditions by forcefully influencing the body's natural processes. Types of heroic remedies included purging, bloodletting, using strong medications, and physical interventions. The goal of these treatments was to rapidly alter the body's condition and restore it to a healthier state.

This term would continue to be used in the field of pharmacy, sometimes translated as "potent" in English. It may have influenced the name given to Heroin upon its discovery.

In 1902 and 1925, two treaties standardized the monographs of certain heroic medicines, as a first step towards the standardization of more types of drugs (which became eventually The International Pharmacopoeia).

== See also ==
- Heroic measure
- Brussels Pharmacopoeia Agreement (1902)
- Brussels Pharmacopoeia Agreement (1925)
