= Indian Pharmacopoeia Commission =

Indian government agency

- Formation: 1956
- Headquarters: Ghaziabad, Uttar Pradesh, India
- Chairman: P. K. Pradhan, Secretary (Health & Family Welfare), Gov of India.
- Website: ipc.gov.in

Indian Pharmacopoeia Commission (IPC) is an autonomous institution of the Ministry of Health and Family Welfare which sets standards for all drugs that are manufactured, sold and consumed in India. The set of standards are published under the title Indian Pharmacopoeia (IP) which has been modeled on and historically follows from the British Pharmacopoeia. The standards that are in effect since 1 December 2010, are the Indian Pharmacopoeia 2010 (IP 2010). The Pharmacopoeia 2014 was released by Health Minister Ghulam Nabi Azad on 4 November 2013. The Pharmacopoeia 2018 was released by Secretary, Ministry of Health & Family Welfare, Government of India.

I.P., the abbreviation of 'Indian Pharmacopoeia' is familiar to the consumers in the Indian sub-continent as a mandatory drug name suffix. Drugs manufactured in India have to be labelled with the mandatory non-proprietary drug name with the suffix I.P. This is similar to the B.P. suffix for the British Pharmacopoeia and the U.S.P. suffix for the United States Pharmacopeia.

The IPC was formed according to the Indian Drugs and Cosmetics Act of 1940 and established by executive orders of the Government of India in 1956.

== History of publication ==
The actual process of publishing the first Pharmacopoeia started in the year 1944 under the chairmanship of Col. R. N. Chopra. The I. P. list was first published in the year 1946 and was put forth for approval. The titles are suffixed with the respective years of publication, e.g., IP 1996. The following table describes the publication history of the Indian Pharmacopoeia.

Edition	Year	Volumes	Addendum/Supplement
1st Edition	1955	–	Supplement 1960
2nd Edition	1966	–	Supplement 1975
3rd Edition	1985	2	Addendum 1989
3rd Edition	1985	2	Addendum 1991
4th Edition	1996	2	Addendum 2000
4th Edition	1996	2	Vet Supplement 2000
4th Edition	1996	2	Addendum 2002
4th Edition	1996	2	Addendum 2005
5th Edition	2007	3	Addendum 2008
6th Edition	2010	3	Addendum 2012
7th Edition	2014	4	Addendum 2015
7th Edition	2014	4	Addendum 2016
8th Edition	2018	4	Addendum 2019
8th Edition	2018	4	Addendum 2021
9th edition	2022	4	
10th edition	2026	4	

== See also ==
- Pharmacopoeia
