= Allopathic medicine =

Term for science-based, modern medicine

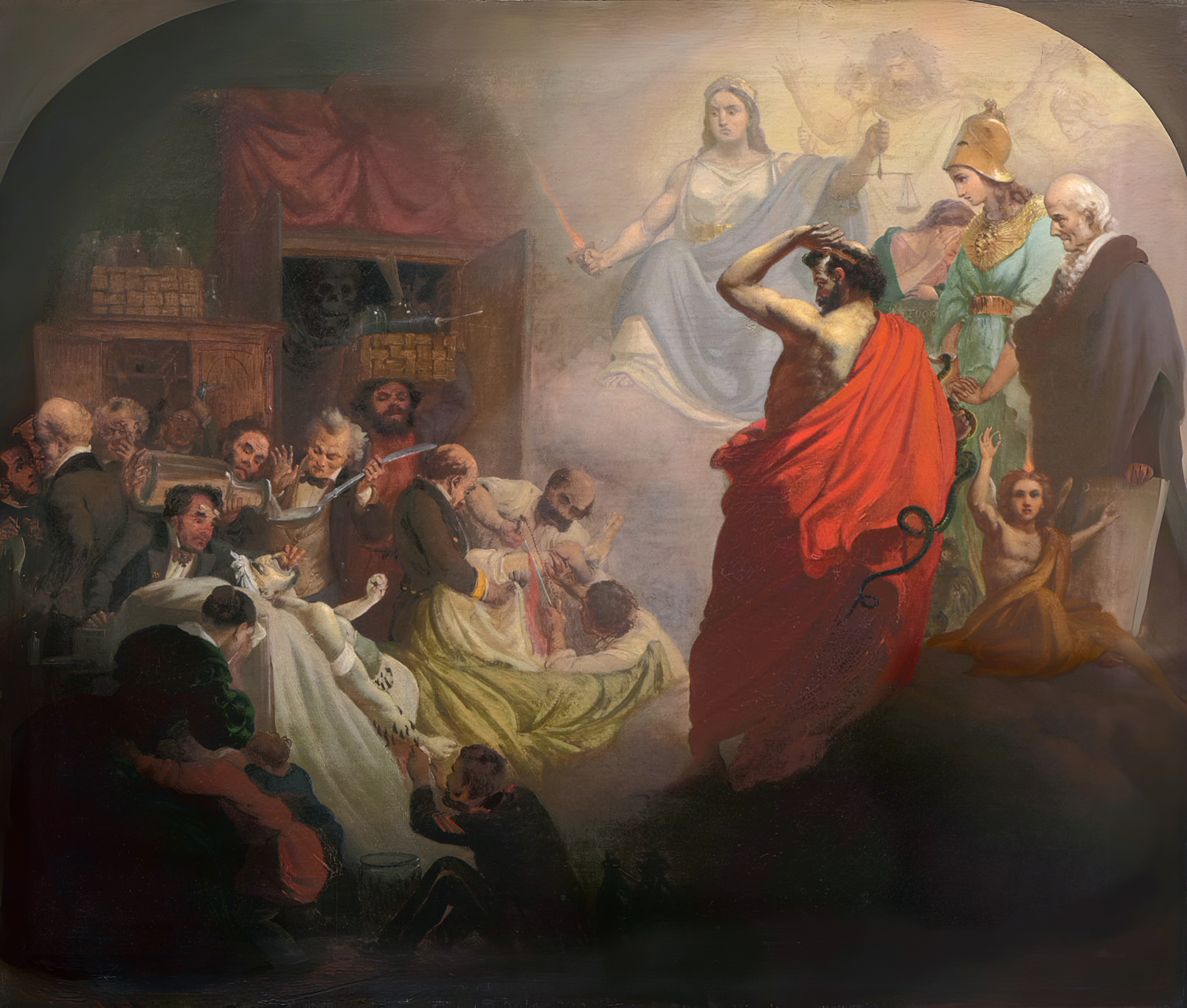
Homeopathy Looks at the Horrors of Allopathy, by Alexander Beideman (1857)

Allopathic medicine, or allopathy, from Ancient Greek ἄλλος (állos), meaning "other", and πάθος (páthos), meaning "pain", is a label originally used derogatorily by 19th-century homeopaths to describe heroic medicine. In its current usage, the term generally refers to contemporary conventional medicine. However, there are regional variations in usage of the term. For example, in the United States the term is primarily used in contrast with osteopathic medicine, especially in the field of medical education; whereas in India the term is used to distinguish modern medicine from Siddha medicine, Ayurveda, homeopathy, Unani and other alternative and traditional medicine traditions, especially when comparing treatments and drugs.

The terms were coined in 1810 by the creator of homeopathy, Samuel Hahnemann. Heroic medicine was the conventional European medicine of the time and did not rely on evidence of effectiveness. It was based on the belief that disease is caused by an imbalance of the four "humours" (blood, phlegm, yellow bile, and black bile) and sought to treat disease symptoms by correcting that imbalance, using "harsh and abusive" methods to induce symptoms seen as opposite to those of diseases rather than treating their underlying causes: disease was caused by an excess of one humour and thus would be treated with its "opposite".

A study released by the World Health Organization (WHO) in 2001 defined allopathic medicine as "the broad category of medical practice that is sometimes called Western medicine, biomedicine, evidence-based medicine, or modern medicine." The WHO used the term in a global study in order to differentiate Western medicine from traditional and alternative medicine, noting that in certain areas of the world "the legal standing of practitioners is equivalent to that of allopathic medicine" where practitioners can be separately certified in complementary/alternative medicine and Western medicine.

The term allopathy was also used to describe anything that was not homeopathy. Kimball Atwood, an American medical researcher and alternative medicine critic, said the meaning implied by the label of allopathy has never been accepted by conventional medicine and is still considered pejorative. American health advocate and sceptic William T. Jarvis, stated that "although many modern therapies can be construed to conform to an allopathic rationale (e.g., using a laxative to relieve constipation), standard medicine has never paid allegiance to an allopathic principle" and that the label "allopath" was "considered highly derisive by regular medicine." Most modern science-based medical treatments (antibiotics, vaccines, and chemotherapeutics, for example) do not fit Hahnemann's definition of allopathy, as they seek to prevent illness or to alleviate an illness by eliminating its cause.

== History ==
The practice of medicine in both Europe and North America during the early 19th century is sometimes referred to as heroic medicine because of the extreme measures (such as bloodletting) sometimes employed in an effort to treat diseases. The term allopath was used by Hahnemann and other early homeopaths to highlight the difference they perceived between homeopathy and the "conventional" heroic medicine of their time. With the term allopathy (meaning "other than the disease"), Hahnemann intended to point out how physicians with conventional training employed therapeutic approaches that, in his view, merely treated symptoms and failed to address the disharmony produced by underlying disease. Homeopaths saw such symptomatic treatments as "opposites treating opposites" and believed these methods were harmful to patients.

Practitioners of alternative medicine have used the term "allopathic medicine" to refer to the practice of conventional medicine in both Europe and the United States since the 19th century. In that century, the term allopath was used most often as a derogatory name for the practitioners of heroic medicine, a precursor to modern medicine that itself did not rely on evidence of effectiveness.

James Whorton discusses this historical pejorative usage:

One form of verbal warfare used in retaliation by irregulars was the word "allopathy". ..."Allopathy" and "allopathic" were liberally employed as pejoratives by all irregular physicians of the nineteenth century, and the terms were considered highly offensive by those at whom they were directed. The generally uncomplaining acceptance of [the term] "allopathic medicine" by today's physicians is an indication of both a lack of awareness of the term's historical use and the recent thawing of relations between irregulars and allopaths.

The controversy surrounding the term can be traced to its original usage during a heated 19th-century debate between practitioners of homeopathy and those they derisively referred to as "allopaths."

Hahnemann used "allopathy" to refer to what he saw as a system of medicine that combats disease by using remedies that produce effects in a healthy subject that are different (hence the Greek root allo- "different") from the effects produced by the disease to be treated. The distinction comes from the use in homeopathy of substances that are meant to cause similar effects as the symptoms of a disease to treat patients (homeo - meaning "similar").

As used by homeopaths, the term allopathy has always referred to the principle of treating disease by administering substances that produce other symptoms (when given to a healthy human) than the symptoms produced by a disease. For example, part of an allopathic treatment for fever may include the use of a drug which reduces the fever, while also including a drug (such as an antibiotic) that attacks the cause of the fever (such as a bacterial infection). A homeopathic treatment for fever, by contrast, is one that uses a diluted dosage of a substance that in an undiluted form would induce fever in a healthy person. These preparations are typically diluted so heavily that they no longer contain any actual molecules of the original substance. Hahnemann used this term to distinguish medicine as practiced in his time from his use of infinitesimally small (or nonexistent) doses of substances to treat the spiritual causes of illness.

The Companion Encyclopedia of the History of Medicine states that "[Hahnemann] gave an all-embracing name to regular practice, calling it 'allopathy'. This term, however imprecise, was employed by his followers and other unorthodox movements to identify the prevailing methods as constituting nothing more than a competing 'school' of medicine, however dominant in terms of number of practitioner proponents and patients".

Contrary to the present usage, Hahnemann reserved the term "allopathic medicine" to the practice of treating diseases by means of drugs inducing symptoms unrelated (i.e., neither similar nor opposite) to those of the disease. He called the practice of treating diseases by means of drugs producing symptoms opposite to those of the patient "enantiopathic" (from the Greek ἐνάντιος (enántios), meaning "opposite") or "antipathic medicine".

== Current usage ==
In the United States, the term is used in the modern era to differentiate between two types of US medical schools (both of which teach aspects of science-based medicine and neither of which teach homeopathy): Allopathic (granting the MD degree) and Osteopathic (granting the DO degree).

In India the term is used principally to distinguish "Western medicine" from Ayurveda, especially when comparing treatments and drugs.

A study released by the World Health Organization (WHO) in 2001 defined "allopathic medicine" as "the broad category of medical practice that is sometimes called Western medicine, biomedicine, evidence-based medicine, or modern medicine." The WHO used the term in a global study in order to differentiate Western medicine from traditional medicine, and from complementary/alternative medicine, noting that in certain areas of the world “the legal standing of practitioners is equivalent to that of allopathic medicine” where practitioners are certified in both complementary/alternative medicine and Western medicine.

As of 2004, use of the term remained common among homeopaths and had spread to other alternative medicine practices. Kimball Atwood, an American medical researcher and alternative medicine critic, said the meaning implied by the label of allopathy has never been accepted by conventional medicine and is still considered pejorative by some. American health educator and skeptic William T. Jarvis, stated in 2008 that "although many modern therapies can be construed to conform to an allopathic rationale (e.g., using a laxative to relieve constipation), standard medicine has never paid allegiance to an allopathic principle" and that the label "allopath" was "considered highly derisive by regular medicine".

Most modern science-based medical treatments (antibiotics, vaccines, and chemotherapeutics, for example) do not fit Samuel Hahnemann's definition of allopathy, as they seek to prevent illness, or remove the cause of an illness by acting on the cause of disease.

== See also ==
- Conservation medicine
- Ethnomedicine
- Evidence-based medicine
