= Bioquell =

UK filter company

Bioquell Limited
- Company type: Private Limited Company
- Headquarters: United Kingdom
- Products: Infection control, bioburden control, and environmental filtration technology.
- Website: www.bioquell.com

Bioquell Limited is a United Kingdom-based manufacturer of infection control, bioburden control and environmental filtration technology. The company was listed on the FTSE Fledgling Index of the London Stock Exchange under the ticker BQE in the medical equipment sector.

The company delisted from the London Stock Exchange in October 2019.
