= Bioburden =

Number of bacteria living on a surface that has not been sterilized

Bioburden is normally defined as the number of bacteria living on a surface that has not been sterilized.

The term is most often used in the context of bioburden testing, also known as microbial limit testing, which is performed on pharmaceutical products and medical products for quality control purposes. Products or components used in the pharmaceutical or medical field require control of microbial levels during processing and handling. Bioburden or microbial limit testing on these products proves that these requirements have been met. Bioburden testing for medical devices made or used in the USA is governed by Title 21 of the Code of Federal Regulations and worldwide by ISO 11737.

The aim of bioburden testing is to measure the total number of viable micro-organisms (total microbial count) on a medical device prior to its final sterilization before implantation or use.

21 C.F.R. 211.110 (a)(6) states that bioburden in-process testing must be conducted pursuant to written procedures during the manufacturing process of drug products. The United States Pharmacopeia (USP) outlines several tests that can be done to quantitatively determine the bioburden of non-sterile drug products.

It is important when conducting these tests to ensure that the testing method does not either introduce bacteria into the test sample or kill bacteria in the test sample. To prepare drug products for testing, they must be dissolved in certain substances based on their "physical characteristics." For example, a water-soluble drug product should be dissolved in "Buffered Sodium Chloride-Peptone Solution pH 7.0, Phosphate Buffer Solution pH 7.2, or Soybean-Casein Digest Broth."

The Membrane-Filtration Method and Plate Count Method can be used to measure the number of microbes in a sample. In the Membrane-Filtration Method, the sample is passed through a membrane filter with a pore size of 0.45 micrometers or less. The membrane filter is then placed onto Soybean-Casein Digest Agar and incubated in order to be able to determine the total aerobic microbial count (TAMC).

In the Plate Count Method, the sample of drug product to be tested and Soybean-Casein Digest Broth is poured into a Petri dish. The Petri dish is then incubated. The most probable number method (MPN) can also be performed for products considered to have a low bioburden. The MPN is considered to be one of the least accurate tests.

The bioburden quantification is expressed in colony forming unit (CFU). There are generally established guidelines for the maximum CFU that a drug product can contain. Contact plates or sterile swabs can also be used to test for microbes on a surface when compounding sterile products to ensure compliance with USP 797.

As an alternative to traditional methods (membrane-filtration and plate count method) there are rapid microbiological methods (RMM) that correlate to plate counting and give results in less time (minutes or hours instead of days). Soleil by Sievers is an example of a RMM that gives results in 45 minutes and detects biotics/ml thanks to flow cytometry.

Bioburden is also associated with biofouling, where microbes collect on the surface of a device or inside of fan cooled equipment. In healthcare settings, this increases the risk of Healthcare-associated infections (HAIs) or Hospital-acquired infection as pathogens can be spread through contact or through the air to new patients and hospital staff. Fan cooled system are generally avoided in critical care and operating rooms, thus relying on natural convection or liquid cooling to cool devices and equipment. Clean rooms (surgical operating rooms, for example) are also required to maintain positive air pressure so that air may leave those rooms, but contaminated air cannot enter from adjacent spaces. HEPA filters are also used to collect airborne pathogens larger than 0.3 microns.
