= Brussels (disambiguation) =

Brussels, officially the Brussels-Capital Region, is a region of Belgium.

Brussels may also refer to:

== Places ==
=== Belgium ===
- City of Brussels, in the Brussels-Capital Region, and the de jure capital of Belgium
- Arrondissement of Brussels, until 1963
- Brussels (Chamber of Representatives constituency)
- Brussels (Flemish Parliament constituency)

=== Canada ===
- Brussels, Ontario
- Bruxelles, Manitoba

=== United States ===
- Brussels, Illinois
- Brussells, Missouri
- Brussels, Wisconsin, a town
- Brussels (community), Wisconsin, an unincorporated community

== Other uses ==
- Brussels sprout, a green, leafy vegetable
- Brussels Airlines, the flag carrier of Belgium
- R.W.D.M. Brussels F.C., Belgian football club
- SS Brussels, a 1902 passenger ferry

== See also ==
- Brussels and the European Union
  - Institutions of the European Union
- Brussels Agreement (disambiguation)
- Caroline Hodgson (1851–1908) known as "Madame Brussels", Australian brothel keeper
- Brussel, a surname
