= Edinburgh Pharmacopoeia =

Medical guide

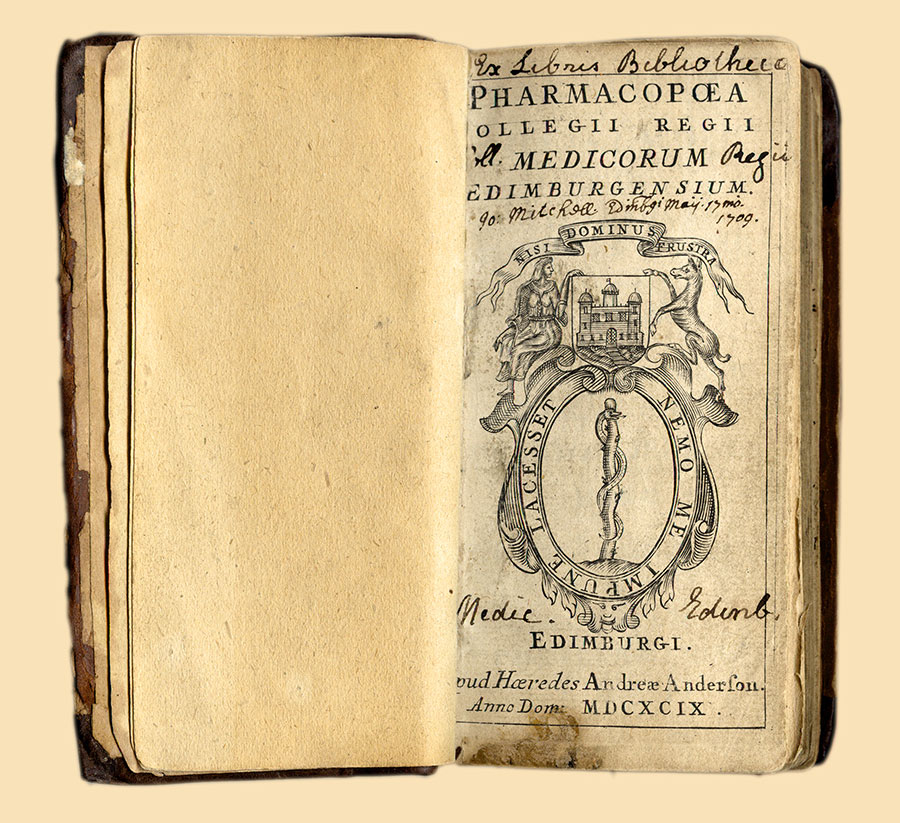
The title page of the first draft

The Edinburgh Pharmacopoeia was a medical guide consisting of recipes and methods for making medicine. It was first published by the Royal College of Physicians of Edinburgh in 1699 as the Pharmacopoea Collegii Regii Medicorum Edimburgensium. The Edinburgh Pharmacopeia merged with the London and Dublin Pharmacopoeia's in 1864 creating the British Pharmacopoeia.

== History ==
The precedence for creating a pharmacopoeia went back to 1618 when the College of Physicians of London created their own London Pharmacopoeia to regulate the manufacture of medicine. The first edition of the Edinburgh Pharmacopoeia was created in a period of tension between physicians and surgeons and the College of Physicians in Edinburgh sought to regulate the practice of medicine by providing standardized recipes. The first item in the College of Physician's minutes in 1682 note the need for a committee for creating a pharmacopoeia.

The committee for the creation of the pharmacopoeia struggled for the next seventeen years, finally agreeing upon a text and publishing the first edition of the Edinburgh Pharmacopoeia in 1699. The first edition was rife with dispute amongst the College of Physicians. Robert Sibbald was a main figure in its eventual publication, however the College divided into two camps; the 'new science' and Sibbald's dated faction. Members of the College not only disagreed on content of the pharmacopoeia, but style and structure as well.

== Revision ==
Unlike the London Pharmacopoeia, the Edinburgh Pharmacopoeia went through many editions and revisions. In the 142 years from initial publication to the merging into the British Pharmacopoeia, the Edinburgh Pharmacopoeia had twelve acknowledged editions, the last two in English. Opposition to revision argued that it made the pharmacopoeia appear unstable but proponents argued it kept the pharmacopoeia relevant with scientific and medical developments. The last two editions were published in English under the title The Pharmacopoeia of the Royal College of Physicians of Edinburgh. From 1864, the Edinburgh Pharmacopoeia combined with the London and Dublin editions to create the British Pharmacopoeia, which is still in circulation today.

=== Editions ===
- First - 1699
- Second - 1722
- Third - 1735
- Fourth - 1744
- Fifth - 1756
- Sixth - 1774
- Seventh - 1783
- Eighth - 1792
- Ninth - 1803
- Revised Ninth - 1805
- Tenth - 1817
- Eleventh (first in English) - 1839
- Twelfth (second in English) - 1841
