= USP 800 =

Hazardous drug handling guideline

USP 800 (Hazardous Drugs—Handling in Healthcare Settings) is a guideline created by the United States Pharmacopeia Convention (USP), as one of their General Chapters through which the USP "sets quality standards for medicines, dietary supplements and food ingredients". USP 800 provides guidance about the handling of hazardous drugs (HDs) in the healthcare setting. It was published on February 1, 2016, and originally planned for implementation in December 2019; however, implementation has been delayed.

== Scope ==
USP 800 describes practice and quality standards for the handling of HDs involving but not limited to the receipt, storage, compounding, dispensing, administration, and disposal of sterile and non-sterile products. This chapter applies to any personnel who may be exposed to HDs. Personnel likely to be exposed may include pharmacists, pharmacy technicians, nurses, physician assistants, home healthcare workers, veterinarians, and veterinary technicians.

== Requirements ==
Facilities that handle HDs must follow the standards outlined in USP 800. At minimum the facilities's management system must include:

- A list of HDs
- Facility and engineering controls
- Competent personnel
- Safe work practices
- Proper use of appropriate Personal Protective Equipment (PPE)
- Policies for HD waste segregation and disposal

=== List of hazardous drugs ===
The National Institute for Occupational Safety and Health (NIOSH) maintains a list of antineoplastic and HDs that are used in healthcare settings. The site must maintain a list of any drugs they use that are on the NIOSH list and it must be updated every 12 months. If the facility begins using a new medication on the NIOSH list it must be added to their HD list.

=== Responsibilities of people handling hazardous drugs ===
Each facility must have a designated person who develops, implements, and maintains USP 800 compliance. This person is also responsible for overseeing the training of personnel and reporting hazardous situations to the management team. All personnel who handle HDs must be trained on the fundamental practices and precautions to contain HDs.

=== Facilities and engineering controls ===
HDs must be handled in ways to limit contamination. HD storage areas must be separated from break rooms and refreshment areas. Designated areas must be available for:

- Receipt and unpacking
- Storage of HDs
- Non-sterile and sterile HD compounding

=== Receipt ===
Antineoplastic HDs and all HD active pharmaceutical ingredients (APIs) must be unpacked in an area that is neutral/normal or negative pressure.

=== Storage ===
HDs must be stored properly to prevent spillage or breakage. HDs should not be stored on the floor or areas prone to natural disaster such as earthquakes. Antineoplastic HDs that require further manipulation other than repackaging or counting must be stored separately from non-HDs. Sterile and non-sterile HDs must not be stored together. Refrigerated HDs must be stored in a dedicated refrigerator located in a negative pressure area.
