= Pill splitting =

Practice of dividing tablets or pills into smaller sizes

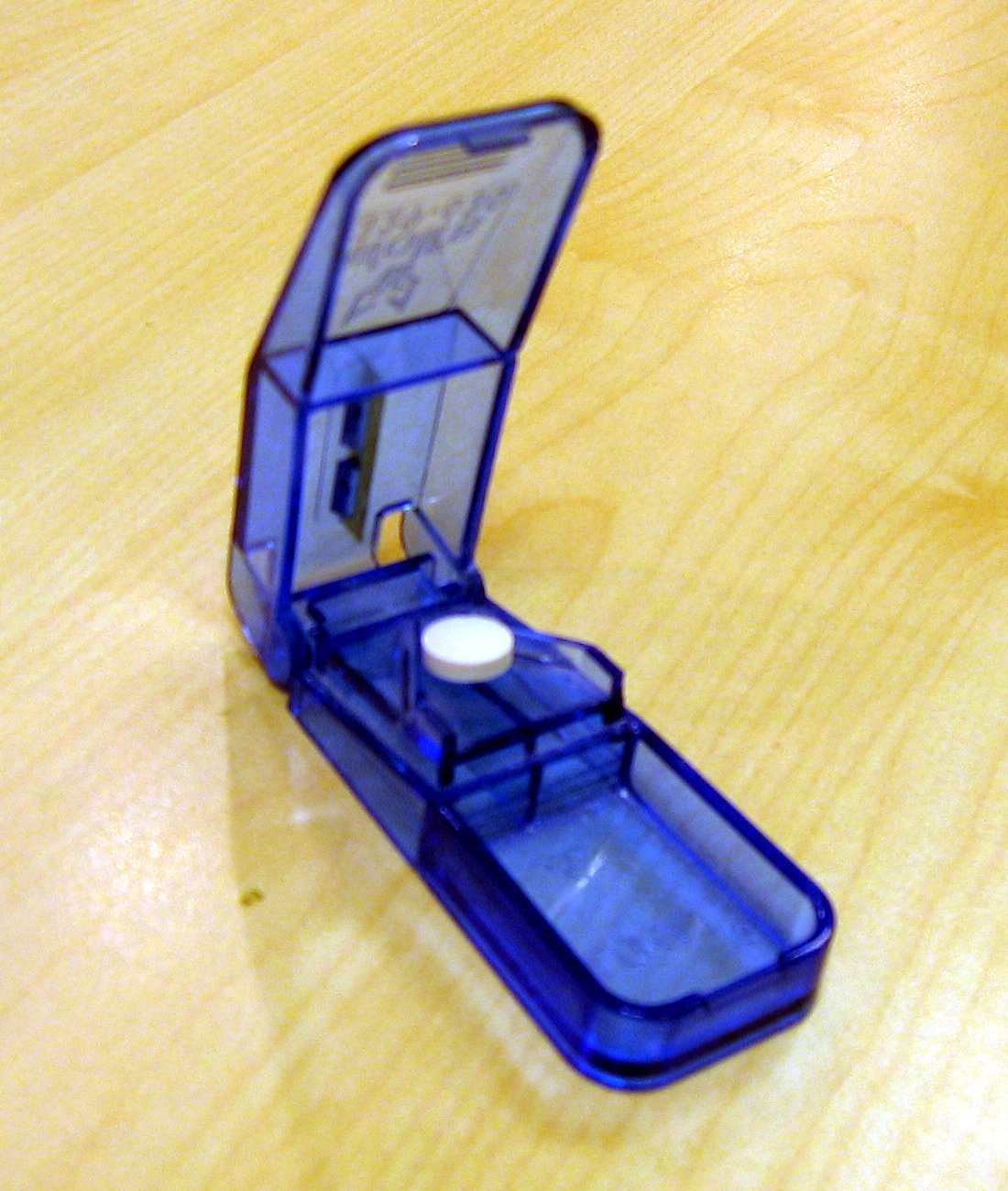
A pill-splitter holding a tablet ready to split

Pill splitting or tablet scoring refers to the practice of splitting a tablet or pill to provide a lower dose of the active ingredient, or to obtain multiple smaller doses, either to reduce cost or because the pills available are of a larger dose than required. Many pills that are suitable for splitting (aspirin tablets for instance) come pre-scored with a breakable groove down their middle so that they may easily be halved.

It is unsafe to split some prescription medications.

== Pill splitters ==
A pill-splitter is a simple and inexpensive device to split medicinal pills or tablets, comprising some means of holding the tablet in place, a blade, and usually a compartment in which to store the unused part. The tablet is positioned, and the blade pressed down to split it. With care it is often possible to cut a tablet into quarters. Also available as consumer items are multiple pill splitters, which cut numerous round or oblong pills in one operation.

== Pill scoring ==
A drug manufacturer may score pills with a groove to both indicate that a pill may be split and to aid the practice of splitting pills. When manufacturers do create grooves in pills, the groove must be consistent for consumers to be able to use them effectively. Many manufacturers choose to not use grooves. The United States government Center for Drug Evaluation and Research makes the following recommendations for manufacturers when scoring pills with grooves:

1. Pills should only have grooves if the split dosage is at least the minimum therapeutic dosage of the medication
2. The split pill should not create a toxicity hazard
3. Drugs which should not be split should not be scored with a groove
4. The split pill should be stable for the expected temperature and humidity
5. The split pill should have an equivalent effect to a full pill at an equivalent dose

== Dosage uniformity ==
In the U.S. "uniformity of dosage units" is defined by the United States Pharmacopeia (USP), which describes itself as "the official public standards-setting authority for all prescription and over-the-counter medicines, dietary supplements, and other healthcare products manufactured and sold in the United States." More than 140 countries develop or rely upon US pharmaceutical standards according to the USP.

The USP standard for dosage uniformity expresses statistical criteria in the complex language of sampling protocols. The pharmaceutical dosage literature sometimes boils this down as requiring a standard deviation in dosage weight of less than 6%, which roughly corresponds to the weaker rule-of-thumb offered for public consumption that the vast majority of dosage units should be within 15% of the dosage target. "Dosage unit" is a technical term which covers oral medications (tablets, pills, capsules), as well as non-oral delivery methods.

A 2002 study of pill-splitting as conducted in four American long-term care facilities determined that 15 of the 22 dispensed prescriptions evaluated (68%) had fragment weight variance in excess of USP standards.

== Cost savings ==
Pill-splitting can be used to save money on pharmaceutical costs, as many prescription pharmaceuticals are sold at prices less than proportional to the dose. For example, a 10 mg tablet of a drug might be sold for the same or nearly the same price as a 5 mg tablet. Splitting 10 mg tablets allows the patient to purchase half the number of tablets at a lower price than the same weight of 5 mg tablets.

U.S. medications suitable for pill splitting As listed in 2002 Stanford study
Medication	Drug class
clonazepam	psychiatric
doxazosin	blood pressure
atorvastatin	cholesterol
pravastatin	cholesterol
citalopram	psychiatric
sertraline	psychiatric
paroxetine	psychiatric
lisinopril	blood pressure
nefazodone *	psychiatric
olanzapine	psychiatric
sildenafil	erectile dysfunction
* Serzone brand discontinued 2004 in U.S.

Both specialist and generalist physicians are not sufficiently aware of and do not communicate with patients about the cost to them of medication.

=== Some potentially suitable medications ===
Randall Stafford of the Stanford School of Medicine published a study in 2002 of common prescription medications in the United States in which he evaluates pill splitting for "potential cost savings and clinical appropriateness". The study identifies eleven prescription medications that satisfied the study criteria, based on the American pharmaceutical cost structure, pill formulation, and dosages of the time. Most of the medications listed in the table from the psychiatric drug class are antidepressants.

=== Uniformity of split ===
Not all tablets split equally well. In a 2002 study, Paxil, Zestril and Zoloft split cleanly with 0% rejects. Glucophage was described as a hard tablet, requiring significant force, causing tablet halves to fly. Glyburide exhibited very poor splitting with many splitting into multiple pieces. Hydrodiuril and Oretic crumbled. Lipitor did not split cleanly, and the coating peeled. The diamond shaped Viagra tablets made location of the midline difficult. The worst result reported was Oretic 25 mg in which 60% of tablets failed to split to within 15% of target weight.

=== Alternative purpose ===
Some drugs have a few different uses, and are usually sold in different packages and different doses for different applications. The price for some applications may be very different from that for other purposes. One example is Minoxidil, which is well known as a hair-growth stimulant; the same drug under the name Loniten is used for blood pressure control in much larger doses at a much lower price per unit weight.

== Risks ==
The Food and Drug Administration (FDA) has called pill splitting "risky". At the same time, the FDA approves the manufacture of pills which are intended to be split.

Splitting pills may result in uneven splitting and creating pieces which will not deliver accurate dosage. Pills which are split might not be correctly halved, making the cut pieces unequal in size. Some pills are difficult to split, or prone to crumbling instead of splitting cleanly. Some pills (particularly some time release drugs) are unsafe to split, and there could be mistakes in identifying when pills should not be split.

== Lawsuits ==
In a California court filing dated April 2001, Trial Lawyers for Public Justice (TLPJ) brought a class-action lawsuit against Kaiser Permanente (Timmis v. Kaiser Permanente), which required its members to split prescription pills, on the grounds that "Kaiser's mandatory pill-splitting policy endangers patients' health solely to enhance the HMO's profits" in violation of the California Unfair Competition Law (UCL) and the California Consumer Legal Remedies Act (CLRA). In December 2004, the California Court of Appeal affirmed the trial court ruling that Kaiser's policy did not violate UCL or CLRA, noting that the suit had failed to present evidence that the policy was unsafe.

== See also ==
- Inverse benefit law
