= Iranian National Formulary =

Molecules registered at Iran's Ministry of Health

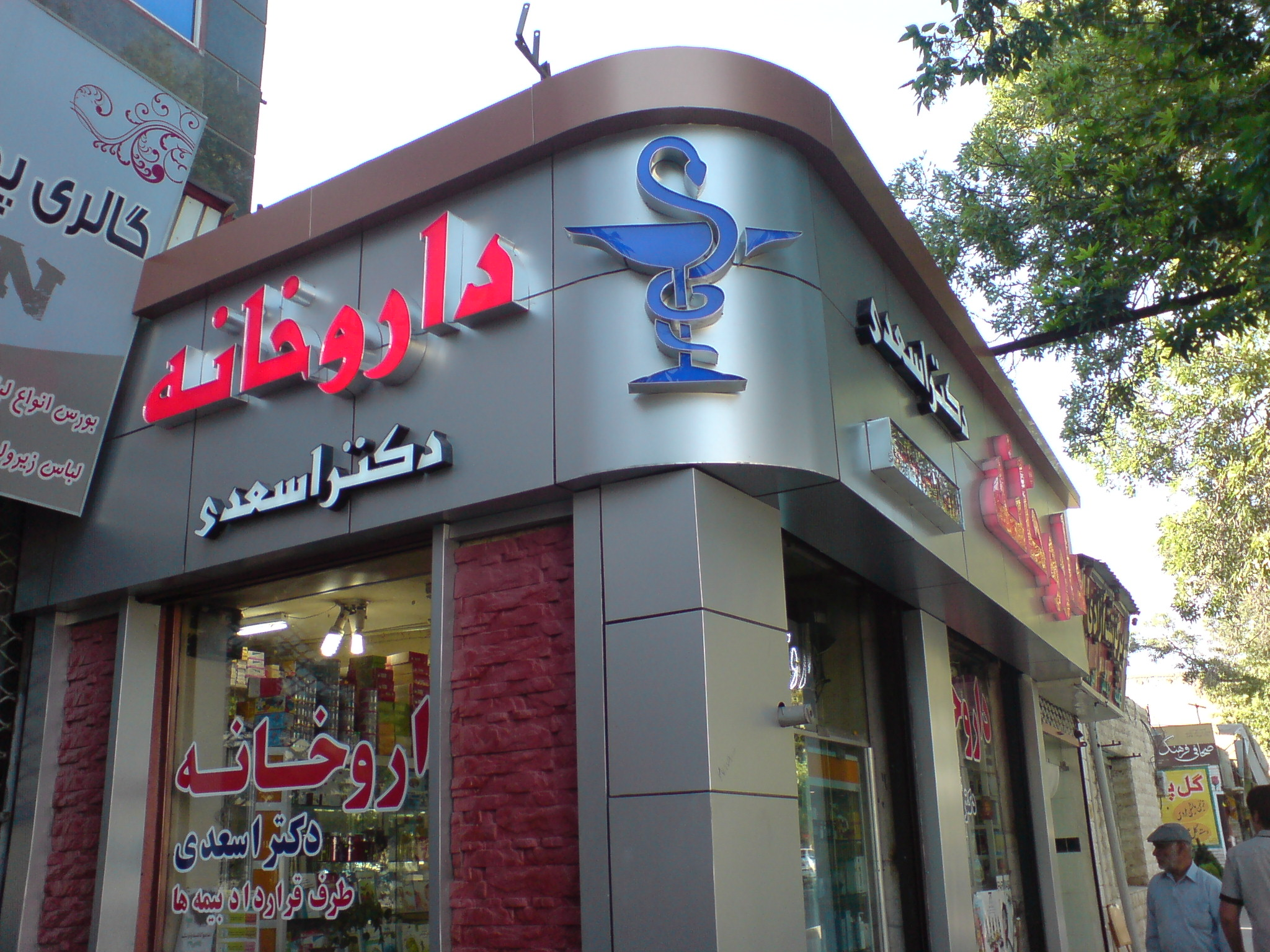
A Pharmacy in Iranian city of Nishapur

The Iranian National Formulary (INF) has more than 2,300 molecules registered at Iran's Ministry of Health, including various strengths and dosage forms. The standards regarding pharmaceutical products in Iran are determined and modified by the Pharmacopeia Council.

Iran has adopted a full generic-based National Drug Policy (NDP), with local production of essential drugs and vaccines as one of the main goals.

== Top 20 drug molecules and sales in Iran ==
Top 20 molecules
	Molecule	Sales for the first 6 month of 2010 (in Iranian Rials)
1	INTERFERON	423,996,630,000
2	CEFIXIME	397,896,015,000
3	AMOXICILLIN	323,624,414,264
4	CO-AMOXICLAV	231,047,948,600
5	ACETAMINOPHEN	210,953,849,492
6	ALBUMIN	210,632,806,000
7	DOCETAXEL	182,924,555,600
8	IMIPENEM+CILASTATAIN	181,099,640,000
9	CLOPIDOGREL	169,915,498,015
10	IMMUNE GLOBULIN	160,575,717,000
11	ENOXAPARIN	145,486,724,600
12	CEFALEXIN	142,499,418,000
13	DEXTROSE	141,272,434,000
14	ATORVASTATIN	132,514,275,600
15	PANTOPRAZOL	130,971,241,400
16	SALMETEROL	127,780,028,000
17	SODIUM CHLORIDE	126,043,613,100
18	IBUPROFEN	125,621,562,500
19	RITUXIMAB	118,690,006,000
20	ERYTHROPOIETIN	110,191,720,000

== See also ==
- Pharmaceuticals in Iran
