= Brussels Agreement (1924) =

1924 multilateral treaty

The Brussels Agreement (formally the International Agreement respecting Facilities to be given to Merchant Seamen for the Treatment of Venereal Diseases) is a 1924 multilateral treaty whereby states agreed to provide free or low-cost medical facilities in ports where merchant seamen could be treated for sexually transmitted diseases.

The Brussels Agreement was concluded in Brussels, Belgium on 1924. The treaty entered into force on 1925. The Agreement was widely ratified and its effects were studied by a 1958 World Health Organization (WHO) study group. The WHO determined that the Agreement had been successful at improving the health of merchant seamen. The treaty remains in force for 70 states. It was most recently ratified by Papua New Guinea, in 1977.

Belgium is the official depositary for the treaty.
