= Japanese Pharmacopoeia =

Official pharmacopoeia of Japan

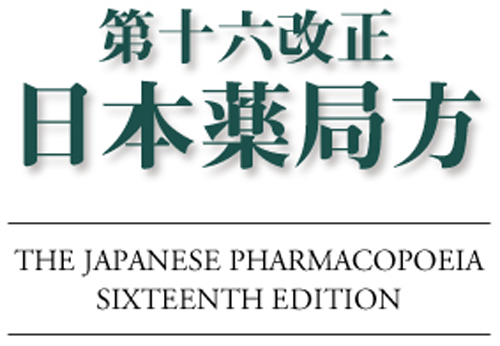

The Japanese Pharmacopoeia (Japanese: 日本薬局方, Hepburn: Nihon Yakkyokuhō) is the official pharmacopoeia of Japan. It is published by the Pharmaceuticals and Medical Devices Agency (独立行政法人 医薬品医療機器総合機構, Dokuritsu-gyōsei hōjin iyakuhin-iryō-kiki-sōgō-kikō). The first edition was published on 25 June 1886, with revisions being issued from time to time. The current revision is number 18, issued electronically on 7 June 2021. An official English translation is in preparation (status: 06 Aug 2021).

== See also ==
- The International Pharmacopoeia
- Japanese Accepted Name
