= Brussels Pharmacopoeia Agreement (1902) =

Former treaty, precursor of the International Pharmacopoeia

First Brussels Pharmacopoeia Agreement
Agreement respecting the Unification of Pharmacopoeial Formulas for Potent Drugs
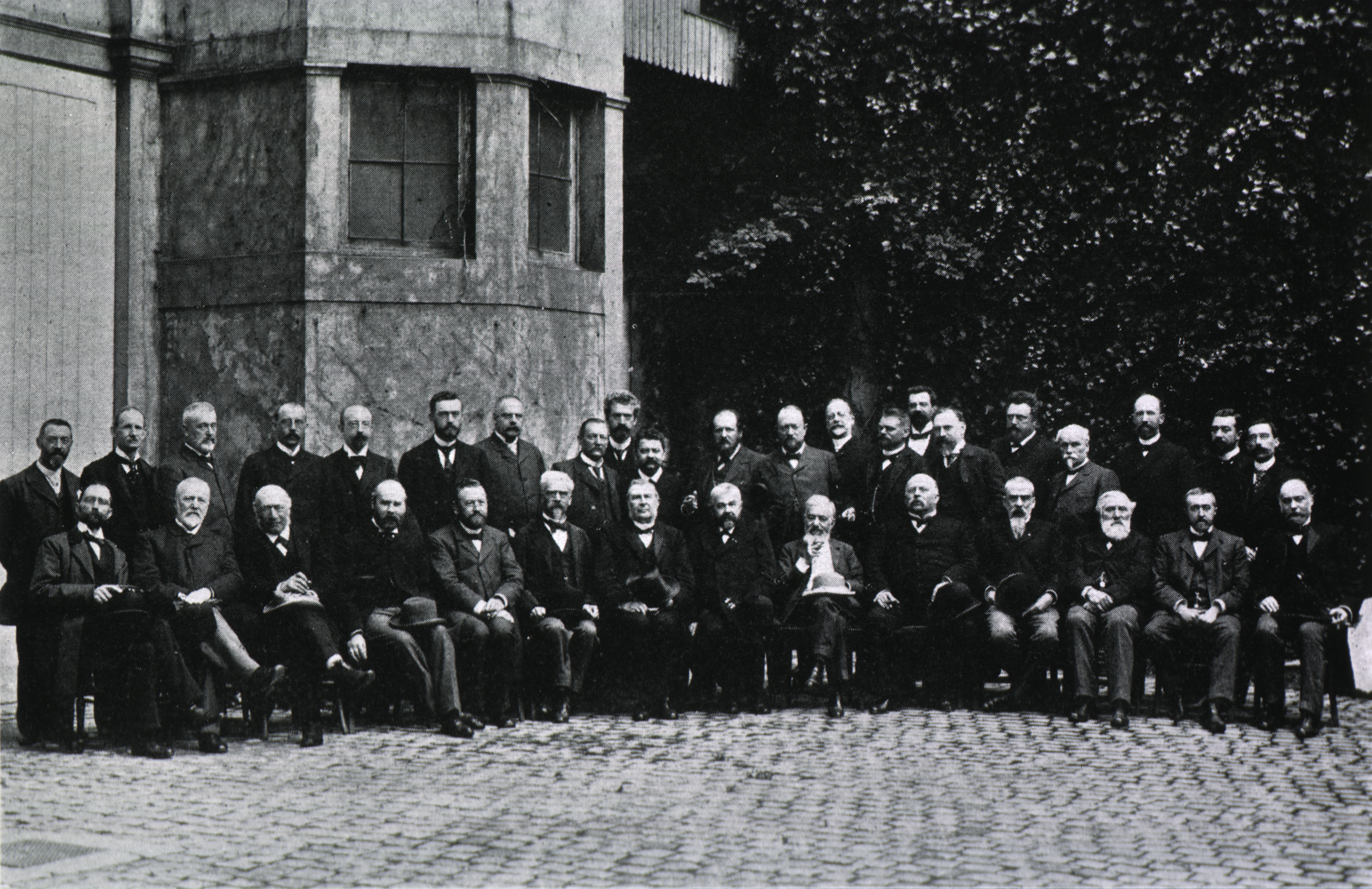
- Delegates at the 1902 International Pharmacopoeia Conference, Rue de la Loi 16, Brussels
- Type: Treaty
- Context: Harmonization of pharmacopoeias
- Drafted: 20 September 1902
- Signed: 29 November 1906
- Location: Belgian Ministry of Foreign Affairs, Brussels, Belgium
- Effective: 29 December 1906
- Expiry: 1929
- Mediators: Belgium
- Negotiators: Austria-Hungary; Belgium; Bulgaria; Denmark; France; Germany; Greece; Italy; Luxembourg; Netherlands; Norway; Portugal; Russian Empire; Spain; Sweden; Switzerland; United Kingdom; United States of America
- Original signatories: Austria-Hungary; Belgium; Bulgaria; Denmark; France; Germany; Greece; Italy; Luxembourg; Netherlands; Norway; Russian Empire; Serbia; Spain; Sweden; Switzerland; United Kingdom; United States of America
- Depositary: Belgium
- Language: French

The Agreement respecting the Unification of Pharmacopoeial Formulas for Potent Drugs, informally known as the 1902 Brussels Pharmacopoeia Agreement (French: Officially in French: Arrangement International pour l'Unification de la Formule des Médicaments Héroïques), was an international treaty to harmonize the monographs of certain medical substances between national pharmacopoeias, negotiated in 1902 and signed in 1906. It was succeeded by the 1925 Brussels Pharmacopoeia Agreement.

== Background ==
The first international pharmaceutical congress was held in Strasbourg in 1867, and emitted the wish that an international pharmacopoeia be compiled. There were subsequently dozens of international pharmaceutical congresses in Europe which prepared the entreprise.

== 1902 Brussels Conference ==
From 15 to 20 September 1902, pharmacists from Austria-Hungary, Belgium, Bulgaria, Denmark, France, Greece, Germany, Italy, Luxembourg, Netherlands, Russia, Sweden, and the UK (Portugal were announced but excused) met in Brussels to discuss a possible international pharmacopoeia. Dr. A. Devaux, Belgian Inspector general for hygiene, was elected Conference President.

They finally agreed on a list of 49 harmonized monographs (41 of which included specifications for preparation) for pharmaceutical preparations such as iodine, cocaine, opium. Through this binding multilateral treaty, States pledged to unify pharmacopoeial standards by including the unified nomenclature and formulas when revising their national pharmacopoeias.

== 1906 Signature ==
Four years later, 18 delegations (all European countries with the exception of the United States) met at the Belgian Ministry of Foreign Affairs on 29 November 1906 for a ceremony of signature of the final Agreement, which had only been revised formally.

However, the treaty had weak enforcement mechanisms, poor administrative provisions, and implementation was uneven. Funding reluctance, the outbreak of the World War I, and the rise of the League of Nations finished to convince the need to revise the 1902/1906 Agreement. Following World War I and in light of growing international pharmaceutical trade and the League of Nations' emerging role in public health, a revised treaty was negotiated in 1925.

== See also ==
- Brussels Pharmacopoeia Agreement (1925)
- The International Pharmacopoeia
- European Pharmacopoeia
- 1912 First International Opium Convention
- 1925 Second International Opium Convention
- League of Nations
- International Office of Public Hygiene
- World Health Organization
- International Pharmaceutical Federation
