= USP Controlled Room Temperature =

Pharmaceutical storage guideline

The USP Controlled Room Temperature is a series of United States Pharmacopeia guidelines for the storage of pharmaceuticals; the relevant omnibus standard is USP 797. Although 100% compliance remains challenging for any given facility, the larger protocol may be regarded as constituting a form of clean room which is included in a suite of best practices.
