= Brussels Pharmacopoeia Agreement (1925) =

Former treaty, precursor of the International Pharmacopoeia

Second Brussels Pharmacopoeia Agreement
Agreement revising the Agreement respecting the Unification of Pharmacopoeial Formulas for Potent Drugs
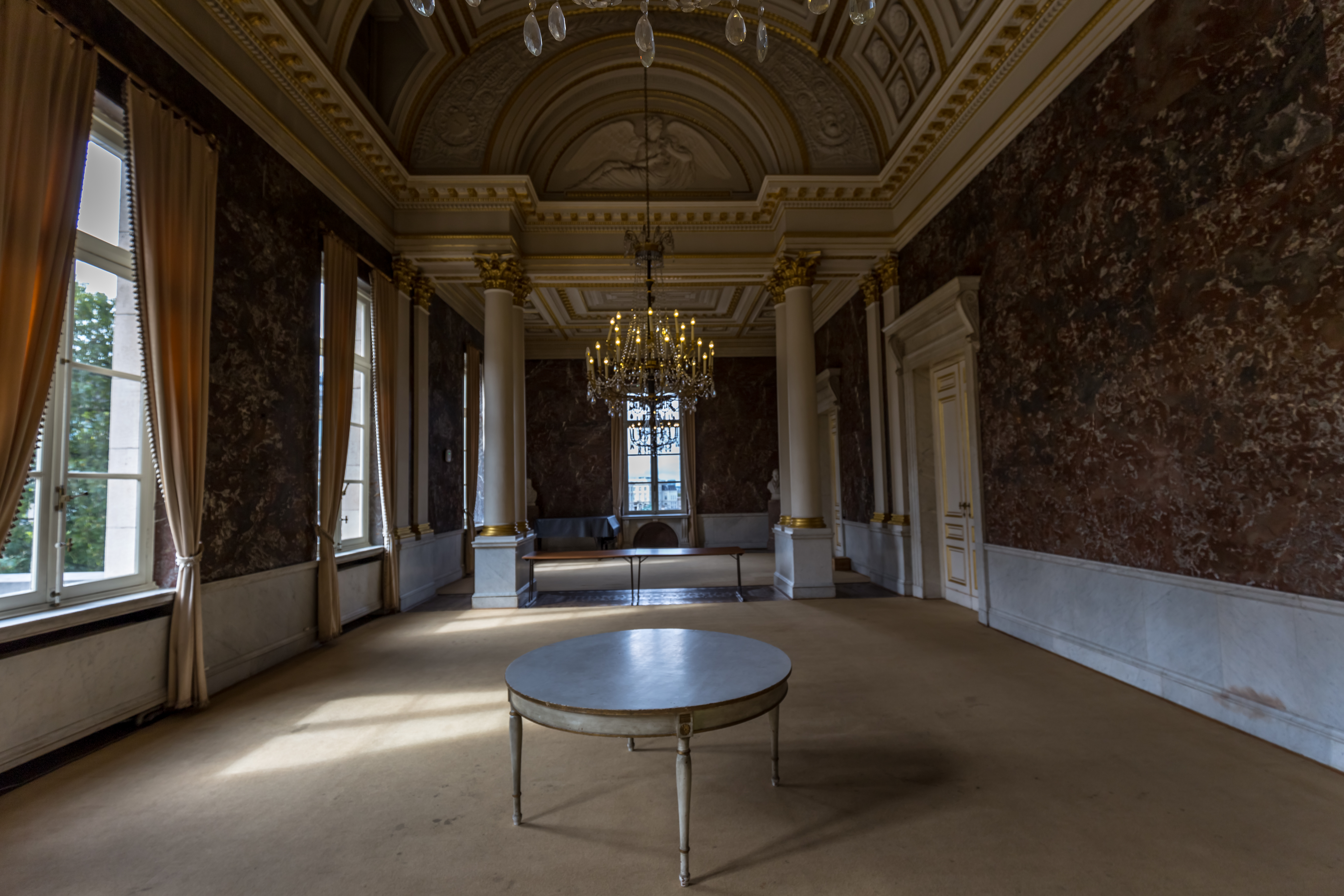
- The room where the 1925 negotiations took place, Academy Palace, Brussels
- Type: Treaty
- Context: Harmonization of pharmacopoeias
- Drafted: 19 September 1925
- Signed: 20 August 1929
- Location: Brussels, Belgium
- Expiry: 20 May 1952
- Mediators: Belgium
- Negotiators: League of Nations (observer); Argentina; Australia; Austria; Belgium; Bulgaria; Colombia; Cuba; Denmark; Egypt; Finland; France; German Empire; Kingdom of Greece; Hungary; Irish Free State; Italy; Empire of Japan; Latvia; Luxembourg; Netherlands; Norway; Peru; Poland; Romania; Spain; Sweden; Switzerland; Turkey; Union of South Africa; United Kingdom; USA; Kingdom of Yugoslavia; Canada (absent); Haiti (absent)
- Original signatories: Austria; Belgium; Bulgaria; Denmark; Finland; France; German Empire; Kingdom of Greece; Hungary; Irish Free State; Italy; Latvia; Luxembourg; Netherlands; Norway; Poland; Romania; Spain; Sweden; Switzerland; Turkey; United Kingdom; Yugoslavia
- Depositary: Belgium
- Language: French
- UN Archives Geneva

The Agreement revising the Agreement respecting the Unification of Pharmacopoeial Formulas for Potent Drugs, informally known as the 1925 Brussels Pharmacopoeia Agreement (French: Officially in French: Arrangement révisant l'Arrangement International pour l'Unification de la Formule des Médicaments Héroïques), was an international treaty to harmonize the monographs of certain medical substances between national pharmacopoeias, negotiated in 1925 and signed in 1929. It succeeded a previous Agreement negotiated in 1902 and signed in 1906 in Brussels, and was terminated in 1952.

== Background ==
The first international pharmaceutical congress was held in Strasbourg in 1867, and emitted the wish that an international pharmacopoeia be compiled. There were subsequently dozens of international pharmaceutical congresses in Europe which prepared the enterprise.

=== First Agreement in 1902 (signed 1906) ===
The original Brussels Pharmacopoeia Agreement, originally agreed on in Brussels in 1902 and finally adopted in December 1906 by 19 mainly European countries. It aimed to standardize 49 pharmaceutical preparations (e.g. iodine, cocaine, opium) through a multilateral treaty.

== 1925 Brussels Conference ==
Following World War I and in light of growing international pharmaceutical trade and the League of Nations' emerging role in public health, a revised treaty was negotiated in 1925. This second conference met in Brussels' Academy Palace from 10 to 29 September 1925, resulting in a revised international agreement.

This version, agreed upon at a conference in Brussels with broader international participation, expanded the harmonized list to 77 items (including cannabis and digitalis), introduced dosage standards, and established a provisional "Permanent International Pharmacopoeia Secretariat". The countries that signed in 1925 were Austria, Belgium, Bulgaria, Denmark, Finland, France, Germany, Greece, Hungary, Ireland, Italy, Latvia, Luxembourg, Netherlands, Norway, Poland, Romania, Spain, Sweden, Switzerland, Turkey, UK, and Yugoslavia.

The treaty entered into force in 1929. Despite not explicitly referring to an "international pharmacopoeia", the treaty allowed for harmonized national monographs to bear the abbreviation "P. I." (for protocole international), which was often misread as Pharmacopoeia Internationalis. The German pharmacopoeia DAB 6 interpreted it as Præscripcio Internationalis (international prescription).

While uptake of the 1925 formulae was greater than the 1906 version, both agreements ultimately fell short of fully standardizing pharmaceutical texts across countries. Much more countries included harmonizes monographs in their national pharmacopoeias, but they often cherry-picked which monographs to harmonize.

== Treaty provisions ==
According to the International Pharmacopoeia,

This 41-article agreement stipulated that the League of Nations would be responsible for the administrative work to produce a unified pharmacopoeia, and a permanent secretariat of an international organization would coordinate the work of national pharmacopoeial commissions. General principles for the preparation of galenicals, maximal doses, nomenclature and biological testing of arsenobenzenes were included in the articles of this agreement, as was a table of dosage strengths and descriptions for 77 drug substances and preparations.

== Termination ==
In May 1952, diplomats agreed in Geneva to terminate the 1925 Brussels Agreement, noting that:

the publication by the World Health Organization of the Pharmacopoea Internationalis has rendered generally obsolete the provisions of the Agreements signed at Brussels on 29 November 1906 and 20 August 1929 for the Unification of Pharmacopoeial Formulas for Potent Drugs

Edited since 1951, the WHO's International Pharmacopoeia (Ph.Int.) is seen as the continuation of the 1902/1906 and 1925/1929 Brussels Agreements.

== See also ==
- The International Pharmacopoeia
- European Pharmacopoeia
- Second International Opium Convention
- League of Nations
- International Office of Public Hygiene
- World Health Organization
- Centenary of Cannabis prohibition
