= European Pharmacopoeia =

Major multinational pharmacopoeia published by the European Union

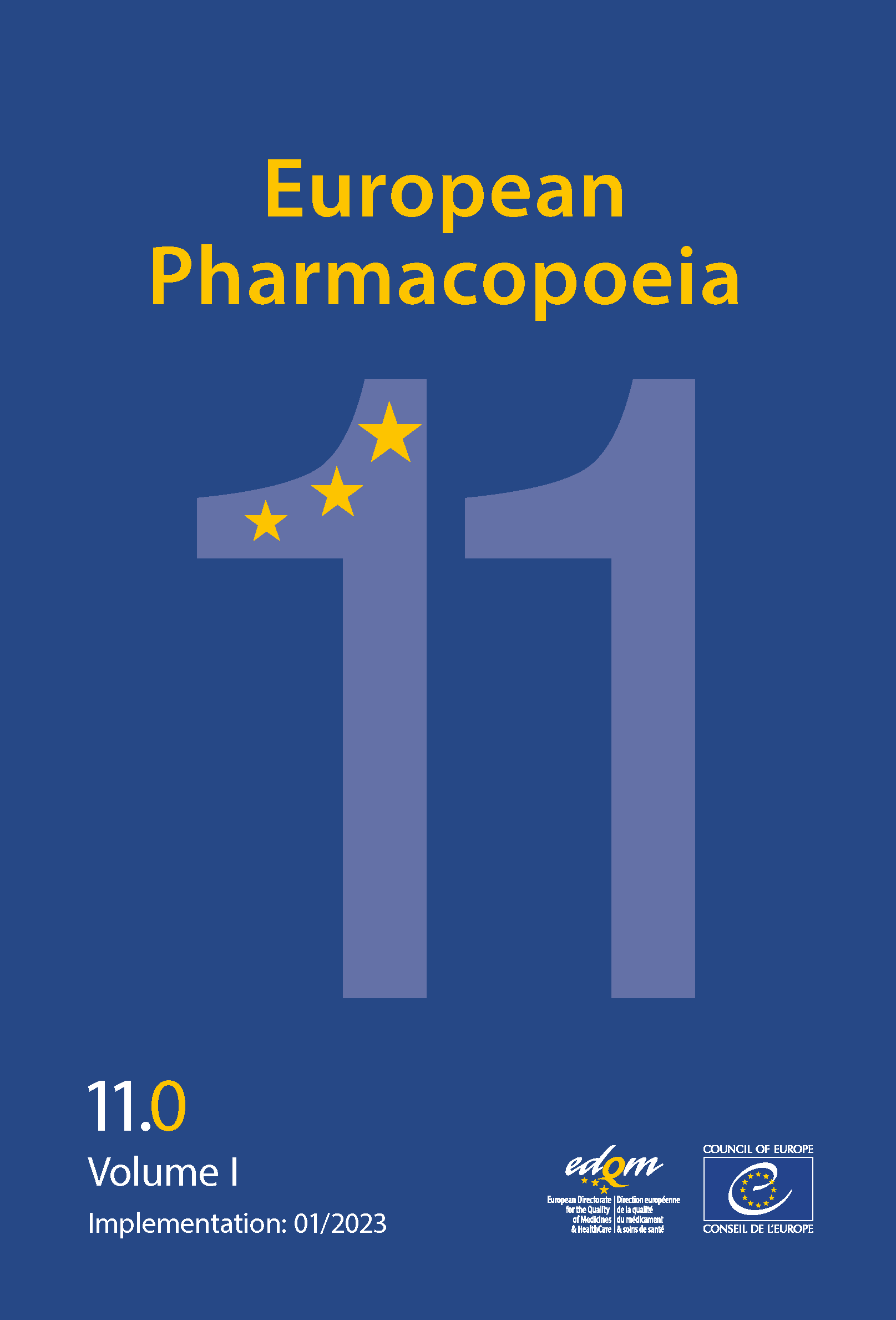
Cover of the European Pharmacopoeia, 11th Edition

The European Pharmacopoeia (Pharmacopoeia Europaea, Ph. Eur.) is a major regional pharmacopoeia which provides common quality standards throughout the pharmaceutical industry in Europe to control the quality of medicines, and the substances used to manufacture them. It is a published collection of monographs which describe both the individual and general quality standards for ingredients, dosage forms, and methods of analysis for medicines. These standards apply to medicines for both human and veterinary use.

== Legal basis ==
The European Pharmacopoeia has a legally binding character. It is used as an official reference to serve public health, and is part of the regulatory requirements for obtaining a Marketing Authorisation (MA) for a medicinal (human or veterinary) product. The quality standards of the European Pharmacopoeia apply throughout the entire life-cycle of a product, and become legally binding and mandatory on the same date in all thirty-nine (39) signatory states, which include all European Union member states.

Several legal texts make the European Pharmacopoeia mandatory in Europe. The Convention on the Elaboration of a European Pharmacopoeia (ETS No. 50) which was adopted by the Council of Europe in 1964, laid the groundwork for the development of the European Pharmacopoeia. In 1994, a Protocol (ETS No. 134) was adopted, amending the convention to prepare for the accession of the European Union (EU), and defining the respective powers of the European Union and its member states within the European Pharmacopoeia Commission.

European Union Directive 2001/82/EC and Directive 2001/83/EC, (as amended) state the legally binding character of European Pharmacopoeia texts for Marketing Authorisation Applications (MAA). All manufacturers of medicines or substances for pharmaceutical use therefore must apply the European Pharmacopoeia quality standards in order to be able to market and use these products in Europe.

As of February 2020, thirty-nine (39) member states and the European Union are signatories to the Convention on the Elaboration of a European Pharmacopoeia. There are 30 observers in all: five European countries, 23 non-European countries, the World Health Organization (WHO) and the Taiwan Food and Drug Administration (TFDA) of the Ministry of Health and Welfare.

== The European Pharmacopoeia Commission ==
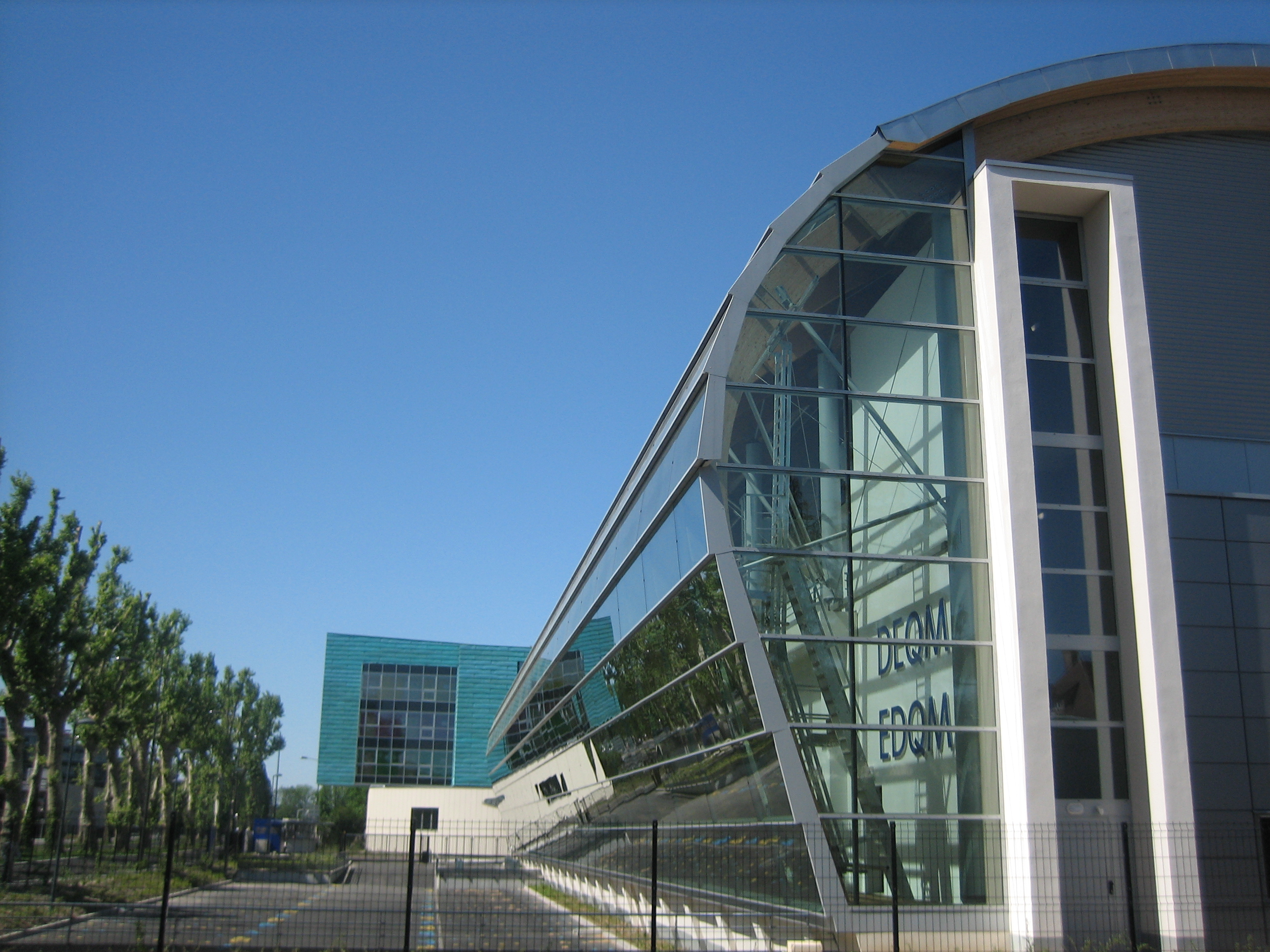
EDQM building, Strasbourg, France

While the European Directorate for the Quality of Medicines & HealthCare (EDQM), a directorate of the Council of Europe, provides scientific and administrative support for the European Pharmacopoeia, the governing body is the European Pharmacopoeia Commission. The European Pharmacopoeia Commission determines the general principles applicable to the elaboration of the European Pharmacopoeia. It also decides the work programme, sets up and appoints experts to the specialised groups responsible for preparing monographs, adopts these monographs, and recommends dates for the implementation of its decisions within the territories of the contracting parties.

This Commission meets in Strasbourg, France, three times a year, to adopt texts proposed by its groups of experts, and to decide on its programme of work and general policies. Items are added to the work programme in response to requests received by the European Directorate for the Quality of Medicines & HealthCare from the member states and their national authorities, industry or experts from around the world, based on current scientific and health issues. Each national delegation has one vote. In all technical questions, the decisions of the commission are taken by a unanimous vote of the national delegations that cast a vote. Member states' representatives mostly come from health authorities, national pharmacopoeia authorities and universities; and are appointed by the national authorities on the basis of their expertise. Representatives of the thirty (30) observers are invited to attend the sessions, but cannot vote.

The current chair of the commission is Prof. Salvador Cañigueral, elected in March 2022. The term of the chair is three years, and runs in parallel with other members of the commission's Presidium.

== Publication ==
The first edition of the European Pharmacopoeia was published in 1969, and consisted of 120 texts. The 11th edition, currently applicable, was published in July 2022. The Ph. Eur. is applicable in 39 European countries and used in over 130 countries worldwide. Nowadays it contains over 3000 texts (the monographs), covering all therapeutic areas and consisting of:

- individual texts describing legally-binding quality standards for substances used in the manufacture of medicines or medicine ingredients (including active pharmaceutical ingredients, excipients, herbals, etc.);
- individual texts describing legally-binding quality standards for finished products;
- general monographs describing legally-binding quality standards for classes of substances (such as fermentation products or substances for pharmaceutical use) or for the dosage forms that medicines can take (tablets, capsules, injections, etc.); and
- general methods of analysis of substances used in the manufacture of medicines, which are not legally binding and may also be used for substances and medicines not described in the Ph. Eur.

Ph. Eur. texts contain detailed analytical methods to identify the substance or product and control its quality and quantitative strength.

Ph. Eur. texts also address the issue of impurities in medicinal products, which do not offer any therapeutic benefit for the patient and sometimes are potentially toxic. Impurities are present at every stage of the manufacture of medicines: in starting materials, active pharmaceutical ingredients (APIs), reagents, intermediates, excipients and primary packaging materials. But Ph. Eur. texts’ section on impurities is perhaps the most essential part of a quality standard of an active substance.

A new edition of the European Pharmacopoeia is published every three years: in both English and French, by the Council of Europe. It is made available in print and electronic (online and downloadable) versions; the online version is also accessible from smartphones and tablet computers.

Translations into other languages are published by the member states themselves. For example, a German version is jointly published by Austria, Germany and Switzerland.

In the future, the former three-year cycle comprising one edition and eight supplements will be replaced by an annual edition made up of three issues, numbered .1 to .3 (for example, the 12th Edition will consist of issues 12.1, 12.2 and 12.3). Each of these issues will contain the new and revised texts adopted at one of the three European Pharmacopoeia Commission (EPC) sessions held annually. What will not change is the implementation schedule, which remains January, April and July, respectively, of the year following publication of a text "

== See also ==
- The International Pharmacopoeia
- Brussels Pharmacopoeia Agreement (1925)
