= The International Pharmacopoeia =

Global quality pharmacopoeia published by the World Health Organization

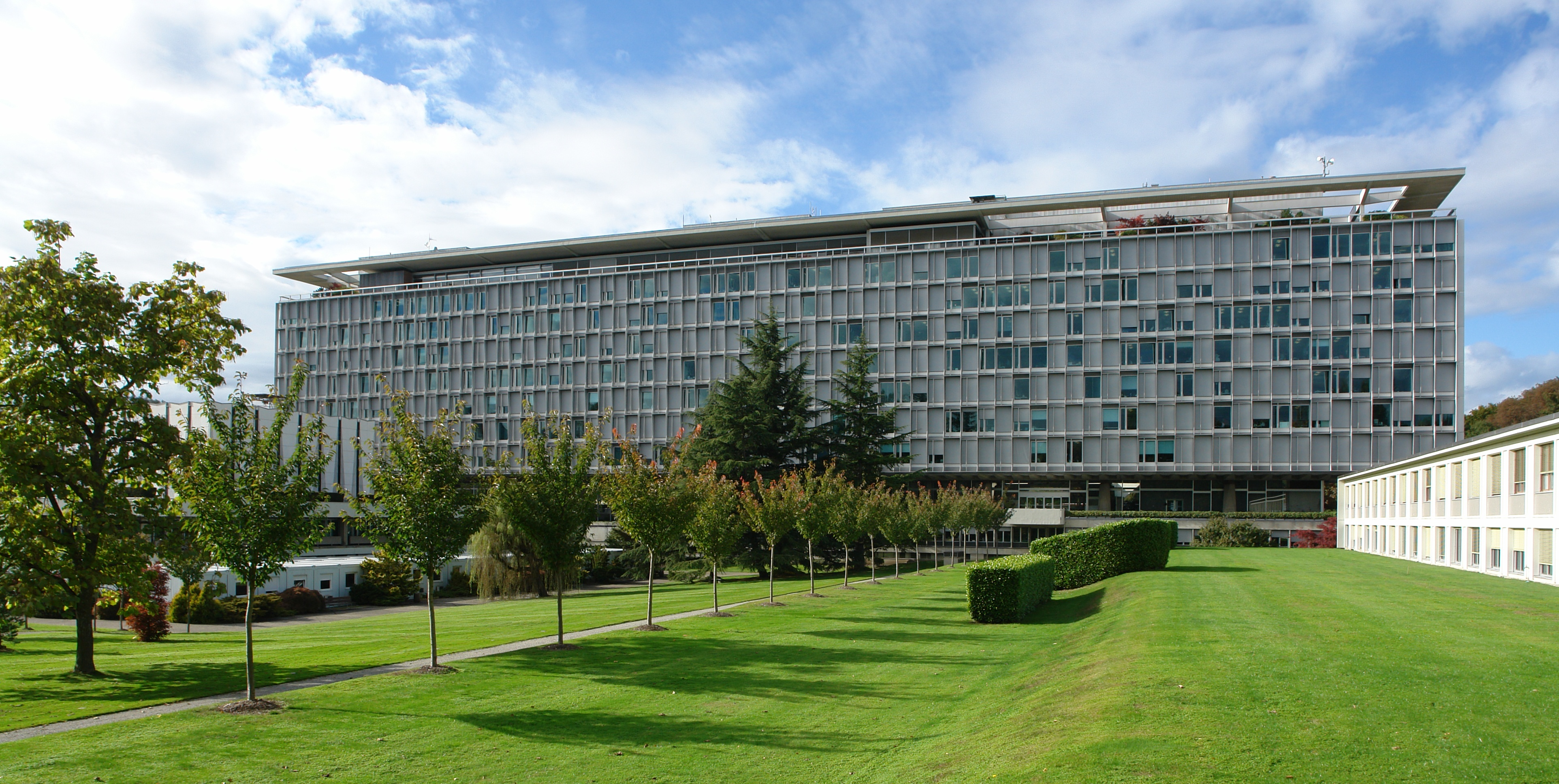
World Health Organization building from the South-East, Geneva

The International Pharmacopoeia (Pharmacopoeia Internationalis, or Ph. Int.) is a pharmacopoeia issued by the World Health Organization as a recommendation, with the aim to provide international quality specifications for pharmaceutical substances (active ingredients and excipients) and dosage forms, together with supporting general methods of analysis, for global use. Its texts can be used or adapted by any WHO member state wishing to establish legal pharmaceutical requirements.

== Contents ==
The Ph.Int. is based primarily on medicines included in the current WHO Model List of Essential Medicines (EML) and medicines included in the current invitations to manufacturers to submit an expression of interest (EOI) to the WHO Prequalification Team – Medicines (PQT) and those of interest to other UN Organizations. In recent years, priority has been given to medicines of importance in low and middle income countries, which may not appear in any other pharmacopoeias, including child-friendly dosage forms.

The Ph.Int. is designed to serve all Member States, especially their national and regional regulatory authorities, organizations in the United Nations system, and regional and interregional harmonization efforts, and they underpin important public health initiatives, including the prequalification and procurement of quality medicines through major international entities, such as the Global Fund to Fight AIDS, Tuberculosis and Malaria, and UNICEF.

The monographs published in the Ph.Int. are established in an independent manner via a consultative procedure and based on international experience. Monographs on radiopharmaceuticals developed with the International Atomic Energy Agency.

== History ==
=== Early history ===
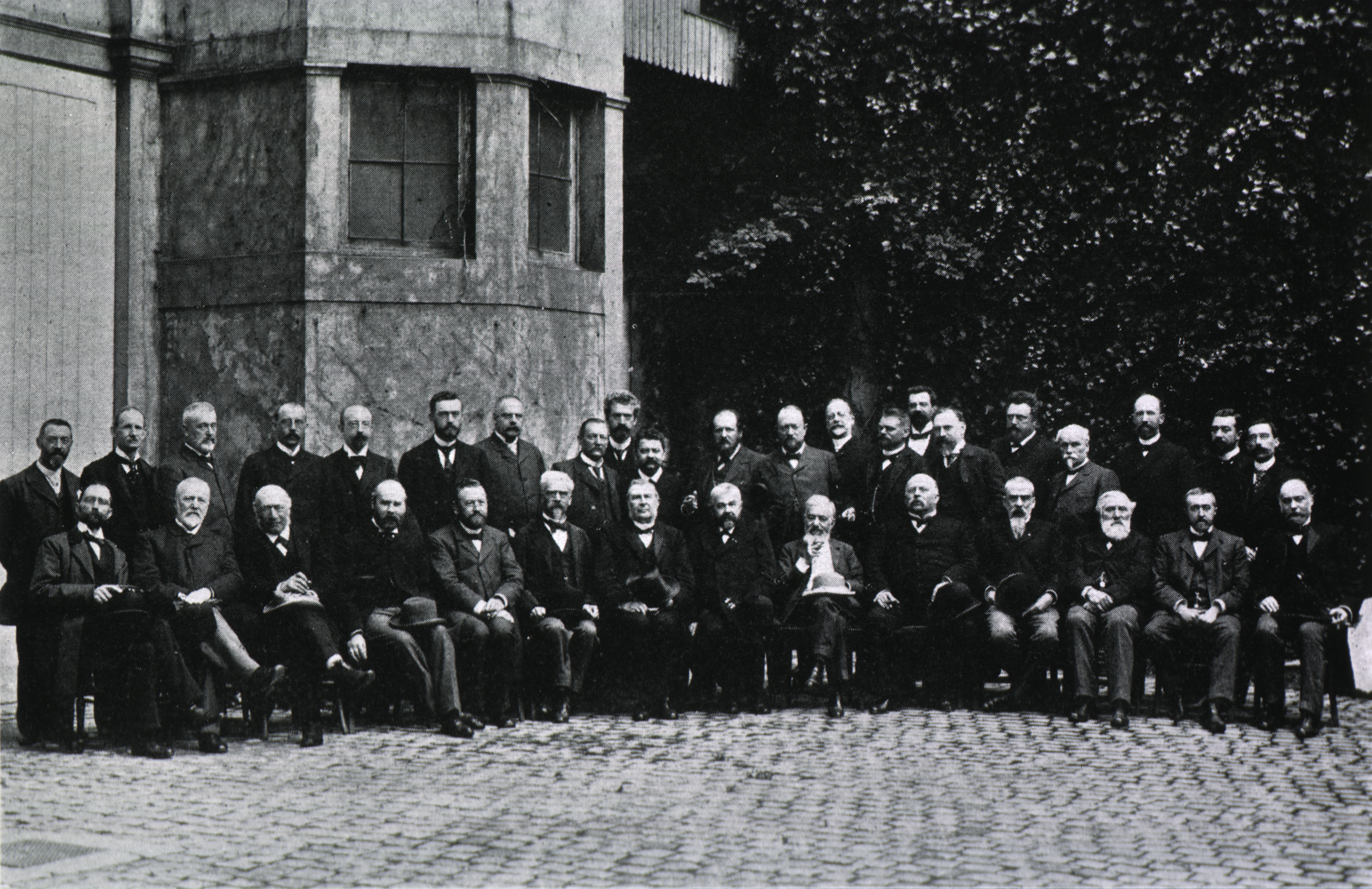
Delegates attending the 1902 International Conference for the Unification of the Formulae of Potent Drugs in Brussels

The first international pharmaceutical congress was held in Strasbourg in 1867, and emitted the wish that an international pharmacopoeia be compiled.

The "Conference for the Unification of the Formulae of Potent Medicaments" held in Brussels in 1902 was also the 10th pharmacists' congress. It resulted in a treaty considered as the start of the international pharmacopoeial project although "it took four years of textual adjustments before the Agreement could enter into force as a multilateral treaty in 19 (mostly European) countries, in December 1906"

A second conference met in Brussels' Academy Palace in 1925, resulting in the revised 1925 Brussels Pharmacopoeia Agreement.

After the Second World War, the World Health Organization took over the Brussels Agreement and its secretariat hosted by the League of Nations, and subsequently discontinued and replaced the 1925 Brussels Agreement with the International Pharmacopoeia edited since 1951.

=== Editions ===
Sort	Edition number	Year	Medium	Notes
n/a	First Brussels Agreement	1902	Table of harmonised monographs annexed to national pharmacopoeias	41 entries
n/a	Second Brussels Agreement	1925	Insertion of acronym "P.I." alongside monograph's titles in national pharmacopoeias	76 entries
1	First Edition	1951	Print	2 volumes plus supplement
2	Second Edition	1967	Print	
3	Third Edition	1979	Print	5 volumes
4	Fourth Edition	2006	Print or CD-ROM	2 volumes
5	Fifth Edition	2015	Online	
6	Sixth Edition	2016	Online	
7	Seventh Edition	2017	Online	
8	Eighth Edition	2018	Online	
9	Ninth Edition	2019	Online	
10	Tenth Edition	2020	Online	
11	Eleventh Edition	2022	Online	
12	Twelfth	2025	Online	

== See also ==
- Pharmacopoeia
- First International Pharmacopoeia Agreement (Brussels, 1902) and Second Agreement (Brussels, 1925)
- European Pharmacopoeia, another supranational pharmacopoeia
- Compounding
- Monograph
- Pharmaceutical formulation
- Global health
- World Health Organization
