= Iraqi Virtual Science Library =

The Iraqi Virtual Science Library is an Iraqi Virtual Library providing Iraqi academics with access to recourses via the internet. The library, launched in May 2006, initially provided access to more than one million articles from 17,000 electronic journals and other resources. Access to this knowledge is considered vital for the rebuilding of Iraq as it will improve the curriculum which suffered under Saddam Hussein's regime. The library is part of the overall plan to improve access to information in Iraq.

== Background ==
The library's creation was spearheaded by a group of American Association for the Advancement of Science (AAAS) fellows, including D.J. Patil, a scientist from the University of Maryland, College Park, in connection with JSTOR. According to Patil, Iraqi libraries have been looted while available texts in existing archives are out of date. The construction of a scientific library for the strife-torn country would have been expensive and time-consuming so the virtual library initiative was launched, making some 17,422 journal titles immediately available to Iraqi scientists and engineers.

The library was funded in part by the US Department of Defense. The National Academies of Science is also part of the collaboration.

The U.S. Civilian Research & Development Foundation (CRDF) has managed the Iraqi Virtual Science Library following its official launch in May 2006. It is part of its initiative to redirect human capital, particularly out of the weapons experts who found themselves out of work after the collapse of the Soviet Union, into entrepreneurial initiatives and collaboration. Continued funding has been provided by the US Department of State and the United States Department of Energy.

In 2008, the Iraqi Virtual Science Library was expanded to provide access to all public universities in Iraq and a handful of Iraqi Ministries that are key to reconstruction efforts and future development.

From 2010 to the present, the IVSL is managed and funded by Iraq's Ministry of Higher Education and Scientific Research. Digital databases such as Elsevier, JSTOR, Project Muse, and Springer, among others are partners.

== Participating Institutions ==
University of Anbar
Al-Mustansiriya University
Al Muthanna University
Al-Nahrain University
Al Qadissiya University
Babylon University
Baghdad University
Basrah University
Diyala University
University of Dohuk
Hawler Medical University - Kurdistan
The Islamic University, Baghdad
University of Karbala
Kirkuk University
University of Koya
Kufa University
University of Kurdistan - Hawler
Misan University
Mosul University
Salahaddin University
University of Sulaimani
Thi Qar University
Tikrit University
University of Technology, Iraq
Wasit University
Iraqi Academy of Science
Ministry of Environment (Iraq)
Ministry of Science and Technology (Iraq)
Ministry of Electricity (Iraq)
Ministry of Oil (Iraq)
Ministry of Agriculture (Iraq)
Ministry of Health (Iraq)
Ministry of Water Resources (Iraq)
Ministry of Higher Education and Scientific Research (Iraq)
Ministry of Municipalities and Public Works (Iraq)
