= List of law schools in Iraq =

This is a list of law schools in Iraq.

- Al-Mustansiriya University / College of Law
- Al-Nahrain University / College of Law
- Al Qadissiya University / College of Law
- Diyala University / College of Law
- Karbala University / College of Law
- Kirkuk University / College of Law
- Misan University / College of Law
- Salahaddin University / College of Law
- Thi Qar University / College of Law
- University of Anbar / College of Law
- University of Babylon / College of Law
- University of Baghdad / College of Law
- University of Basrah / College of Law
- University of Dohuk / College of Law
- University of Koya / College of Law
- University of Kufa / College of Law
- University of Kurdistan - Hawler / College of Law
- University of Mosul / College of Law
- University of Sulaimani / College of Law
- University of Tikrit / College of Law
- Wasit University / College of Law
