= List of medical colleges in Iraq =

There are many medical colleges in Iraq, The first medical school in Iraq was established in 1927. Most adopt the traditional subject-based curriculum. There are two colleges that adopted the problem-based curriculum, University of Kerbala College of Medicine and University of Tikrit College of Medicine. Increasingly, since 2012, colleges are either being established adopting the integrated curriculum or changing from subject-based curriculum.

There are 34 medical schools in Iraq, notably (arranged alphabetically according to university name):

- University of Anbar / College of Medicine, Al Anbar Governorate, Iraq;
- University of Babylon / College of Medicine, Babil Governorate, Iraq;
- University of Baghdad / College of Medicine, Baghdad, Iraq;
- University of Baghdad / Al-Kindy College of Medicine, Baghdad, Iraq;
- University of Basrah / Al-Zahraa College of Medicine, Basra, Iraq;
- University of Basrah / College of Medicine, Basra, Iraq;
- University of Diyala/ college of Medicine/Diyala;
- University of Duhok / College of Medicine, Dahuk Governorate, Iraq;
- Hawler Medical University / College of Medicine, Erbil;
- University of Kirkuk / Kirkuk College of Medicine, Kirkuk, Iraq;
- University of Kerbala / College of Medicine, Kerbala, Iraq;
- University of Koya / School of Medicine, Erbil Governorate, Iraq;
- University of Kufa / College of Medicine, Najaf, Iraq;
- Al-Iraqia University / college of Medicine, Baghdad, Iraq;
- University of Mosul / College of Medicine, Nineveh Governorate, Iraq;
- University of Mosul / Ninevah College of Medicine Nineveh Governorate, Iraq;
- Al-Mustansiriya University / College of Medicine, Baghdad, Iraq;
- Al-Nahrain University / College of Medicine, Baghdad, Iraq;
- University of Al-Qadisiyah / College of Medicine, Diwania, Iraq;
- University of Sulaimani / College of Medicine, Sulaimaniyah Governorate, Iraq;
- University of Thi-Qar / College of Medicine, Thi-Qar / Iraq;
- Tikrit University College of Medicine (TUCOM), Saladin Governorate, Iraq;
- University of Wasit / College of Medicine, Wasit Governorate, Iraq;
- University of Zakho / College of Medicine, Zakho, Iraq;
- University of Kurdistan Hewler / College of Medicine, Erbil, Iraq;
- University of Garmian / college of medicine, Sulaimaniyah Governorate, Iraq.
