= List of universities in Kurdistan Region =

This is a list of universities in Kurdistan Region

== Public universities ==
- University of Duhok, Duhok
- Duhok Polytechnic University, Duhok
- Erbil Polytechnic University, Erbil
- Hawler Medical University, Erbil
- University of Koya, Koya
- Charmo University, Chamchamal
- University of Raparin, Ranya
- University of Salahaddin, Erbil
- Soran University, Soran
- University of Sulaimani, Suliemani
- Sulaimani Polytechnic University SPU, Sulaimani
- University of Zakho, Zakho
- University of Halabja, Halabja
- University of Garmian, Kalar
- University of Kurdistan Hewlêr, Erbil

== Private universities ==
- American University of Iraq, Sulaimani, Sulaimani
- Catholic University in erbil, Erbil
- Qaiwan International University - UTM Franchise, Sulaimani
- Kurdistan Technical Institute, Sulaimani
- Komar University of Science and Technology, Sulaimani
- American University Duhok Kurdistan, Duhok
- Cihan University, Erbil
- Dijlah College, Erbil
- Ishik University, Erbil
- Ishik University, Sulaimani
- Cihan University, Sulaimani
- Lebanese French University, Erbil

British Royal University for Science and Technology, Erbil — the Ministry of Higher Education is disputing its name, and so degrees as of April 16, 2011, were illegal according to Ministry of High Education until the issue is resolved.

- زانکۆی ئەربیل / International University of Erbil, Newroz road (double side facing Erbil West Hospital), Erbil
- University of Human Development, Sulaimani
- Nawroz University, Dohuk
- Knowledge University, Erbil
- British International University, Erbil
