= Samarra University =

Public university in Samarra, Iraq

University of Samarra
- Type: Arabic-speaking
- Established: 2012 in Samarra
- Founders: Abdul Hamid Hussein Ahmed Al Daraji
- President: Sabah Allawi Khalaf
- Vice-president: Kamal Hussein Ahmed
- Academic staff: 338
- Students: 8,205
- Location: Samarra, Iraq
- Campus: urban
- Website: en.uosamarra.edu.iq

University of Samarra is an Iraqi public university that was officially established as a university in the beginning of 2012, after it had been affiliated to the University of Tikrit.

The beginnings of the university go back to 2000 when the Samarra College of Education was established as one of the colleges of Tikrit University. The study began in it in the same year with three departments: Arabic language, history and life sciences. In the 2003-2004 academic year, the Departments of Chemistry and Qur’anic Sciences were created, and later the English language departments, the Physical Education Department and the Geography Department were introduced, followed by postgraduate studies in the departments (Quranic Sciences - Arabic Language - History - Chemistry).

It was followed by three other colleges in Samarra affiliated to the University of Tikrit, which opened their doors in 2010: the College of Archeology and the College of Islamic Sciences, then in 2011 the College of Applied Sciences and the College of Engineering in 2012. It will also include the College of Industrial Pharmacy, which is under construction. These colleges are the daughters University of Samarra, whose foundation stone was laid on March 17, 2009.

The first president of the university was Abdul Hamid Hussein Ahmed Al-Daraji, who founded the university and then was retired due to the end of his service, followed by Abdul-Sattar Hussain Al-Jumaili, and then Musa Jassim Muhammad Al-Hamish.

== College departments ==
- Quran Sciences
- Arabic Language
- English Language
- Biology
- Chemistry
- Physics
- History
- Physical Education (suspended study in it after the establishment of the Faculty of Physical Education since the 2015-2016 academic year)
- Geography
- Archaeology

== See also ==
- List of universities in Iraq
