= Bushra Kasnazani =

Kurdish academic and writer

- بوشرا کەسنەزانی
- Born: Bushra Qadr Kaka Muhamad; 1986 (age 39–40); Sulaymaniyah, Ba'athist Iraq
- Occupations: Assistant professor; writer; scholar
- Writing career
- Pen name: Bushra Kasnazani
- Language: Sorani Kurdish
- Years active: 2000s–present
- Subjects: Kurdish literature; Literary criticism; Sufism
- Website: sites.google.com/a/univsul.edu.iq/bushra-qadr/home

Bushra Qadr Kaka Muhamad (Sorani Kurdish: بوشرا قادر کاکە موحەمەد), also known as Bushra Kasnazani (Sorani Kurdish: بوشرا کەسنەزانی), is an Iraqi-Kurdish writer, scholar and university lecturer at the University of Sulaimani.

== Early life and education ==
Kasnazani was born in 1986 in Sulaymaniyah, Ba'athist Iraq. She holds a PhD in narratology.

== Career ==
Kasnazani is an assistant professor in the University of Sulaimani, teaching in the Kurdish Department of the College of Languages.

=== Books ===
- The story of forty nights in the city of Qalandar (in Central Kurdish). 2025.
- Plot in Kurdish stories 1995-2005 (in Central Kurdish). 2021.
- Kurdish Poster Poetry and Japanese Haiku (in Central Kurdish). 2007.
- The Postman No Longer Knocks on the Door (in Central Kurdish). 2016.
- Classical Kurdish Poetry and Breaking Taboos (in Central Kurdish). 2019.
- The Beautiful Prophet and Khanita When They Were Still Here (in Central Kurdish).
- Dictionary of Piran About the Terminology of Sufism and Mysticism (in Central Kurdish). 2023.
- The Threshold of Tomorrow (in Central Kurdish). 2012.
- From the Moonlight of Poetry to Azadi Park (in Central Kurdish). 2013.
