= Ali Osman Ali =

Iraqi politician

- عەلی عوسمان عەلی

2nd Halabja Governor
- In office 25 August 2016 – 24 August 2018
- Preceded by: Abdullah Nawroli
- Succeeded by: Azad Tofiq

Deputy Minister for Trade
- Incumbent
- Assumed office 20 October 2020

Ali Osman Ali was governor of Halabja Province in Iraq. Graduated from College of Law, University of Sulaymaniyah, he was appointed governor of Halabja on 26 August 2016, and replaced with Azad Tofiq in an internal deal by his governing PUK political party on 24 August 2018. He is currently deputy minister of Ministry of Trade and Industry in the KRG.
