= Al Rasheed University College =

University in Baghdad, Iraq

Coordinates: 33°17′5″N 44°18′34″E

Al-Rasheed University College
- كلية الرشيد الجامعة
- Type: Private
- Established: 2005
- Dean: Dr. Suhael T.Anter
- Location: Baghdad, Iraq
- Website: www.alrasheedcol.edu.iq

Al Rasheed University College is a private Iraqi university established in Baghdad, Iraq.

== History ==
The university was founded in 2005 but was not recognised by the Ministry of Higher Education and Scientific Research of Iraq until 2010.

== See also ==
- List of universities in Iraq
