= Medical education in Iraq =

Medical education in Iraq is based on the 6-year British curriculum and is carried out in English. Medical education is free, and all required textbooks are provided free to students. Postgraduate residency training is required for both Iraqi and Arab board certification in each speciality. Before the Gulf War, the government funded subspecialty training abroad.

Academic physicians in Iraq, most of whom are specialists, are expected to publish their research in peer reviewed journals to be eligible for promotion to the highest levels. After United Nations sanctions were imposed in 1990, the delivery of European and American medical journals to Iraq abruptly stopped.

== Facilities ==
There are 34 colleges of medicine in Iraq, seven colleges of nursing, 10 colleges of dentistry and 8 colleges of pharmacy in addition to 6 technical colleges and 20 colleges of sciences which take the responsibility for supporting health care services and delivery.

== Iraqi doctors ==
US officials report that an estimated 8,000 Iraqi doctors stopped practicing medicine from 2003 to 2008 because doctors became targets for murder and kidnapping. US health officials say Iraq probably needs about 100,000 doctors to meet the needs of its population, but has only 15,000 now.

In 1994, hoping to prevent doctors from emigrating, the Iraqi government encouraged private medical practices. Four years later it allowed hospitals to charge some fees. The government also encouraged organizations including the Red Cross and the Red Crescent to build PHCs and help support hospitals.

== See also ==
- List of medical colleges in Iraq
