= Dijlah University College =

University in Iraq

Coordinates: 33°16′0″N 44°21′21″E

- كليــة دجلــة الجامعــة الاهليــة
- Type: General University
- Established: 2004
- Location: Baghdad/Al Dora/ Al Masafi street , Baghdad, Iraq
- Website: www.duc.edu.iq

Dijlah University College is a general university in Iraq. The university was founded in Baghdad according to decree No. 3322, issued by the Ministry of Higher Education and Scientific Research on 27 October 2004 in accordance with the law establishing private colleges and universities No. 13 of 1996.

== Departments ==
- Department of Computer Techniques Engineering
- Department of Refrigeration and Air conditioning Techniques Engineering
- Department of Building and Construction Engineering
- Department of Computer Sciences
- Department of Optics Techniques
- Department of Media
- Department of Analysis
- Department of Business Administration
- Department of Arabic Language
- Department of Law
- Department of Dentistry
- Department of Finance and Banking

== See also ==
- List of universities in Iraq
