= Nareen Shammo =

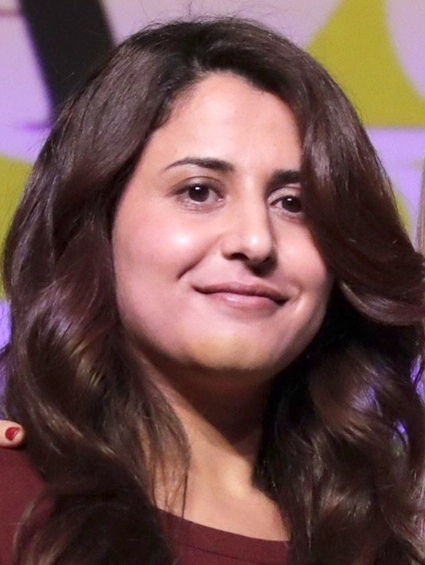
Nareen Shammo in Madrid in 2017.

Nareen Shammo (born 1986 in Bashiqa, Iraq) is a Yazidi investigative journalist and a human rights defender.

== Life ==
She studied English literature at the Al-Hadba University of Mosul, has worked as a journalist and TV producer for 9 years, and currently campaigns for the rights of Yazidi women.

== Activism ==
In 2014 Nareen Shammo quit her TV job when she learnt that Islamic State was systematically kidnapping and enslaving women and girls in Iraq and became active in the liberation of captive Yazidi girls and women and in denouncing the genocide of Yazidis. She has worked with the Initiative for Ezidis around the world and the Yazda Center. She has been chosen in 2015 between 100 inspiring women in the world by BBC, and 2016 by Salt and Diageo's.

She was the first to speak out about the abuses against Yazidi women before the Kurdistan Region and call for their intervention.

In 2015, Nareen Shammo was awarded the Clara Zetkin Women's Prize (Clara-Zetkin-Frauenpreis) of the German Die Linke party, for her outstanding work.

Nareen Shammo played a key role in bringing Nadia Murad's to the international community. On 24 November 2015, in Geneva, Shammo accompanied Murad to the United Nations Forum on Minority Issues in Geneva, where Murad addressed representatives of states, human rights activists and international organisations about the atrocities committed against the Yazidis by ISIS. Shammo helped prepare and rehearse Murad's speech in preparation for her first public testimony at the United Nations.. Shammo was among the first to recognise Nadia Murad's potential to become a leading international voice for the Yazidi cause and for women and girls who had survived ISIS atrocities.
