= Faleeha Hassan =

Iraqi poet living in New Jersey (born 1967)

Faleeha Hassan (born 1967) is an Iraqi poet living in New Jersey.

== Early life and education ==
Hassan was born and raised in Najaf. She was a precocious reader as a child, but her schooling was interrupted in 1980 when her middle school was closed for the Iran–Iraq War. She would eventually earn a masters in Arabic Literature from the University of Kufa in 2006.

== Career ==
Hassan began teaching high school in 1988.

In 1991, she became the first woman in Najaf to publish a book of poetry, titled Because I Am a Girl.

In 2012, she became the first woman in Iraq to publish a book of poetry for children, "A Dream Guard."

She fled Iraq after her name appeared on a militant group's death list in 2011. She fled first to Eskişehir in Turkey, then to Afyonkarahisar, where she insisted her children be allowed to attend school in order to stay warm. After working with the United Nations office in Ankara, she was accepted into the United States by a Roman Catholic charity. She moved into New Jersey in 2012.

== Awards and honours ==
- World Association of Arab Translators and Linguists (WATA)
- The Najafi Creative Festival for 2012
- The Prize of Naziq al-Malaika 2008
- The Prize of al-Mu'temar for poetry 2010
- The short-story prize of the Shaheed al-Mihrab Foundation
- Srbrun Poveilu Silver Medal from Mesopotamia cultural center Belgrade– Serbia 2018
- Pulitzer Prize Nomination 2018 for Breakfast for Butterflies
- Pushcart Prize Nomination 2018
- Pushcart Prize Nomination 2019

== Books ==
- Because I Am a Girl (1991)
- A Visit to the Museum of the Shadows (1998)
- Five addresses for my friend the sea (2000)
- Even after while (2008)
- Splinters(2008)
- Lack of the Happiness Cells (2008)
- Mom's Poems(2010)
- Water Freckles (2010)
- A Dream guard (2012)
- I Hate My City (2013)
- Let's Strongly Celebrate My Day (2015)
- If Columbus did not discover America (2015)
- SWALLOW (2016)
- We grow up at speed of war (2016)
- Lipstick (2016)
- Mass Graves (2018)
- When I drink tea in a New Jersey (2018)
- Breakfast for Butterflies (2019)
- A Butterfly's Voice (2020)
- War and Me (2022)
