= University of Al-Qadisiyah =

Public university in Al Diwaniyah, Iraq

Coordinates: 32°0′2″N 44°52′43″E

- جامعة القادسيـــة
- University of Al-Qadisiyah official seal
- Motto: Arabic: وقل ربي زدني علما
- Motto in English: My Lord Giveth Thy Knowledge
- Type: Public - Research
- Established: 1987
- Parent institution: Ministry of Higher Education and Scientific Research
- President: Ehsan Kathem
- Vice-president: Adel Turki Al-Delwi
- Provost: Firdous Abbas Jaber
- Academic staff: 2 645
- Students: 21 154
- Undergraduates: 20 497
- Postgraduates: 657
- Location: Al Diwaniyah, Al-Qādisiyyah, Iraq
- Campus: Urban 371 acres (150 ha) (Main/University Campus) 998 acres (404 ha) (Veterinary Campus) 12 acres (4.9 ha) (Medical/Nursing Campus)
- Language: Arabic, English
- Colors: Sapphire Blue & Air Superiority Blue Q U
- Website: qu.edu.iq

The University of Al-Qadisiyah (Arabic: جامعة القادسية) is an Iraqi university established in 1987 in Al Diwaniyah, Qadisiyyah Province, Iraq.

== History ==
The University of Al-Qadisiyah was established on 23 December 1987 through a resolution (no. 159) passed by the Revolutionary Command Council of the Saddam era. The resolution ordered the establishment of four universities; the University of Al-Qadisiyah, the University of Kufa, the University of Tikrit, and the University of Anbar. Originally, the University of Al-Qadisiyah began with two colleges; the College of Education and the College of Business and Administration. There has been a vast increase in this number though, as today, the university encompasses 18 colleges in addition to a number of learning centers.

== Academic profile ==
The university consists of 18 academic schools or colleges:

- College of Medicine
- College of Engineering
- College of Computer Science and Information Technology
- College of Science
- College of Veterinary Medicine
- College of Education for women
- College of Agriculture
- School of Law
- College of Education
- College of Arts
- College of Management and Economics
- College of Physical Education
- College of Pharmacy
- College of Nursing
- College of Dentistry
- College of Fine Arts
- College of Biotechnology
- College of Archaeology

=== International collaborations ===
The university signed a memorandum of understanding with Durham University, UK, in 2023 to develop capacity in heritage protection, including training of the university's staff and students in archaeological surveying and lab techniques by Durham's Department of Archaeology. As part of this collaboration, researchers ad Al-Qadisiyah and Durham pinpointed the location of the Battle of al-Qadisiyyah using declassified US spy satellite images.

== Campuses ==
Al-Qadisiyah is located between a strict conservative society to the west (the holy cities of Najaf and Karbala), and the more liberal alternative to the north (Hilla, and Baghdad). The result is a mix between conservative and liberal styling in campus planning and student life. The main campus is located on the north-western edge of the city of Diwaniya. The majority of the university's colleges along with the main administrative building are found here.

College of Medicine. View of northern half of campus from the pathology labs.

In addition to the main campus, there are smaller campuses sprawled in and around the city of Diwaniya:

- Medicine & Nursing Campus @ Diwaniya Teaching Hospital
- Law Campus across from the Provincial Government Building
- Engineering campus located across from the main train station
- Education campus located near the College of Engineering
- Veterinary campus located on the northern edge of the city for better access to farms

== See also ==
- List of Islamic educational institutions
- List of universities in Iraq
