= Saad Maan =

Iraqi military officer (born 1972)

- سعد معن ابراهيم جاسم الموسوي
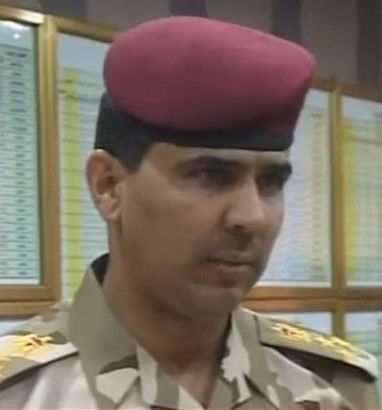
- Maan in 2014
- Born: Saad Maan Ibrahim Jassim al-Musawi; 4 August 1972 (age 54); Baghdad, Iraq
- Military career
- Allegiance: Iraq
- Branch: Iraqi Army; Ministry of Interior (Iraq)
- Service years: 1995-present
- Rank: Major General

Major General Saad Maan Ibrahim Jassim al-Musawi (Arabic: سعد معن إبراهيم جاسم الموسوي; born 4 August 1972) is a senior Iraqi Ground Forces officer serving as the Director of the Department of Relations and Information.

== Education ==
- Bachelor of Arts English language - Al Turath University College - Baghdad 1994
- Police Sciences High Diploma, High Institute of Internal Security officers- Baghdad 1995
- Bachelor, Media, Media College, University of Baghdad 2001
- Master, Media, College of Media, University of Baghdad, a thesis entitled " Media Monitoring and Democratization in Iraq" 2007
- Ph.D. Media, College of Media, Baghdad University, a dissertation entitled "The role of Television in Spreading the Culture of Human Rights, A Survey for Prisoners in Iraqi Prisons" 2011

== Posts ==
- Secretary of the Minister of Interior, Ministry of Interior, Minister Office 2003 - 2004
- Secretary of the Inspector General, Ministry of Interior 2004 - 2005
- Director of the Office of Information and Public Relations, Ministry of Interior, Inspector General Office 2005 - 2006
- Foreign relations officer Ministry of Interior, Directorate of Interior Affairs 2006
- Officer of Planning and Statistics, General Directorate of Traffic, Ministry of Interior 2007
- Human Rights Officer, General Directorate of Internal Affairs and Security, South Office 2007
- Associate Director of the Department of Human Rights, Ministry of Interior 2007
- Director of Media Department of General Directorate of Interior Affaires and Security on 2008, in addition to his duties in the Department of Human Rights.
- Director of the Department of Media, Ministry of Interior 2011 - 2018.
- Director of Relations and Information Office, Ministry of Interior 2018–2023.
- Minister of Interior adviser 2023-2025.
- Head of the Iraqi Security Media Cell (January 2025)

== See also ==
- Ministry of Interior (Iraq)
