= International University of Erbil =

University in the Kurdistan Region, Iraq

- جامعة اربيل الدولية
- Other names: زانكۆی ئه‌ربیلی نێوده‌وڵه‌تی
- Former names: Sabis University
- Type: English-speaking institution
- Established: 2009
- Location: Arbil, Kurdistan Region, Iraq
- Campus: Urban
- Website: www.ue.edu.krd

The International University of Erbil (Arabic: جامعة اربيل الدولية) is an educational institution in Erbil, the flourishing capital of the Kurdistan Region, Iraq. It was established in 2009 after being restructured and named into a new entity. The university has a former name called Sabis University founded in 2007. The university obtained full accreditation (Letter no. 6171 dated on 30 August 2017) from the Iraqi Ministry of Higher Education and Scientific Research In Baghdad

== Departments ==
=== Engineering, Business and Management ===
==== Engineering ====
- civil engineering Department
- Department of Computer and Communications Engineering
- Department of Electrical Engineering
- Mechanical Engineering Department

==== Business and Management ====
- Department of General Administration
- Department of Accounting
- Department of Management Information Systems
- Marketing department
- Banking and Financial Services Department
- Tourism and Hospitality Department

=== Sciences ===
- Biology department with two sections, Medical Microbiology and General Biology
- Chemistry department with two sections, Biochemical Analysis and General Chemistry
- Physics department
- Department of Mathematics and Information Technology
- Department of Mathematics and Science
- Department of Information Technology

== See also ==
- List of universities in Iraq
