= Islamic University College =

Private university in Najaf, Iraq

Islamic University College is a private university established in 2004 in Najaf, Iraq. The university was established in 2004 by Sadiruldeen Al-Gubanchi. The university currently enrolls approximately 7000 students. The college is recognized by the Iraqi Ministry of Higher Education and Scientific Research.

== History ==
The University Islamic College obtained official recognition and a foundation license from the Ministry of Higher Education and Scientific Research, according to its book No. And private colleges No. (13) for the year 1996. The college was also granted a foundation license from the General Secretariat of the Council of Ministers in the name of (The Islamic University College in Najaf) in its letter No. 331906 on 5/11/2009 approved by Cabinet Resolution No. 381 of 2009.

== Departments ==
The college awards Bachelor degrees in its various departments. Departments include:

- Law
- Political and International Sciences
- Quranic and Linguistic Studies
- Islamic Doctrine
- Media
- Technology of Computer Engineering
- Technology of Air Conditioning Engineering

== See also ==
- List of universities in Iraq
