= University of Halabja =

Public university in Iraqi Kurdistan

Coordinates: 35.1729°N 46.0229°E

Halabja University زانكۆى هه‌ڵه‌بجه‌
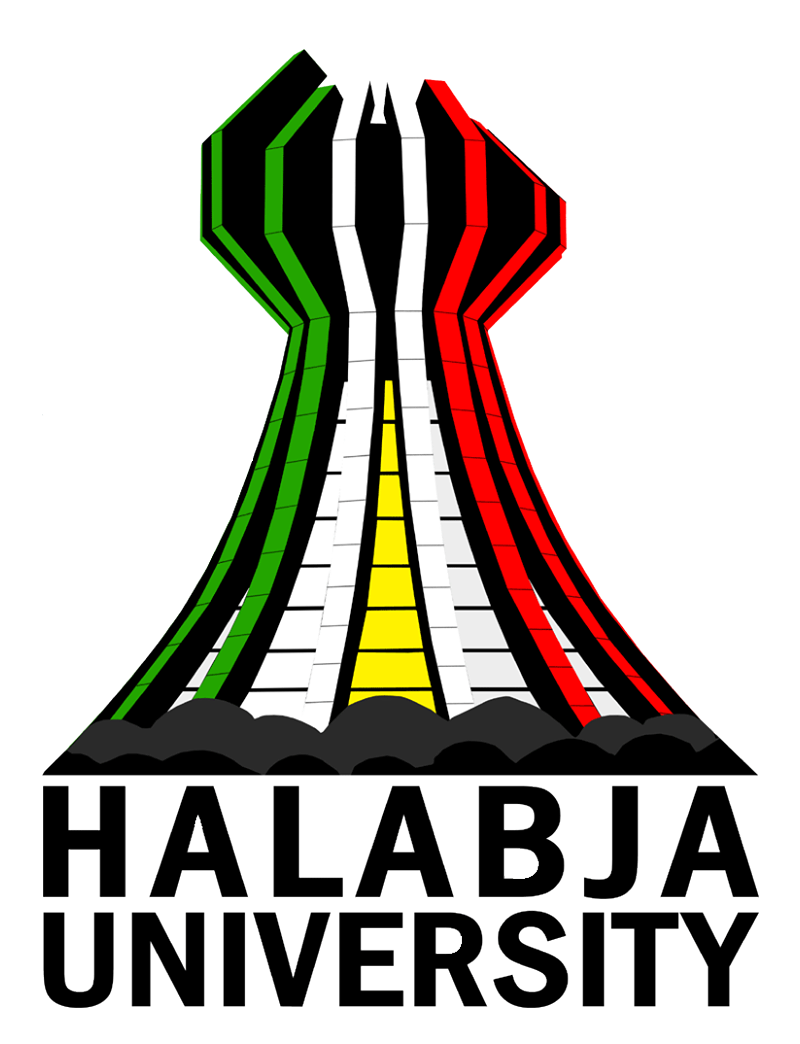
- Type: Public
- Established: 2011
- Chairman: Dr. Bamo Parwez Aziz
- Chancellor: Dana Abdullah Tahir
- Location: Halabja, Iraqi Kurdistan, Iraq
- Website: uoh.edu.iq

The University of Halabja, orUoH (زانكۆى هه‌ڵه‌بجه‌ in Kurdish) is one of the Iraqi Kurdistan public universities founded in 2011 in the city of Halabja, Halabja Governorate. The university offers a variety of programs such as human sciences, law, physical education, engineering, sciences. Programs last for four years and students receive BA degrees in their corresponding fields at the end of the fourth year. the university campus is situated in Halabja and the college of Education in Sharazoor District. The first president of Halabja University was Dr. Khasraw Abdulla Ali. The current president is Dr. Mahabad Kamil Abdullah

== History ==
Prior to 2010, Halabja had a faculty, "Faculty of Basic Education" which was part of and affiliated by University of Sulaimani. Then on July 8, 2010, during the six cabinet of Kurdistan Regional Government, the KRG Council of Ministers issued resolution No. 1670 thereby declaring state University of Halabja and thus, Faculty of Basic Education departed from University of Sulaimani and became part of University of Halabja. In February 2011, Presidency of Halabja University started working with Assistant Professor, Khasraw Adbulla Ali being the head of it.

== Colleges ==
Halabja University has the following colleges from which students receive BA degrees in varies fields of study:

=== College of Basic Education ===
1. Department of English Language
2. Department of Arabic Language
3. Department of Social Sciences

=== College of Humanities ===
1. Department of History
2. Department Principles of Religion
3. Department of Geography
4. Department of Media

=== College of Sciences ===
1. Department of Physics
2. Department of Computer Science

=== College of Physical Education and Sport Sciences ===
1. Department of Physical Education

=== College of Engineering ===
1. Department of Civil Engineering
2. Department of Electrical & Electronic Engineering

=== College of Law and Administration ===
1. Department of Law
2. Department of International Trade
3. Department of Politics and International Relations

=== College of Education of Sharazoor ===
1. Department of Kurdish Language
2. Department of Kindergarten
3. Department of Human Development

== Administration ==
University of Halabja has three main offices - President Office, Vice President Office for Financial and Administrative Affairs and Vice President for Scientific Affairs - which affiliate 15 administrative divisions called "directorates" that work collaboratively to undertake different works of the university and are under the auspices of University of Halabja Presidency. University of Halabja has the following directorates:

1. Directorate of Personnel: deals with employment and employee affairs. It is divided into dossier, archive and personnel chambers.
2. Directorate of Audit: audits expenses, accountancy registrations and bill of quantities of the university projects.
3. Directorate of Finance: manages university expenses, estimation and approval of budget. It is divided into expenses, accounting and salary chambers.
4. Directorate of Legal Affairs: holds public auctions and tenders, forms investigation committees, arranges contracts and receives pledges and bails from admitted students.
5. Directorate of Administration: forms and supervises committees for the university vehicles and buildings maintenance, manages electricity related works and implements other services.
6. Directorate of Statistics & Information Technology: collects information about students and employees and organizes it statistically, also doing IT affairs of the University.
7. Directorate of Career Development: deals with the employment of graduates by creating connection with private companies and presents seminars for related matters.
8. Directorate of International Academic Relations: encourages, guides, enables and finds innovative ways to make an academic connection between University of Halabja and other academic institutions across the world. It also manages academic works on regional level such as letters of support, invitation, confirmation, proof of staff employment, etc. It administrates IT and Media chambers.
9. Directorate of Store & Supply: deals with registration of all kinds of instruments either bought or donated, investigation of lost equipment and supervision of equipment storage.
10. Directorate of Registration deals with duties related to student enrollment and education process.
11. Directorate of Student Affairs: manages and supervises halls of residence for the university students and provides them with all necessary means and equipment.
12. Directorate of Health and Safety: warns students, employees and teachers of risks, hazards or dangers that threaten their health and safety.
13. Directorate of Quality Assurance: supervises programs on the level of university’s scientific departments, course book preparation, teacher's feedback, evaluation of teacher questions and teaching methods.
14. Directorate of Engineering and Projects: manages all sorts of work related to engineering and projects and keeps a close watch on private companies that implement engineering projects for the university.

== Key Staff ==
The following are the key staff members of University of Halabja.

- Dr. Mahabad Kamil Abdullah , University President
- Dr. Dana Abdullah Tahir, Vice-president for scientific affairs
- Dr. Sirwan Hamid Ahmed, Vice-president for administration & financial affairs
- Dr. Ranjdar Mohammed Aziz, Vice-president for Student affairs
- Dr. Jalal Ahmed Khdir, dean of College of Physical Education and Sport Sciences
- Dr. Nariman Abdulla Ali, dean of College of Humanities
- Dr. Hussain Mohammed Salih, dean of College of Basic Education
- Dr. Sarkew Salah Abdulkareem, dean of College of Science
- Dr. Sirwan Hamid Ahmed, dean of College of Law and Administration
- Dr. Amed Mohamed Rashid Mira, dean of College of Education of Sharazoor

== International Activities ==
University of Halabja is one of the four Iraqi Kurdistan public university partners of the European Union Erasmus Mundus MARHABA Program, the others being Koya, Sulaimani, and Raparin universities. The objective of MARHABA project directly corresponds to the development of further collaboration among EU and Asian Institutions for sending and hosting mobility of talented students and staff, enhancement capacity, transparency and employability as well as skills and qualification of institutions and individuals.

== Halabja ==
Halabja is a Kurdish city located about 240 km north-east of the Iraqi capital Baghdad and 14 km from the Iran-Iraq border. It is the capital of the Halabja Governorate which was announced in 2014 making it the fourth governorate in Kurdistan Region. It has a population of 117,000.

Because of the hospitality of its people, geographical border with Iran, and stunning scenery of lakes and mountains, Halabja province is considered one of the most beautiful and fascinating areas in the Kurdistan region. Halabja is surrounded by a range of spectacular mountains including steep and snowy-covered Hawraman range from north, Shnrwe range from east and Balambo range from south. Halabja was named “the capital of peace” in September 2014 for its sacrifices for the Kurdish cause.

== Official Website ==
- University of Halabja
