= University of Al-Ma'mun =

Private college in Baghdad, Iraq

Coordinates: 33.3377°N 44.3398°E

AL-Ma'moon University College
- كلية المأمون الجامعة
- Type: Private University
- Established: 23 April 1990; 36 years ago
- President: Dr. Abdul-Jalil Abdul-Wahid Omran
- Location: Baghdad, Iraq
- Campus: Urban
- Website: University of Al-Ma'mun

Al-Ma'mun University College (Arabic: كلية المأمون الجامعة) is a private college in Baghdad, Iraq. It was founded on 23 April 1990, and it is one of the oldest private universities in Iraq.

== See also ==
- List of universities in Iraq
