= Baghdad College for Economic Sciences University =

Private university in Baghdad, Iraq

Coordinates: 33°20′27″N 44°20′5″E

Al-Iraqia Science University (Baghdad College of Economic Sciences University (formally))
- جامعة العلوم العراقية (كلية بغداد للعلوم الاقتصادية الجامعة سابقا)
- Type: Private university
- Established: 1996
- Location: Baghdad, Iraq

Al-Iraqia Science University is a private Iraqi university established in 1996 in Baghdad, Iraq.

== See also ==
- Private universities in Iraq
