= Al Mansour University College =

Private university in Baghdad, Iraq

Coordinates: 33°18′54″N 44°25′42″E

Al-Mansour University College
- كلية المنصور الجامعة
- Former names: MUC
- Type: Private
- Established: 1988
- Dean: Prof. Sabah Kallow
- Location: Baghdad, Al-Rusafa, Iraq
- Publication: Al-Mansour Magazine
- Colors: blue
- Website: www.muc.edu.iq

Al-Mansour University College is a private Iraqi university established in 1988 in Baghdad, Iraq.

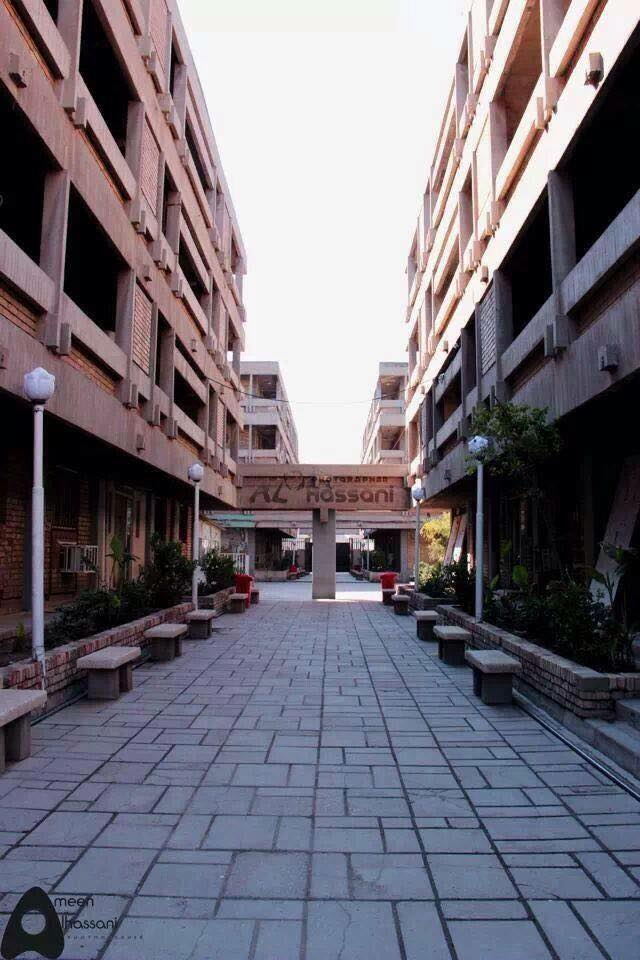
center of the college

== Faculties ==
Al-Mansour University College (MUC) consists of the following Departments:

- Civil Engineering Department
- Communications Engineering Department
- Computer Technology Engineering Department
- Computer Engineering Department
- Computer Science & Information Systems Department
- Business Administration Department
- Accounting & Banking Department
- Law Department
- English Department
- Medical Instrumentation Engineering Department
- Physical Therapy Department
- Digital Media Department

== See also ==
- List of universities in Iraq
