= Basrah University College of Science and Technology =

University in Basra, Iraq

Coordinates: 30.4971°N 47.8287°E

- كلية البصرة الجامعة للعلوم والتكنولوجيا
- Type: Private
- Established: 2015
- Students: 200
- Location: Basrah, Iraq
- Campus: Urban
- Website: uobasrah.edu.iq

The Basrah University College of Science and Technology (Arabic: كلية البصرة الجامعة للعلوم والتكنولوجيا) is a university college located in south of Iraq Basra, Iraq. It consists of three departments: Information and Communication Engineering, Business Administration and English Department.

== See also ==
- List of universities in Iraq
