= Baghdad College of Medical Sciences =

University in Baghdad, Iraq

Coordinates: 33.3497143°N 44.382707°E

- Type: Private
- Established: 2000
- Dean: Haider Al_tukmaji
- Location: Baghdad, Baghdad Governorate, Iraq
- Website: bcms.edu.iq

Baghdad College of Medical Sciences is a private Iraqi university established by the Iraqi Pharmacists Syndicate in accordance to the law and regulations of Ministry of Higher Education and scientific research (MOHE) governing the establishment and administration of private universities and colleges. The college is specified that it is a special scientific establishment with a general benefit, and it has its financial and administrative independence and it enjoys all the rights and specifications that are listed in the law. The license to establish the college was granted on 14 September 2000.

== Departments ==
The college has two departments:

- The Department of Pharmacy
- the Department of Nursing

== About ==
The college is a non-profit scientific organization directly supervised by the Ministry of Higher Education & Scientific Research (MOHE), dedicated to graduate pharmacy students who are well trained and educated in all pharmaceutical fields. The focus of teaching and training is on clinical and industrial pharmacy as well as community pharmacy. The college maintains a 30 permanent academic staff with PhD and MSc. degrees in various pharmaceutical disciplines. In addition, visiting professors & instructors from public pharmacy and medical colleges contribute to the academic activities in the college. The college inaugurated its first graduate group of 71 graduates in the academic year 2004-2005.

The period of study at the college is 5 years. The college follows the seasonal semester system where the academic year is made up of 2 independent semester courses. This system is accredited by the MOHE for all pharmacy colleges in Iraq.

In 2018 the nursing department was established, and the name of the collage has changed from Baghdad College of Pharmacy to Baghdad College of Medical Sciences. The study duration in the nursing department is four years, and graduates are granted a Bachelor of Science in Nursing.

The college's future plan is to start postgraduate studies. Moreover, the college is concentrating on continuous training and education of post-career pharmacists. Short courses in specialized topics are regularly offered for practicing pharmacists. The college future plan to be a medical university with a teaching hospital and a facility for quality control of the produce of Iraqi pharmaceuticals and testing the coming medicine and their active ingredients by establishing a well equipped quality control labs with all 5 departments and prepared itself for post graduate study. The college plans to start continuous education in pharmacy science to graduate pharmacist in all field of their profession.

== See also ==
- List of universities in Iraq
