= Madenat Alelem University College =

Private university in Baghdad, Iraq

Coordinates: 33°22′43″N 44°20′9″E

- كليــة مدينــة العلــم الجامعــة
- Type: Private
- Established: 2005
- Dean: Professor Shaker Mahmoud Al-juboori
- Location: Kadhimiya, Baghdad, Iraq
- Website: www.made natalelem.com

Madenat Alelem University College or Science City University College is a private Iraqi university established in 2005 in Baghdad, Iraq.

== See also ==
- Private universities in Iraq
