= Shatt Al-Arab University =

University in Iraq

Coordinates: 30°32′39″N 47°47′18″E

- جامعة شــط العرب
- Type: Private
- Established: 1993
- Location: Basra, Iraq
- Website: sa-uc.edu.iq

Shatt Al-Arab University College is a private Iraqi university established in 1993 in Basrah in the south of Iraq.

== Faculties ==
- College of Science

     Computer science
     Pathological Analysis Sciences

- College of Law

     Law Department

- College of Engineering Technical College

     Fuel and Energy Engineering Technology
     Computer Engineering Technology
     Biomedical Engineering Technology
     Laser and Optoelectronics Engineering Technology
     Power Mechanics Engineering Technology

- College of Engineering

     Civil Engineering
     Oil and Gas engineering

- College of Arts

     English language department
     Translation Department

- College of Administration and Economics

     Business Administration
     Accounting
     Financial and Banking sciences
     Oil and Gas Management and Marketing

- College of Health and Medical Technologies

     Radiation techniques

The university began its academic journey with the establishment of "Shatt al-Arab University College" in Basra Governorate on October 5, 1993, pursuant to Order No. (MF/568). Upon its founding, the college comprised only four departments. The college is recognized by the Ministry of Higher Education and Scientific Research. It is one of the oldest private colleges in Basra Governorate and the fifth in Iraq.

The college aims to raise the scientific and cultural level in Iraq in general, and in Basra in particular, by providing the labor market in both the public and private sectors with distinguished scientific competencies and expertise from its graduates.

Since its founding, Shatt al-Arab College has undergone several stages of development until it was transformed into "Shatt al-Arab University" pursuant to Ministerial Order No. (T H AK/16006) dated July 28, 2024, marking the beginning of a new phase of progress on the scientific and urban levels.

The university currently comprises seven colleges, encompassing seventeen academic departments in two main camps, and is working to establish new departments in the coming years to keep pace with labor market demands and modern academic developments.

== See also ==
- Private universities in Iraq

- Shatt Al-Arab University has two scientific journals:

- Iraqi Journal of Intelligent Computing and Informatics (IJICI):
- Journal of Shatt Al-Arab University College for Administrative and Legal Sciences:

- Official Website:

- Official Instagram:
