= Lebanese French University =

Private university in Erbil, Iraq

- Former names: Business and Management University (BMU)
- Type: Private
- Established: 2007
- President: Prof. Dr. Abdulqader Azeez Al-Naqshabandi
- Location: Erbil, Iraqi Kurdistan, Iraq; 36.1710°N 43.9543°E
- Campus: Urban
- Website: Official website

The Lebanese French University (LFU) is a private university. It was licensed in September 2007 by the Kurdistan Regional Government - Erbil (decree 2342). It operates on its 50,000 m^{2} (540,000 sq ft) Erbil campus, 100 m (330 ft) street, near Mosul road, Nasr Roundabout.

LFU has a complex for student accommodation. The university offers undergraduate degrees in Law, Business Administration, Accounting and Finance, Computer Engineering, Computer Networking, Information Technology, English Language, French Language, Legal Administration, General Education, Marketing, Diplomacy, International Relations, and Fine Arts. It also offers postgraduate degrees in Business Administration, Accounting and Finance, and Information Technology.

LFU is an associate member of the Association of Arab Universities Union (AAU).

== See also ==
- List of universities in Iraq
