= List of universities in Iraq =

This is an incomplete list of universities in Iraq. There are more than 85 universities and academics in total: 35 public universities, (four technical universities, one institutes of technology, and two fine arts university, one national defense university, and one police academy) 45 private universities and colleges.

== Baghdad ==
- University of Baghdad
- Al Mustansiriya University
- University of Technology
- Middle Technical University
- Nahrain University
- Al Turath University College
- Iraqi University
- University of Information Technology and Communications
- Al-Esraa University
- American University of Iraq

== Outside Baghdad ==
- Al Muthana University - Al Muthanna
- Babylon University - Babil
- Diyala University - Diyala
- Kirkuk University - Kirkuk
- Kufa University - Najaf
- Misan University - Misan
- Dhi Qar University - Dhi Qar
- Tikrit University - Salah ad Din
- University of Al-Qadisiyah - Al-Qādisiyyah
- University of Anbar - Anbar
- University of Basrah - Basrah
- University of Karbala - Karbala
- University of Mosul - Mosul
- University of Wasit - Wasit
- Samarra University - Samarra
- Al-Hadba University - Mosul
- Northern Technical University - Mosul
- Southern Technical University - Basrah
- University of Al-Ameed - Karbala
- Al-Qasim Green University - Babil
- Al-furat Al-awsat Technical University - Najaf

== Kurdistan Region ==
- University of Sulaimani
- Salahaddin University- Erbil
- University of Duhok
- Duhok Polytechnic University
- Erbil polytechnic university
- Sulaimani Polytechnic University
- Hawler Medical University
- Koya University
- Soran University
- University of Zakho
- University of Raparin
- Halabja University
- Garmian University
- Charmo University
- University of Kurdistan Hawler
- The American University of Kurdistan
- Kurdistan Institution for Strategic Studies and Scientific Research
- Kurdistan Board for Medical Specialties

== Private universities ==
- Shatt Al-Arab University - Basra
- Knowledge University - Erbil
- Al-Subtain University - Karbala
- Cihan university - Erbil, Sulaymaniyah & Duhok
- Catholic University in Erbil - Erbil
- Ahlulbait University College - Karbala
- Al Hadba University - Mosul
- Al Maamoon University College - Baghdad
- Al Maarif University College - Al-Anbar
- Al Mansour University College - Baghdad
- Al Rafidain University College - Baghdad
- Al Rasheed University College - Baghdad
- Al Turath University College - Baghdad
- Al Yarmouk University College - Diyala
- Baghdad College of Economic Sciences University - Baghdad
- Baghdad College Of Medical Sciences - Baghdad
- Basrah University College of Science and Technology - Basra
- Lebanese French University - Erbil
- International University of Erbil
- Dijlah University College - Baghdad
- Humanitarian Studies University College - Najaf
- Islamic University College - Najaf
- Madenat Alelem University College - Baghdad
- St. Clements University - Sulaimaniyah
- Tishk International University - Erbil
