= Al Yarmouk University College =

Iraqi university

Coordinates: 33°18′0″N 44°26′40″E

Al-Yarmouk University College
- كليـة اليرمـوك الجامعـة
- Type: Private
- Established: 1996
- President: Ali Z. Nema
- Location: Baghdad, Iraq
- Website: https://al-yarmok.edu.iq

Al Yarmouk University College is a private Iraqi university established in 1996 in Diyala and the Medical Departments lie in Baghdad, Iraq.

== Faculties ==
- Dentistry
- Pharmacy
- Computer Engineering Techniques
- Computer Science
- Pathological Analysis Techniques
- English Language
- Arabic Language
- Law

== See also ==
- List of universities in Iraq
