= University of Information Technology and Communications =

University of Information Technology and Communications (UoITC)
- Type: Public
- Established: 2014
- Location: Baghdad, Iraq
- Website: https://uoitc.edu.iq/

The University of Information Technology and Communications (UoITC) is an Iraqi public university located in the city of Baghdad. It is considered the first university dedicated to Information technology and communication in Iraq. It was established by the Iraqi Ministry of Higher Education in 2014 as the first Iraqi university to specialize in information technology and communications. The university was ranked 17 among public universities in the Iraqi national ranking in 2023 and 39 by uniRank website.

== Colleges and Research centers ==
- College of Business informatics: currently has 2 departments.
  - Business Information Technology department
  - Informatics Systems Management department
- College of Engineering: currently has 2 departments.
  - Media Technology and Communications Engineering Department
  - Mobile Communications and Computing Engineering Department
- College of Biomedical Informatics: currently has 2 departments.
  - Intelligent Medical Systems Department
  - Bio Informatics Department
- Center of continuing education
- Electronic computer center

== See also ==
- List of universities in Iraq
