= Cihan University (Erbil) =

University in Arbil, Kurdistan Region, Iraq

Coordinates: 36.1728°N 43.9658°E

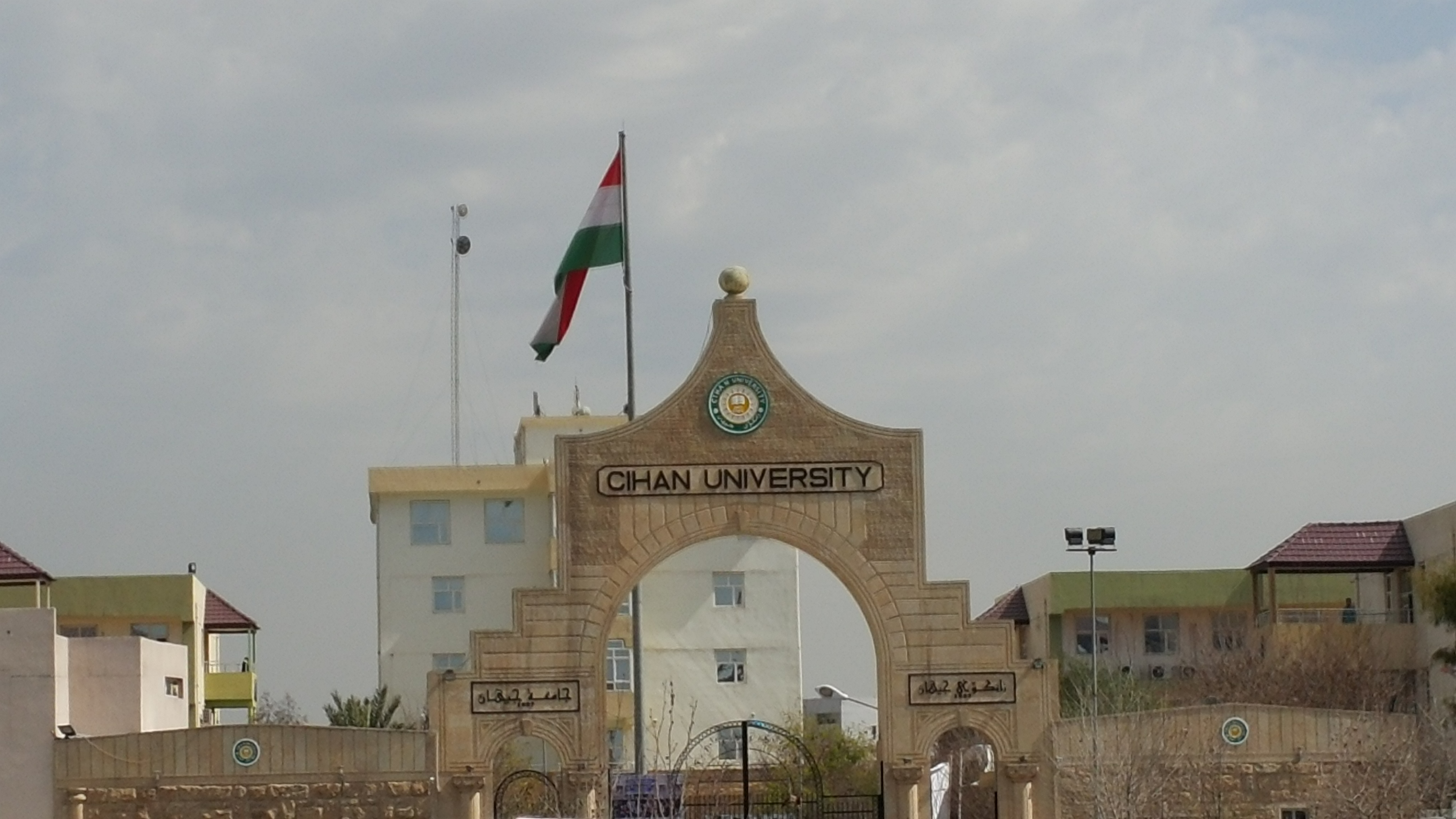
- Type: English-speaking institution
- Established: 2007 in Erbil
- Founder: Dr. Nawzad Bajger
- President: Dr. Amjad Sabir Dalwai
- Undergraduates: 18000
- Location: Arbil, Kurdistan Region, Iraq
- Campus: Urban
- Colors: Dark Red
- Website: cihanuniversity.edu.iq

Cihan University (Kurdish: زانكۆى جیهان, Arabic: جامعة جيهان) is an educational institution in Erbil, capital of the autonomous Kurdistan Region of Iraq. It was established in 2007 by the A University Company for Scientific Investment which is a part of Cihan Group. Cihan is the first private university in the Kurdistan Region. It is accredited by the Ministry of Higher Education and Scientific Research of Kurdistan, and is a member of the Association of Arab Universities Union (AARU).

Cihan University students, faculty and staff study, work and live on three campuses: Erbil, Sulaymaniyah, and Duhok. In 2014, the university offered courses in 12 departments.

In 2011, a campus of Cihan University in Sulaimaniya was approved by the Kurdish Ministry of Higher Education and Scientific Research (Reference Number: N302, 12-May-2011, KRG).

In 2017, Cihan University-Erbil obtained full accreditation from the Iraqi Ministry of Higher Education and Scientific Research.

== See also ==
- List of universities in Iraq
