= University of Alkafeel =

Private university in Najaf, Iraq

- Arabic: جامعة الكفيل
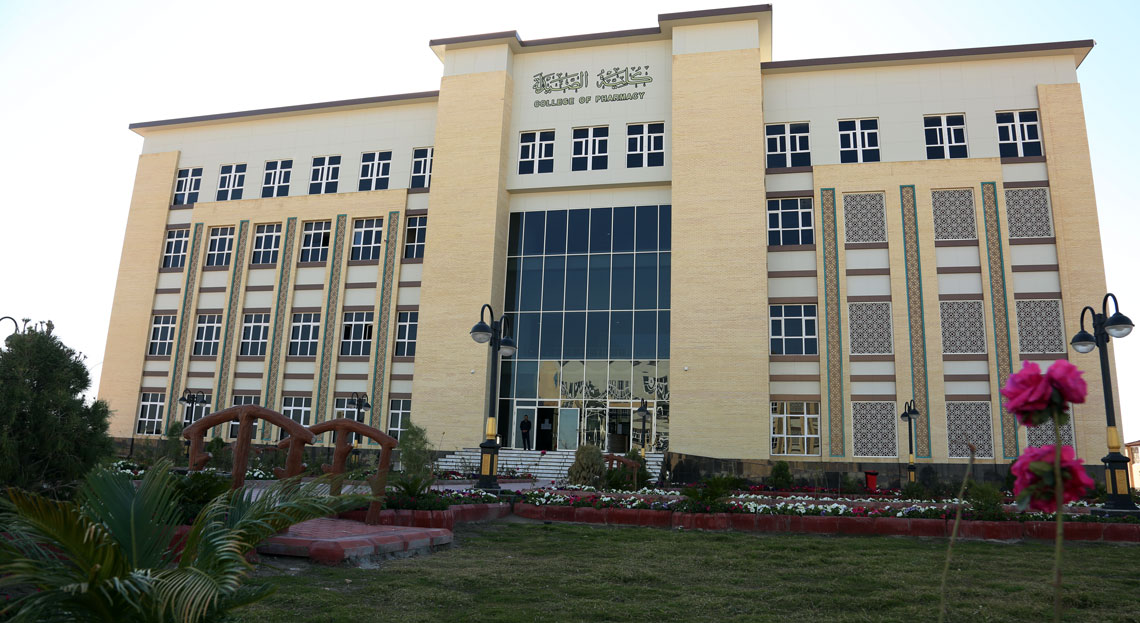
- Type: Private
- Established: 1 October 2003; 23 years ago
- President: Prof. Dr. Nawras Al-Dahan
- Undergraduates: 3605
- Location: Najaf, Najaf, Iraq
- Website: alkafeel.edu.iq

Location of University in Iraq

The University of AlKafeel (formerly the College of Humanitarian Studies and the Alkafeel University College) is an Iraqi university located in Najaf, Iraq established in 2003, and owned by Al-Abbasiya Mausoleum.

== Brief summary ==
University of Al-Kafeel was established on 1 October 2003, by the charity of Najaf. The university was recognized by the ministry of higher education and scientific research. According to this order, the University of AL-Kafeel gives the bachelor's degree, based on the regulations of the ministry of Higher Education and scientific research in Iraq. Alumni of the university are eligible to continue their postgraduate study inside and outside Iraq. During 2017, a total of 7,482 students joined the university, and 3,736 students graduated.

== Faculties ==
The university of AL-Kafeel consists of the following colleges and departments:

- College of Dentistry
- College of Pharmacy
- College of Laboratories and Medical Techniques
- College of Technical Engineering
- College of Law
- Department of Media
- Department of Shariaa
- Department of Religious Tourism

== See also ==
- List of universities in Iraq
