= Al-Hadba'a University College =

Private university in Mosul, Iraq

Coordinates: 36.344733°N 43.144641°E

Al-Hadba University
- جامعة الحدباء
- Former names: Al Hadbaa University College
- Motto: Where Heritage Meets Innovation
- Type: private
- Established: 1994
- Location: Mosul, Nineveh, Iraq

Al-Hadba University is a private Iraqi university established in 1994 as Al Hadbaa University College, in Mosul, Iraq.

== History ==
Al-Hadba University was established in 1994; this university is one of the oldest private universities in Iraq and the first private one in Mosul.

This university was affected by the ISIS war in Mosul as the public Mosul university, in 2014 after getting rid of the terrorists this university resumed its education; as "All The Way Up For The Knowledge"....

The university is accredited by the Ministry of Higher Education and Scientific Affairs in Iraq.

== Colleges ==
- College of Administration and Economics
- College of Law
- College of Arts
- College of Technical Engineering
- College of Health and Medical Techniques
- College of Dentistry
- College of Pharmacy
- College of Nursing
- College of Physical Education and Sports Sciences

== Departments ==
- Department of Accounting
- Department of Business Administration
- Department of English
- Department of Computer Technology Engineering
- Department of Medical Equipment Technology Engineering
- Department of Medical Laboratory Techniques
- Department of Anesthesia Techniques
- Department Cosmetic Techniques and Laser
- Department of Renal Dialysis Techniques

== See also ==
- List of universities in Iraq
