= Erbil Polytechnic University =

Public university in Iraqi Kurdistan

Coordinates: 36.1431°N 44.0379°E

- جامعة اربيل التقنية
- Type: Public university
- Established: 1996
- President: Prof.Dr.Edrees Muhammad Tahir Harki
- Location: Erbil, Iraq
- Campus: hadichawshli street
- Website: www.epu.edu.iq/kurdi/

Erbil Polytechnic University (Kurdish: زانکۆی پۆلیتەکنیکی هەولێر, Arabic: جامعة أربيل التقنية) is a public polytechnic university located in Erbil, Kurdistan Region, Iraq. The university was founded in 1993 by the Kurdistan National Council and officially opened in 1996 under the name Foundation of Technical Institutes. In 2012, it was reorganized and renamed as Erbil Polytechnic University.

== History ==
The institution was initially established in 1993 by the Kurdistan National Council under the name Foundation of Technical Institutes. After the establishment of technical colleges, the institution became known as Foundation of Technical Studies. In 2012, it was officially transformed into Erbil Polytechnic University, consisting of four colleges and seven technical institutes.

== Mission ==
Erbil Polytechnic University aims to provide technical and vocational education through specialized academic programs designed to meet labor market demands. The university focuses on developing human capacities and technical skills for graduates of preparatory schools. It also supports scientific research, innovation, and consultancy services in technical and applied sciences.

== Polytechnic Journal ==
Polytechnic Journal is a multidisciplinary, peer-reviewed, open-access academic journal published by Erbil Polytechnic University (EPU). The journal is a double-blind refereed publication that ensures the anonymity of both authors and reviewers during the evaluation process. Manuscripts are reviewed by expert members of the Editorial Review Board to ensure objective and unbiased assessment.

The journal publishes original research articles, review papers, and short communications in the fields of Pure Science, Applied Science, Technology, and Engineering. It operates under the Creative Commons Attribution-NonCommercial-NoDerivatives 4.0 International (CC BY-NC-ND 4.0) license and provides immediate, international, and subscription-free access to published research articles.

Polytechnic Journal is published twice annually in June and December. The journal carries the ISSN 2313-5727 and e-ISSN 2707-7799. According to the SCImago Journal Rank (SJR), the journal was classified as a Q2 multidisciplinary journal with an SJR indicator of 0.231 in 2025.

The journal initially published printed issues during the mid-2010s, and early volumes were not available online because no electronic platform existed at the time. Volumes 7 and 8 were later digitized and made electronically accessible. From April 2019 (Volume 9) until Volume 13, Issue 1, the journal operated through the Open Journal Systems (OJS) platform. In August 2023, beginning with Volume 13, Issue 2, the journal migrated to the Elsevier Digital Commons editorial management system to improve submission, review, and publication processes.

To maintain publication quality, the journal limits the number of published articles to a maximum of 24 per year. The Editorial Board consists predominantly of international members, and most manuscript reviews are conducted by international peer reviewers to ensure rigorous academic standards and quality control.

== Colleges and Institutes ==
=== Colleges ===
- Erbil Technical Engineering College
- Erbil Technical Health and Medical College
- Erbil Technical Administrative College
- Erbil Technology College
- Shaqlawa Technical College
- Soran Technical College

=== Institutes ===
- Erbil Technical Administrative Institute
- Erbil Medical Technical Institute
- Erbil Technology Institute
- Khabat Technical Institute
- Koya Technical Institute
- Mergasor Technical Institute
- Choman Technical Institute

== See also ==
- List of universities in Iraq
