= Al-Turath University =

Coordinates: 33°19′5″N 44°21′38″E

- جامعة التراث
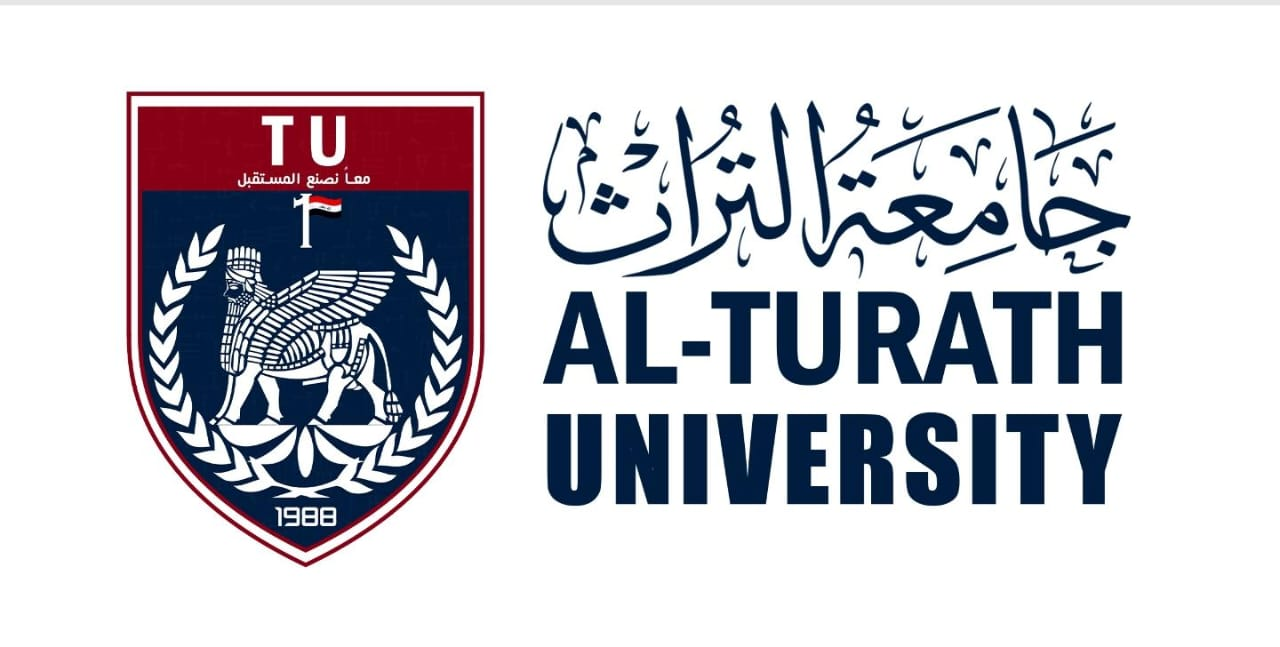
- Former names: Al Turath University - جامعة التراث
- Motto: Per Scientiam Gentes Ascendunt
- Type: Private
- Established: 1988
- Chairman: Mr. Ali Obaid Felaih Al-Ugaili
- Dean: Prof. Dr. Jaffar Jaber Jawad
- Location: Al Mansour, Baghdad, Baghdad, 07808770800, Iraq
- Website: https://uoturath.edu.iq/

Al-Turath University (Arabic: جامعة التراث) is a private Iraqi university and the oldest of such type in Iraq. Established in 1988 in the Mansour district of Baghdad, The name al-turath (التراث) means "heritage" or "tradition".

== Establishment of the University ==
The establishment of Al-Turath University was back in 1988 as the first private sector educational institution in Iraq to meet the changing needs of the Iraqi society in terms of embracing students wishing to study within certain specialties based on the desire and personal ambition of each student and his/her future vision whenever public universities cannot meet such ambitions.

== The emergence of the University ==
Today, Al-Turath University has modern classrooms and laboratories equipped with all modern supplies and equipment.

The university is interested in aspects of scientific research by investing the energies of educators and students in theoretical and applied scientific research and studies, as well as training, raising awareness and scientific development within future foundations in line with modern developments through the acquisition of high technical and professional expertise and harnessing them scientifically and academically according to an advanced methodological perspective.

The university organizes and adopts several different scientific and cultural events to occupy its distinguished position among its peers at the local and international levels through its support and organization of a number of international conferences, symposiums and training courses.

== Chairman of Board of Trustees ==
Mr. Ali Obaid Felaih Al-Ugaili obtained a bachelor’s degree in law and assumed the post of chairing the Board of Trustees on 7/22/2017, his goal is (We Preserve Values & Prepare for Future).

== University's President ==
Dr. Jaafar Jaber Jawad currently assumed the post of President of Al-Turath University on 12/05/2019.

Dr. Jaafar obtained a Ph.D. from the University of Baghdad in 2000, where he lectured in many Arab countries, like Yemen and Libya.

He assumed the posts as head of the scientific Department for five years, Dean of Al Salam College and is currently the president of Heritage (Al Turath) University.

He discussed many of the theses of Ph.D. and Master’s students and participated in many scientific committees.

== Vision ==
Al Turath University thrives to be the pioneer among its local and international peers via participating in many scientific, cultural, economic and social events in Iraq and abroad.

== Message ==
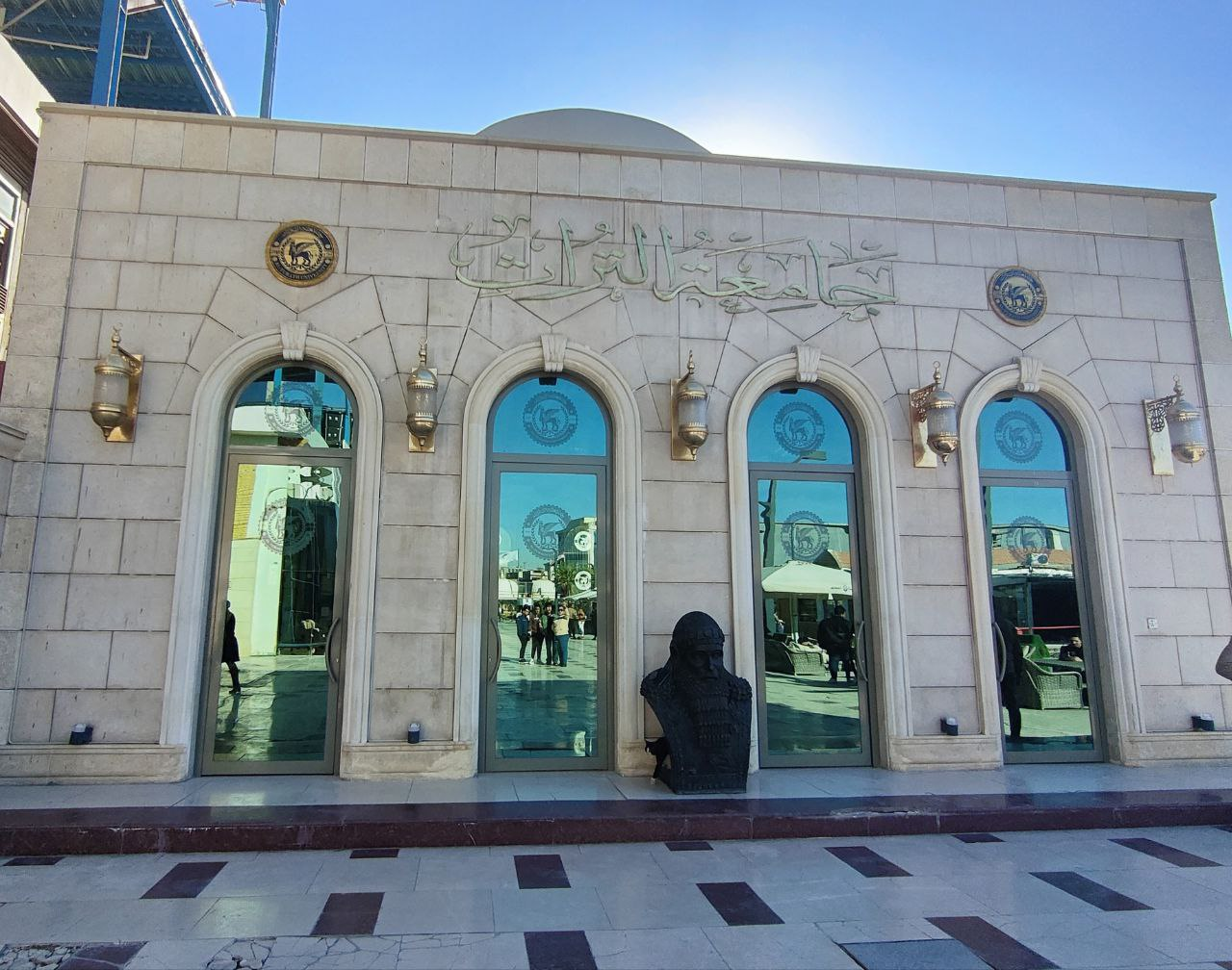

Preparing study programs that correspond with the standards approved by international educational institutes in a way that participates effectively in providing the labor market’s needs and preparing qualified staffs from the graduates to compete locally and internationally, as well as enhancing the role of the University as a pioneer institute in developing of the scientific research and community services, as well as the growth of the financial and human resources of the University.

== Goals ==
- Preparing human staff from the graduates of the University and qualifying them scientifically, culturally and professionally to support the public, private and mixed sectors.
- Developing and introducing modern scientific majors and curriculum to keep pace with the development taking place internationally considering the capabilities available to the University that meets the labor markets’ needs.
- Working on enhancing the quality of the educational outcome by establishing modern research centers which participates in enriching and developing the scientific research in variety of majors.
- Establishing solid and real partnership with the international academic institutions and recognized universities in a way that participates in paving the way for academic and scientific cooperation for the University to take its real place among its peers.

== University’s Colleges ==
- College of Pharmacy
- College of Dentistry
- College of Nursing
- College of Law
- College of Media
- College of Health and Medical Technologies
- College of Engineering Technology
- College of Engineering
- College of Science
- College of Administration and Economics
- Collage of Fine Arts
- College of Education
- College of Arts
- College of Physical Education and Sports Sciences

== University’s Interests ==
The university's interests are sustainable development, supporting the Study in Iraq initiative and empowering women.

== Student’s Services ==
All services provided for students, such as the laundry, sports facilities and clinics.

== See also ==
- Private universities in Iraq
