= College of Medicine University of Tikrit =

Government medical school in Tikrit, Iraq

Tikrit University College of Medicine (TUCOM)
- كلية الطب جامعة تكريت
- Type: Public university
- Established: 1987
- Academic affiliation: University of Tikrit
- Address: Yamouk street, Tikrit, Saladin Governorate, 28001, Iraq; 34.5817°N 43.6936°E
- Campus: Urban
- Language: English
- Website: https://cmed.tu.edu.iq/

Tikrit University College of Medicine (TUCOM) is a government medical school in Tikrit, Iraq. It is part of the University of Tikrit.

== History ==
It was established in 1987 alongside colleges of Education and Engineering. The first semester was in 1989.

== Curriculum ==
The college adopted a community-oriented problem-based learning curriculum from its establishment. This was the first in Iraq and followed examples globally and in the Eastern Mediterranean Region e.g. Ismailia and Gezira.

== Deans ==
1. Ghanim Alsheikh Sep 1988-Jan 2000
2. Abul-Ghani Mohammed Ali Feb 2000-May 2003
3. Abid Ahmad Salman May 2003-Jun 2010
4. Wisam Suhail Najim Jun 2010-Feb 2017
5. Salih Attiyah Allaw Feb 2017-Mar 2019
6. Usama Ghad Abul-Qadir Mar 2019-?
7. Wisam Suhail Najim (current)
