= University of Wasit =

Public university in Kut, Wasit, Iraq

Wasit university
- Type: Public
- Established: January 2003
- Location: Wasit, Wasit, Iraq; 32.500207°N 45.838537°E
- Campus: Urban
- Website: Wasit.edu

University of Wasit (Arabic: جامعة واسط) is one of the Iraqi Universities established in 2003 in Al Kut, Wasit, Iraq.

== Establishment ==
Wasit University was established in January 2003. The university included three colleges belonging to Al Qadisiyah University before establishment. The colleges were:

- College of Education, founded in 1996,
- College of Economics and Management founded in 2000 with the departments of Economics and Department of Management,
- College of Science, created in 2001 with the departments of Biology Sciences and Physics.

In 2005 the university expanded to include four new colleges:

- Arts,
- Medicine,
- Engineering,
- Law.

New departments were:

- Physical Education,
- Oriental Studies at the College of Arts and Chemistry Department, at the College of Science.
- Public Central Library,
- Cultural Center for women,
- Office of Engineering Consultant in the College of Engineering,
- Centre for Excellence and Creativity.

New colleges were:

- College of Education,
- College of Agriculture.

== Colleges ==
- College of Education, 1996,
- College of Management and Economics, 2000,
- College of Science, 2001,
- College of Fine Arts, 2005,
- College of Medicine, 2005,
- College of Engineering, 2005,
- College of Law, 2005,
- College of Agriculture,
- College of Basic Education,
- College of Sports Education, 2010,
- College of Veterinary Medicine.
- College of Dentistry
- College of Physical Education and Sports Science
- College of Computer and Mathematics
- College of Media

== See also ==
- List of universities in Iraq
