= Knowledge University =

Private university in Iraq

Coordinates: 36°06′49″N 44°02′44″E

- Motto: "Learn From Us And Accelerate Your Bright Future."
- Type: Private
- Established: 2009
- Chairman: Abbas Fadil Abdulrahman
- President: Prof . Dr. Ahmad Anwer Dzay
- Academic staff: 100
- Students: 2,653
- Location: Erbil, Kurdistan- Iraq, Iraq
- Colours: Blue and goldenrod
- Website: knu.edu.iq

The Knowledge University (Kurdish: زانکۆی نۆلج; Arabic: جامعة نولج) is a private university located in Erbil, Iraqi Kurdistan, and licensed from the ministry of higher education and scientific research in Kurdistan Region of Iraq. Currently the university consists of 6 colleges.

== Colleges ==
- Dentistry
- Pharmacy
- Nursing
- Engineering
- Science
- Law
- Education
- Administrative and Financial Sciences

== Centers ==
- English Language Center
- Research Center
- Continuing Education Center

== See also ==
- List of universities in Iraq
