= Al-Muthana University =

University in Samawah, Muthanna, Iraq

Coordinates: 31°20′19″N 45°17′20″E

- جامعة المثنـــى
- Established: 2007
- President: Prof. Dr. Amer ALi Al-Atwi
- Vice-president: Prof. Dr. Kasim Al Hello
- Location: Samawah, Muthanna, Iraq
- Website: http://mu.edu.iq/

Al Muthanna University is an Iraqi university located in Samawah, Al Muthanna Province, Iraq. It was established in 2007.

== Colleges ==
- College of Agriculture
- College of Education
- College of Science
- College of engineering (chemical engineering, civil engineering, Architecture )
- College of medicine
- College of Law
- College of Nursing
- college of veterinary medicine
- College of Dentistry
- College of Basic Education
- College of Physical Education
- College of Administration and Economics
- College of Pharmacy
- College of Pure science

== See also ==
- List of universities in Iraq
