= Al-Subtain University =

Private university in Iraq

Al-Subtain International University for Medical Sciences
- جامعة السبطين
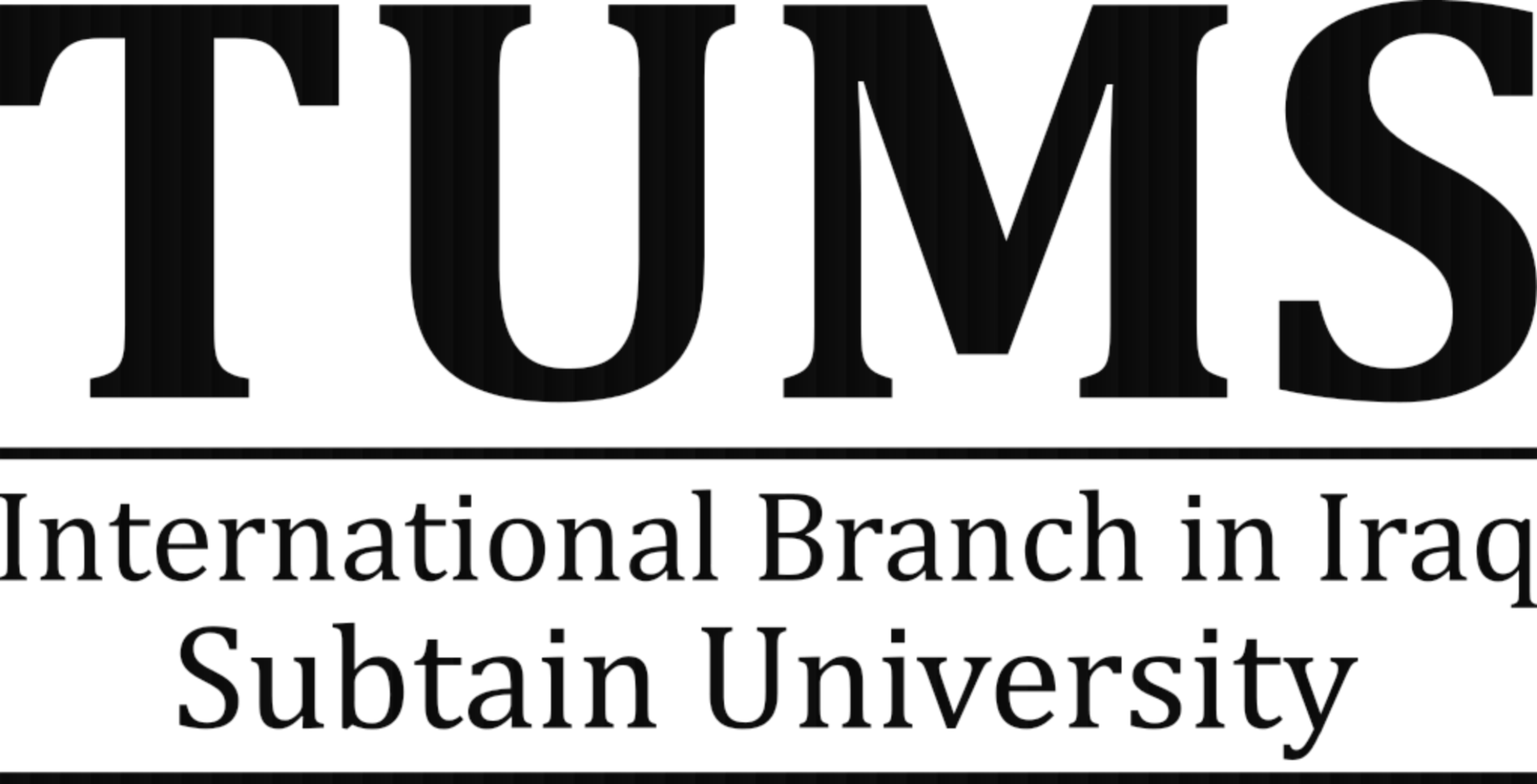
- Type: Private International University
- Established: December 28, 2022
- Founder: Al-Hussein Shrine
- Affiliations: University of Tehran
- Academic affiliations: Medical Sciences
- President: Dr. Faris Hasan Al Lami
- Location: Karbala, Iraq; 32.6122°N 44.0072°E
- Language: Arabic, English
- Website: subtain.university

Al-Subtain International University for Medical Sciences is a private international university located in Karbala, Iraq.

== History and establishment ==
The university was officially opened on December 28, 2022, in a ceremony attended by Iraq's Minister of Higher Education and Scientific Research, Dr. Naim Al-Aboudi, Iran's Minister of Health, Bahram Ain Allah, and several academic figures from Iraq and Iran. The university was established under the sponsorship of the Al-Hussein Shrine and is the first international medical sciences university in Karbala.

== International cooperation ==
The university is academically managed by Tehran University of Medical Sciences under a 50-year agreement, aimed at enhancing the level of education and scientific research in Iraq.

== Faculties and academic programs ==
The university comprises three main faculties:

- Faculty of Medicine
- Faculty of Nursing and Midwifery
- Faculty of Rehabilitation and Physical Therapy

== See also ==
- Imam Hussein Shrine
- Tehran University of Medical Sciences
