= University of Babylon =

Public university in Babylon, Iraq

Coordinates: 32.3927°N 44.4013°E

- جامعة بابل
- Type: Public
- Established: 1991
- President: Prof. Dr. Ameen Alyasiri
- Students: 10,000
- Location: Babylon, Iraq
- Campus: Urban
- Website: www.uobabylon.edu.iq

The University of Babylon (Arabic: جامعة بابل) is a university located in Babylon, Iraq. It consists of 20 colleges within three compounds, located seven kilometers south of the city of Hillah, in Babylon Province. The campus was originally the Administrative Institute of Babylon. Later some of the buildings were adopted for use by the medical college of the University of Kufa, before being established as a university in its own right in 1991.

The university now teaches a wide variety of subjects, and during the 1990s, started teaching night classes. These became popular, especially among well-off families, after the increase in difficulty of high school examinations in 1997.

It publishes the Journal of University of Babylon and Medical Journal of Babylon.

== Student body ==
The university attracts students from various regions. The largest part of the student body is made up of students from Babylon Province. It also attracts numerous students from Karbala, Baghdad, Diwaniyah, Kufa and Najaf.

The university has a student-run newspaper. Plays produced by students of the College of Fine Arts are performed both internally and in national events and forums. University alumni have powers to elect staff.

== Colleges ==
The university is split into twenty colleges, which are as follows:

- College of Agriculture
- College of Arts
- College of Basic Education
- College of Information Technology
- College of Dentistry
- College of Education (Jābir ibn Hayyān)
- College of Education (Ṣafī al-Dīn)
- College of Engineering
- College of Fine Arts
- College of Law
- College of Management and Economics
- College of Material Engineering
- College of Medicine
- College of Medicine of Hamorabi
- College of Nursing
- College of Pharmacy
- College of Physical Education
- College of Qur'anic Studies
- College of Science
- College of Science for Woman
- College of Veterinary Medicine

== See also ==
- List of Islamic educational institutions
- List of universities in Iraq
