= University of Zakho =

Educational establishment in Iraq

Coordinates: 37°6′50″N 42°40′25″E

- Zankoya Zaxo, زانکۆیا زاخۆ
- Type: Public
- Established: 2010
- President: Dr. Nadhim Sulaiman Abdulaziz Jakhsi
- Vice-president: Asst. Prof. Dr. Jassim Mohammed Abdo
- Administrative staff: >600
- Undergraduates: >5000
- Location: Zakho, Duhok Governorate, Iraqi Kurdistan, Iraq
- Campus: Urban
- Colors: Blue and Yellow
- Website: Official website

The University of Zakho (UoZ) is located in Zakho, the Duhok Governorate, Iraqi Kurdistan, northern Iraq.

== History ==
Its founding was announced as an independent university in July 2010. Before this date, there were the Colleges of Education and of Commerce, which were affiliated with the University of Duhok. The University of Zakho along with another three new universities were founded following the resolution made by the Parliament of Kurdistan Regional to address the increased demand for higher education studies in the region.

Once the university was nominated, the colleges of Education and Commerce were reorganized into two faculties: Science and Humanities.

== Faculties and Colleges ==
=== Faculty of Science ===
Once the new campus in Zakho was completed, the Colleges of Education and Commerce, which were affiliated with the University of Duhok, were transferred at the beginning of the academic year 2005/2006. After announcing the University of Zakho as an independent university according to Prime Minister Resolution No. 1670, on July, 8th 2010 and the Ministry of Higher Education resolution No. 644 on July 12, 2010, the Colleges of Education and Commerce were reorganized into the Faculties of Science and Humanities.

The Faculty of Science includes six departments:

- Biology
- Chemistry
- Physics
- Computer Science
- Mathematics
- Environmental Science (The last high school graduates in this department received in 2020)

The duration of the study in the faculty is four academic years and the graduate will obtain B. Sc. degree in Science. Students accepted in the college of Education will be awarded B. Sc. Degree in Education. The College enrolls at the moment, 982 undergraduate students. The Faculty is offering postgraduate programs (M. Sc. and Ph.D.).

=== College of Engineering ===
The College of Engineering was established in summer 2013. The University of Zakho announced the Petroleum Engineering as the first department of the Faculty of Engineering in 2013, due to the increasing demand for petroleum engineers and production of oil in the region. Indeed, more departments will be launched in the future. The duration of the study in the faculty is four academic years and graduate students will obtain a bachelor's degree in Science (BSc). The faculty has established links with the industry and academic collaboration with various universities such as the University of Leeds, the University of Derby, the University of Nottingham, and the University of Colorado, as well as local universities in the region.

The College of Engineering includes two departments:

- Petroleum Engineering
- Mechanical Engineering

=== Faculty of Humanities ===
The Faculty of Humanities includes six departments:

- Kurdish language
- English language
- Arabic language
- Turkish language
- History
- Islamic Studies

At the beginning of the next academic year, a new “Department of the Origin of Religions “ will be operating as well.

=== Faculty of Education ===
The Faculty of Humanities includes three schools, namely:

- School of Physical Education
- School of Basic Education
- School of General Psychology

=== College of Administration and Economics ===
The College includes three departments, namely:

- Department of Economic Sciences
- Department of Banking and Financial Sciences
- Department of Management Sciences

== See also ==
- List of universities in Iraq
