= Middle Technical University =

Technical university in Baghdad, Iraq

Coordinates: 33.3195°N 44.3655°E

Middle Technical University (Arabic: الجامعة التقنية الوسطى) is a technical university in Baghdad, the capital city of Iraq.
