= University of Diyala =

Public university in Baqubah, Iraq

Coordinates: 33°40′44″N 44°35′54″E

- جامعـــة ديالـــى
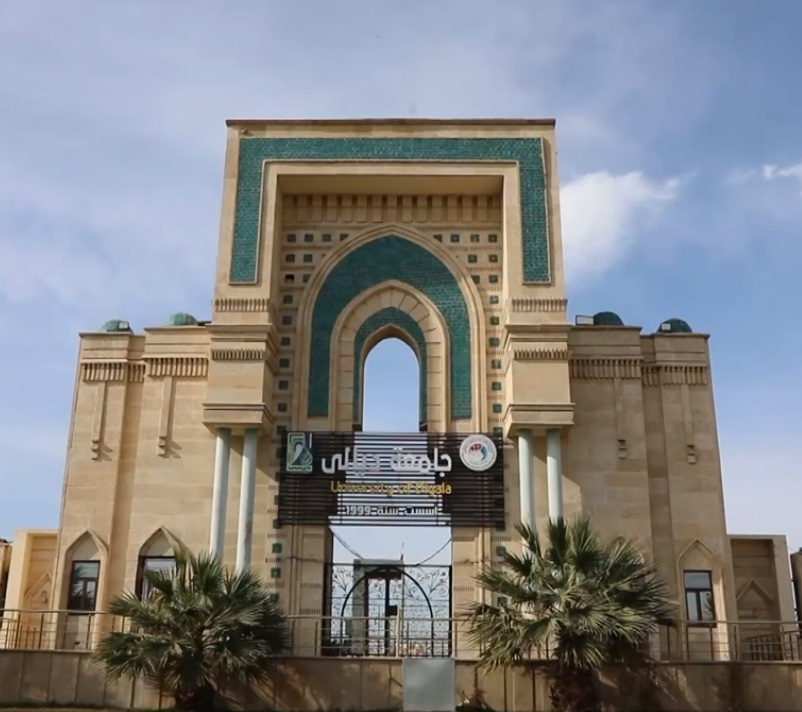
- Entrance of University of Diyala
- Type: Public university
- Established: 1999
- Location: Baqubah, Diyala, Iraq
- Website: www.uodiyala.edu.iq

The University of Diyala is an Iraqi university located in Baquba, Diyala Governorate, Iraq. It was established in 1999.

== Colleges of University of Diyala ==
- Basic Education College
- College of Education For Human Science
- College of Education For Pure Science
- College of Physical Education
- College of Engineering
- College of Science
- College of Law and Political Science
- College of Medicine
- College of Veterinary
- College of Agriculture
- College of Economic
- College of Islamic
- College of Arts
- College of Education for Girls

== See also ==
- List of universities in Iraq
