= University of Misan =

Public university in Amarah, Maysan, Iraq

Coordinates: 31°48′39″N 47°10′33″E

- جامعة ميسان
- Type: Public university
- Established: 2007
- Location: Amarah, Maysan, Iraq
- Website: www.uomisan.edu.iq

The University of Misan is an Iraqi university located in Amarah, Maysan, Iraq. It was established in 2007. Originally, the university consisted of the College of Basic Education and the College of Education, which were part of University of Basrah.

== Colleges ==
- College of Medicine
- College of Dentistry
- College of Science
- College of Law
- College of Administration and Economy
- College of Basic Education
- College of Education
- College of Physical Education

== See also ==
- List of universities in Iraq
