= University of Dhi Qar =

Public university in Nasiriyah, Iraq

Coordinates: 31°3′2″N 46°13′15″E

- جامعة ذي قـار
- Type: Public university
- Established: 2000
- Location: Nasiriyah, Dhi Qar, Iraq
- Website: http://utq.edu.iq/

University of Dhi Qar (Arabic: جامعة ذي قار) is an Iraqi university located in Nasiriyah, Iraq. It was established in 2000. Originally, the university was a branch of the University of Basrah, and the branch was established in 1992. Its first graduating class was in 1996. In 2000, the branch became independent of Basrah University and University of Dhi Qar was founded.

== Colleges ==
- College of Medicine
- College of Pharmacy
- College of Dentistry
- College of Engineering
- College of Science
- College of Agriculture and Marshes
- College of Education
- College of Law
- College of Arts

== See also ==
- List of universities in Iraq
