= University of Kirkuk =

Public university in Kirkuk, Iraq

- جامعـــة كركـــوك
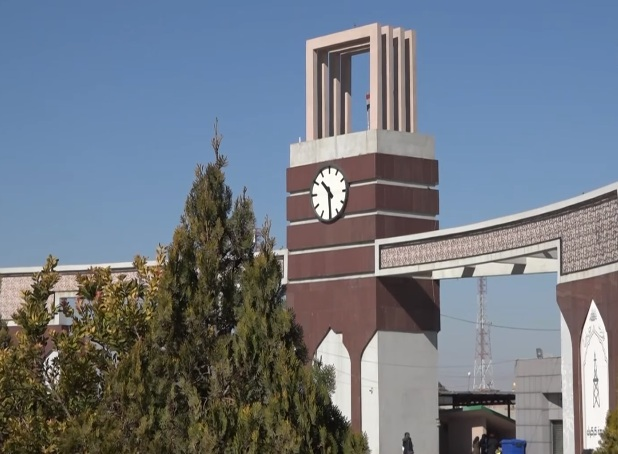
- Entrance of the University
- Type: Public university
- Established: 2003
- Location: Kirkuk, Iraq; 35.395105°N 44.340327°E
- Website: www.uokirkuk.edu.iq

The University of Kirkuk (Arabic: جامعة كركوك) is an Iraqi university established in 2003 in Kirkuk, Iraq.

The University of Kirkuk included eight faculties/colleges when it was established in 2003. These were Engineering, Medicine, Law, Management & Economics, Science, Education, Nursing, and Agriculture. These Faculties has changed much since its inception, represented by the achievements of the mixed ethnic/religious students, in the various disciplines as well as academic/research programs provided by the faculty. After the creation of three new Colleges/Faculties of Medicine, Engineering and Agriculture, the college of Education was established with its five Departments: Qur'anic Sciences, Geography, Physical Education, Kurdish language, and Turkish Language. The Faculty of Sciences was established with four Departments: Biology, Physics, Chemistry, and Earth Sciences. In (2007-2008) the Faculty of Management and Economics was established to include the Departments of Business Administration and Statistics. Besides the development of the Faculty of Medicine with its nine disciplines/Branches: Microbiologist, Biochemistry, Surgery, Anatomy, Diseases, Internal Medicine, Physiology Medicine, Community Medicine. In the academic year (2008-2009), the Branch of Child Medicine was established. In the academic year (2009-2010), the Department of Mechanical Engineering was introduced to the College of Engineering. The UoK intends to exercise its best efforts to develop a cooperation program, establishing ties of friendship, promoting mutual academic/research collaboration, cultural and personnel/training exchanges, and working toward more specific and binding agreements.

== See also ==
- List of universities in Iraq
