= University of Anbar =

Public university in Ramadi, Anbar, Iraq

Coordinates: 33.4027°N 43.2623°E

- جامعة الأنبار
- Type: Public
- Established: 1987; 39 years ago
- Location: Ramadi, Al Anbar, Iraq
- Website: University of Anbar (in English)

The University of Anbar (Arabic: جامعة الأنبار) is an Iraqi university in Ramadi, Al Anbar, Iraq. It was founded in 1987 with a college of education and a college of girls' education, and then expanded until it reached university status in 2011 with 18 colleges. These colleges including 66 scientific departments, in addition to 6 Research Centers.

== Colleges ==
- College of Education of the Human Sciences. (History, Arabic Language, English Language, Geographic, Quran Sciences)
- College of Education, Pure Sciences. (Mathematics, Physics, Chemistry, Biology, Psychological Science)
- College of Science. (Mathematics, Physics, Chemistry, Biology)
- College of Engineering. (Mechanic, Civil, Electric, Dams and Water sources)
- College of Arts. (English Language, Arabic Language, History, Geographic, Sociology, Media)
- College of Law and Political Studies – Ramadi
- College of Computer Science and Information Technology
- College of Islamic Sciences – Ramadi (Hadith, Fiqh, Quran Sciences, Islamic Faiths)
- College of Administrations and Economics – Ramadi
- College of Physical Education and Sport Sciences
- College of Medicine
- College of Dentistry
- College of Agriculture
- College of Education for Women
- College of Education – Al-Qa'im
- College of Pharmacy
- College of Applied Sciences - Heet
- College of Basic Education - Haditha

== See also ==
- List of Islamic educational institutions
- List of universities in Iraq
