= Ministry of Higher Education and Scientific Research (Iraq) =

Government ministry of Iraq

Republic of Iraq Ministry of Higher Education and Scientific Research
- وزارة التعليم العالي والبحث العلمي

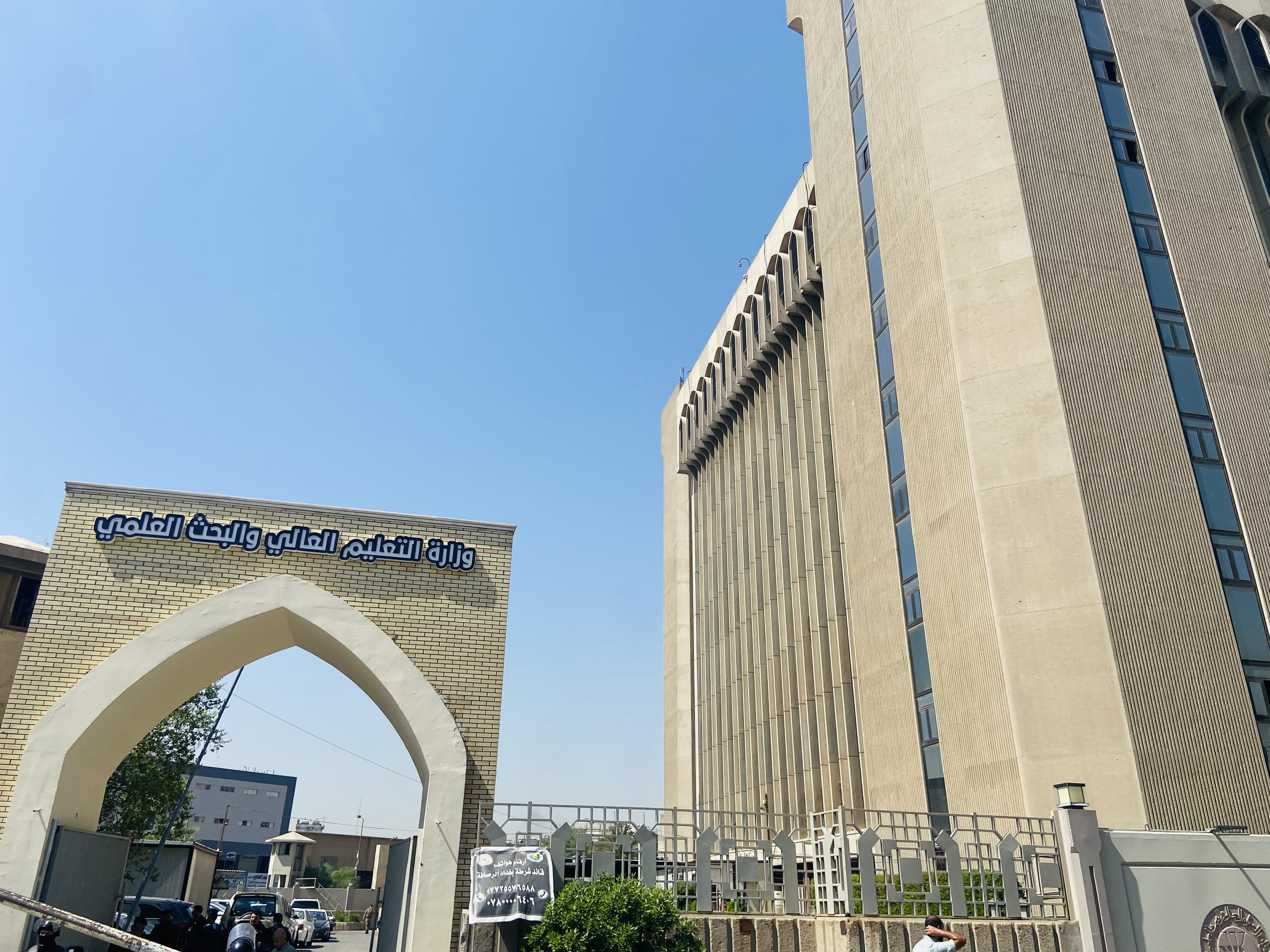

Agency overview
- Jurisdiction: Government of Iraq
- Headquarters: Baghdad
- Minister responsible: Haydar al-Hasani, Minister
- Website: www.mohesr.gov.iq

The Ministry of Higher Education and Scientific Research (MOHESR) is a central government ministry of Iraq responsible for higher education and scientific research. It monitors the work of universities and allocates their budgets. It is also responsible for the sponsorship of Iraqi students to study in overseas universities in Britain, the United States, Australia, and other countries, and has consulates in those places as well.

== See also ==
- List of universities in Iraq
