= Tikrit University =

Public university in Tikrit, Iraq

Coordinates: 34.6808°N 43.6548°E

- جامعة تكريت
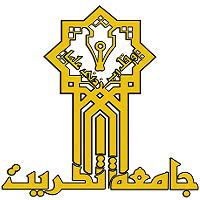
- Type: Public
- Established: 1987
- President: Prof. Dr. Waad Mahmood Raoof
- Administrative staff: 2,750
- Students: >30,000
- Undergraduates: 29,000
- Postgraduates: 2,300
- Location: Tikrit, Iraq
- Campus: Multiple sites
- Website: https://www.tu.edu.iq

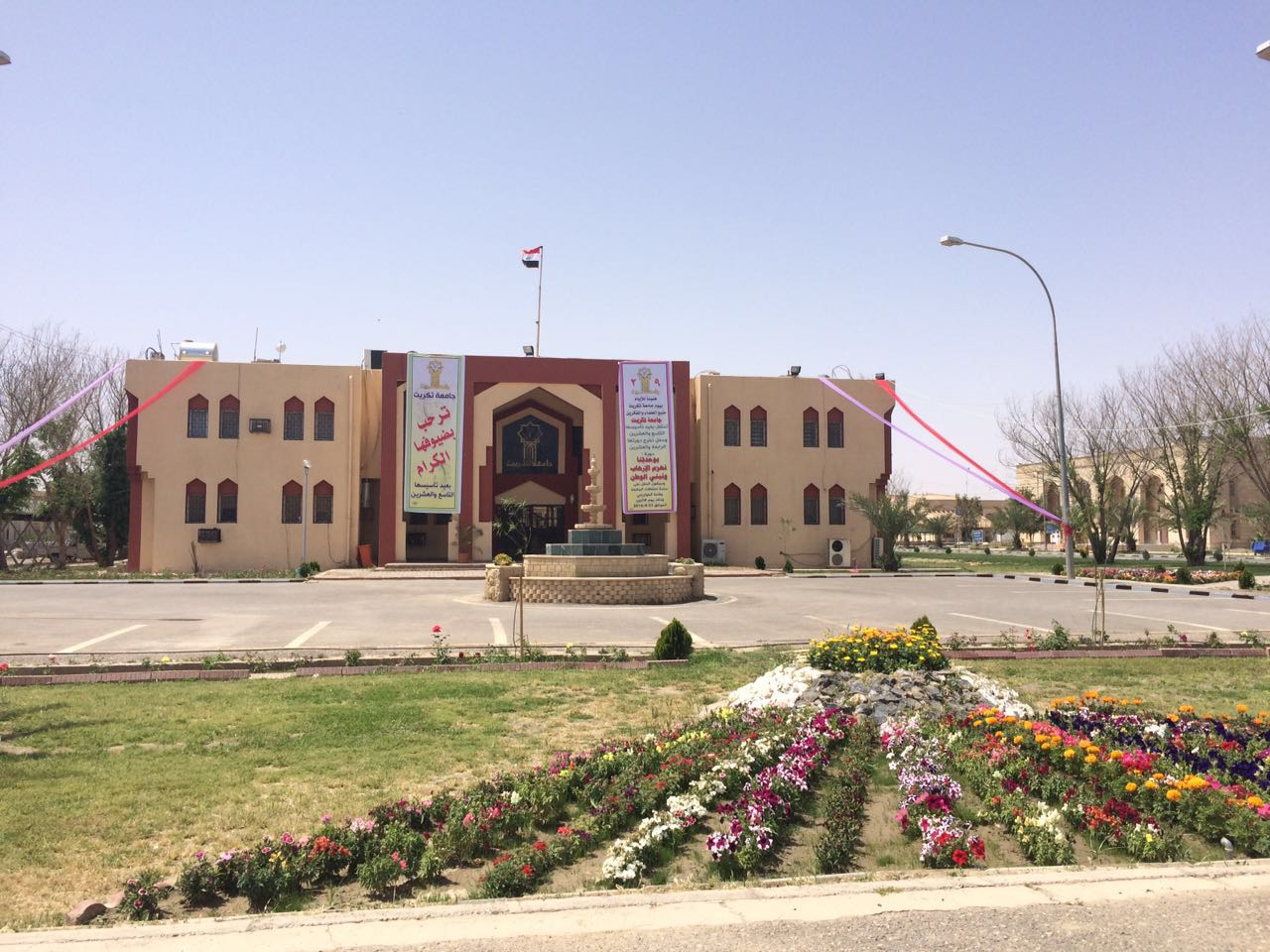
University campus

Tikrit University (Arabic: جامعة تكريت) is an Iraqi university located in Tikrit, Saladin Province, Iraq. It was established in 1987. It is one of the largest universities in Iraq with over 30,000 students.

While it has faced challenges in recent years due to the conflict that has engulfed Iraq, it has begun to reemerge as a respected institution of higher education. It has sought to partner with other universities around the globe in an effort to reconnect its faculty and students to a global network. The university is accredited by Accreditation Service for International Colleges.

== Colleges ==
The university includes a wide range of colleges:

1. College of Education
2. College of Engineering
3. College of Medicine
4. College of Agriculture
5. College of Dentistry
6. College of Veterinary Medicine
7. College of Pharmacy
8. College of Sciences
9. College of Oil Engineering and Minerals
10. College of Mathematics and Computer Sciences
11. College of Educations (Women)
12. College of Educational Sciences
13. College of Arts
14. College of Management and Economics
15. College of Law
16. College of Theology
17. College of Political Sciences
18. College of Education (Sharqat)
19. College of Sports Sciences

== See also ==
- List of universities in Iraq
