= University of Kufa =

Public university in Kufa, Iraq

Coordinates: 32.0196°N 44.3761°E

- جامعة الكوفة
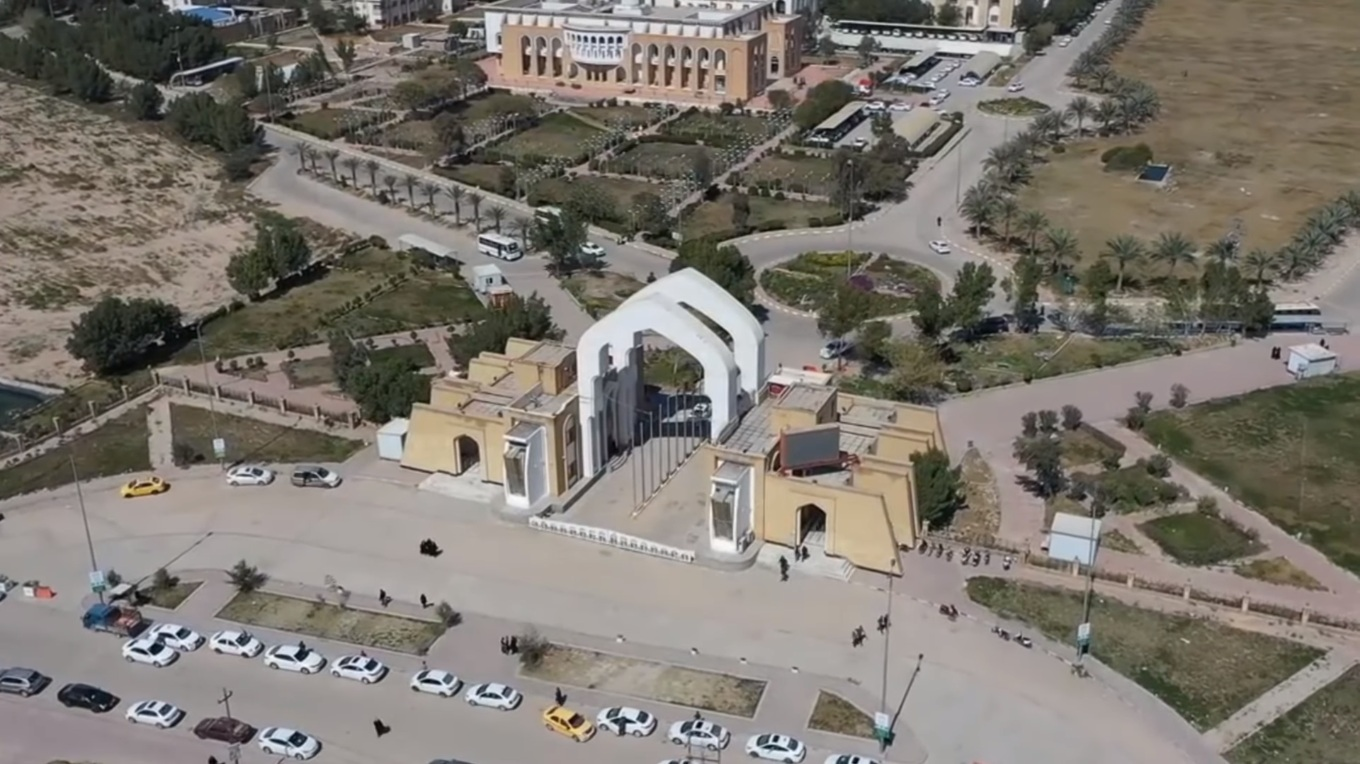
- Aerial view of the Campus Entrance
- Type: Public
- Established: 1987
- President: Yasir Lafta Hassoun
- Undergraduates: 27,614 from 1993 to 2018
- Postgraduates: 3,050 from 1993 to 2018
- Location: P.O Box 21, Kufa, Najaf Governorate, Iraq, Kufa, Najaf, 540011, Iraq
- Website: www.uokufa.edu.iq

The University of Kufa is one of Iraqi universities located in Kufa, Iraq. It was founded on December 23, 1987 of only two faculties; Education for Women and Medicine. Worthy mentioned that the Faculty of Medicine was established roughly a decade earlier and it was affiliated to Al-Mustansiriyah University. In 1989, the Faculty of Arts was initiated consisting of only two departments: History and Arabic Language, and then in 1993 the faculties of Administration, Sciences and Engineering were founded. In 1997, the Agriculture Faculty was established, then the faculty of Pharmacy in 1999.

The Faculty of Law was initiated in 2004 on the basis of the law department which was affiliated to Administration Faculty, and in 2006, Nursing, Dentistry and Veterinary Medicine Faculties were founded. At the same year, the Faculty of Jurisprudence, found in 1958, was reopened after being closed by Saddam Hussein's regime in 1991. In 2008, the Faculties of Mathematics and Computer, and Physical Education were established followed by Education and basic Education Faculties in 2009, and then in 2011, the Faculties of Urban Planning and Archaeology were founded.

In 2013, the department of Political Sciences dissociated from the Faculty of Law and became an independent Faculty. Finally, the Faculty of Languages was established in 2014, after that, the Faculty of Postgraduate Studies was founded in 2017. Thus, the University of Kufa comprises 22 faculties in different majors, and it has 109 departments. The university seeks more achievements and attainments via hard and diligent work to expand the number of faculties and departments of uncommon majors needed in labor market.

== Faculties ==
Faculty of Jurisprudence (1958)

It was reopened in 2003–2004 after being closed by Saddam Hussein's regime in 1991, the Faculty of Jurisprudence is the first established in Al-Najaf, in 1958. The Faculty of Islamic Studies grants bachelor's degrees in both Islamic jurisprudence and its disciplines and the Quran and Hadith in undergraduate study, and master and doctorate degrees in Sharia (Islamic jurisprudence) and Islamic Studies.

Faculty of Medicine (1977)

It was established in 1977, and attached to Al-Mustansiriya University in Baghdad; undergraduate studies were started in the academic year of 1979–1980, then the Faculty was transferred to the city of Kufa, to its current building. The first class graduated from this school in 1984. It offers degrees in medicine, at the undergraduate and graduate levels.

Education for Women (1987)

It was established in 1987, it has various departments: Arabic Language, Geography, Chemistry, Biology, Mathematics, Physics, Physical education, History, Computer sciences and English language.

Faculty of Arts (1989)

It was founded in 1989, it includes the following departments: Arabic language, History, Geography, Philosophy, English language, Civil society and Media department.

Faculty of Administration and Economy (1993)

It was founded in 1993, it includes: Business administration, Economy, Accounting, Banking and finance sciences and Tourism department.

Faculty of Science (1993)

It was founded in 1993 with Biology and Chemistry departments, then Physics in 1996 and Mathematics in 2002. Disease Analysis department and Environment and Pollution department were opened later, and finally, in January, 2013 Geology department was opened.

Faculty of Engineering (1993)

The Engineering faculty was established in 1993, it includes the following departments:

1. Civil Engineering
2. Mechanical Engineering
3. Electrical Engineering
4. Water Resources Engineering
5. Material Engineering,
6. Mechanical Engineering
7. Electronic and Communications Engineering
8. Chemical Engineering
9. Architectural Engineering
10. Chemical Engineering

Faculty of Agriculture (1997)

The Faculty of Agriculture was founded in 1997, it has now the following departments: the Plant Protection, Horticulture, Garden Engineering and Animal Resources and Soil and Water department.

Faculty of Pharmacy (1999)

It was founded in 1999; it offers a bachelor's degree in Pharmaceutics, Clinical pharmaceutics, Drugs, Laboratory sciences and Pharmaceutical chemistry, pharmacology.

Faculty of Law (2004)

It was founded in 2004, it has two departments: Public Law and Private Law department.

Faculty of Dentistry (2006)

It was founded in 2006, it includes: Basic sciences, Mouth and jaws surgery, Dental therapy, Dental industry, Oral diseases medicine and Orthodontics.

Faculty of Nursing (2006)

Faculty of Nursing was founded in 2006. It grants a bachelor's degree in: Basic nursing sciences, Adults nursing, Children nursing, Mother and newborn nursing, Community health and Mental health nursing.

Faculty of Veterinary Medicine (2009)

This faculty was established 2009. It has six departments: Physiology, Anatomy and Histology, Clinical sciences. Microbiology, Public health, Pathology and Poultry diseases.

Faculty of Computer and Mathematics sciences (2009)

It was founded in 2009, it includes: Mathematics department and Computer department.

Faculty of Physical education (2009)

It was founded in 2009, it includes: Theoretical sciences department, applied sciences, Single games and team games department.

Faculty of Education (2009)

It was founded in 2009, it includes: English language department, Computer sciences department, Art education, Quran sciences, Islamic education and Mathematics department.

Faculty of Basic Education (2009)

It was founded in 2009, it includes: Arabic language department, Kindergartens, Islamic education and Mathematics department.

Faculty of Archaeology (2011)

It was founded in 2009, it includes: Ancient Iraqi remains, Islamic remains and the department of Historic Manuscripts and documents.

Faculty of Urban Planning (2011)

It was established in 2011, it includes: Urban planning department, Environmental planning department and regional planning department.

Faculty of Political Sciences (2013)

It was established in 2013, it includes: Political Sciences department.

Faculty of Languages (2014)

It was established in 2014, it includes: English language, Turkish language, Persian language, and French language department.

Faculty of Postgraduate Studies (2017)

== University Global Rankings ==
The University Website uokufa.edu.iq occupied in July, 2011 the first place among the Iraqi universities websites within the Spanish Webometrics which classifies the universities websites due to quality standers. It previously occupied the rank of 6097 out of 12000 global universities followed by the University of Technology occupied 6503 and nine other Iraqi universities, including universities from Kurdistan, with varying rankings. The University of Kufa now ranking 2815 globally and it is the 3rd university in Iraq.

== Presidents who presided over the University of Kufa ==
Years of service	Names	Scientific title	Specialization
1987–1991	Prof. Dr. Yahiya Tawfeeq Al-Rawi	Professor	Geology
1991–1995	Prof. Asst. Dhafir Dawood Suleiman Al-Taee	Assistant Professor	Medicine & General Surgery
1995–1995	Prof. Dr. Yahiya Tawfeeq Al-Rawi	Professor	Geology
1995–2001	Prof. Dr. Khalil Ibrahim Al-Taif	Professor	Veterinary Medicine
2001–2003	Prof. Dr. Nabeel Al-Rawi	Professor	Electrical Engineering
2003–2006	Prof. Dr. Sayyid Hassan Issa Al-Hakim	Professor	History
2011–2006	Prof. Dr. AbdulRazzaq Abdul Jaleel Al-Issa	Professor	Biochemistry
2011–2017	Prof. Dr. Aqeel Abd Yassin Al-Kufi	Professor	Medical Genetics
2017–2017	Prof. Dr. Mahdi Mohamed Al-Sahlawi	Professor	Chemistry
2017–2019	Prof. Dr. Muhsin AlDhalimi	Professor	Dermatology
2019–2024	Prof. Dr. Yasir Lafta Hassoun	Professor	Otolaryngologist
2024-Present	Prof. Alaa Naji Jasem Almawla	Professor	Education

== Centers and units of the University ==
1. Information Technology Research and Development Center
2. Kufa Studying Center
3. the Central Library Building

== See also ==
- List of Islamic educational institutions
- List of universities in Iraq
