= University of Sulaimani =

Public university in Sulaymaniyah, Iraq

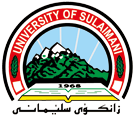
- Other name: UoS
- Motto: For Knowledge, for Freedom.
- Type: Public
- Established: 1968 (reopened in 1992)
- Founder: Mohammed Mohammed Salih Beg
- President: Dr Kosar Mohammed Ali
- Administrative staff: 3,000
- Undergraduates: 23,000
- Postgraduates: 2,300
- Location: Sulaymaniyah, Kurdistan Region, Iraq
- Campus: Urban
- Colors: Dark red and white
- Website: univsul.edu.iq

The University of Sulaimani (Sorani Kurdish: زانکۆی سلێمانی) is a public university located in the city of Sulaymaniyah in the Kurdistan Region of Iraq. It is the oldest university in the Kurdistan Region, and one of its most important scientific and cultural centers. The university was proposed by Professor Dr. Mohammed Salih Beg in 1958, founded in 1968, and reopened in 1992. The main campus is in Sulaimaniyah, with satellite campuses in Khanaqin, Kalar, Halabja, and Chamchamal. Within the region, it is known as the "mother university".

In 2025, according to the Scimago rankings, the University of Sulaimani was the top university in Iraqi Kurdistan, and was the highest-ranked university in the country according to the Times Higher Education rankings.

The university has an annual enrollment of more than 4,000 undergraduate and postgraduate students. It offers a wide range of degree programs in disciplines including medicine, engineering, humanities, law, fine arts, physical education, and political science. In several fields, the university also offers postgraduate qualifications, including Higher Diplomas, Master of Science (MSc), Master of Arts (MA), and Doctor of Philosophy (PhD) degrees. In addition, the university provides a variety of extracurricular activities. [citation needed]

== History ==
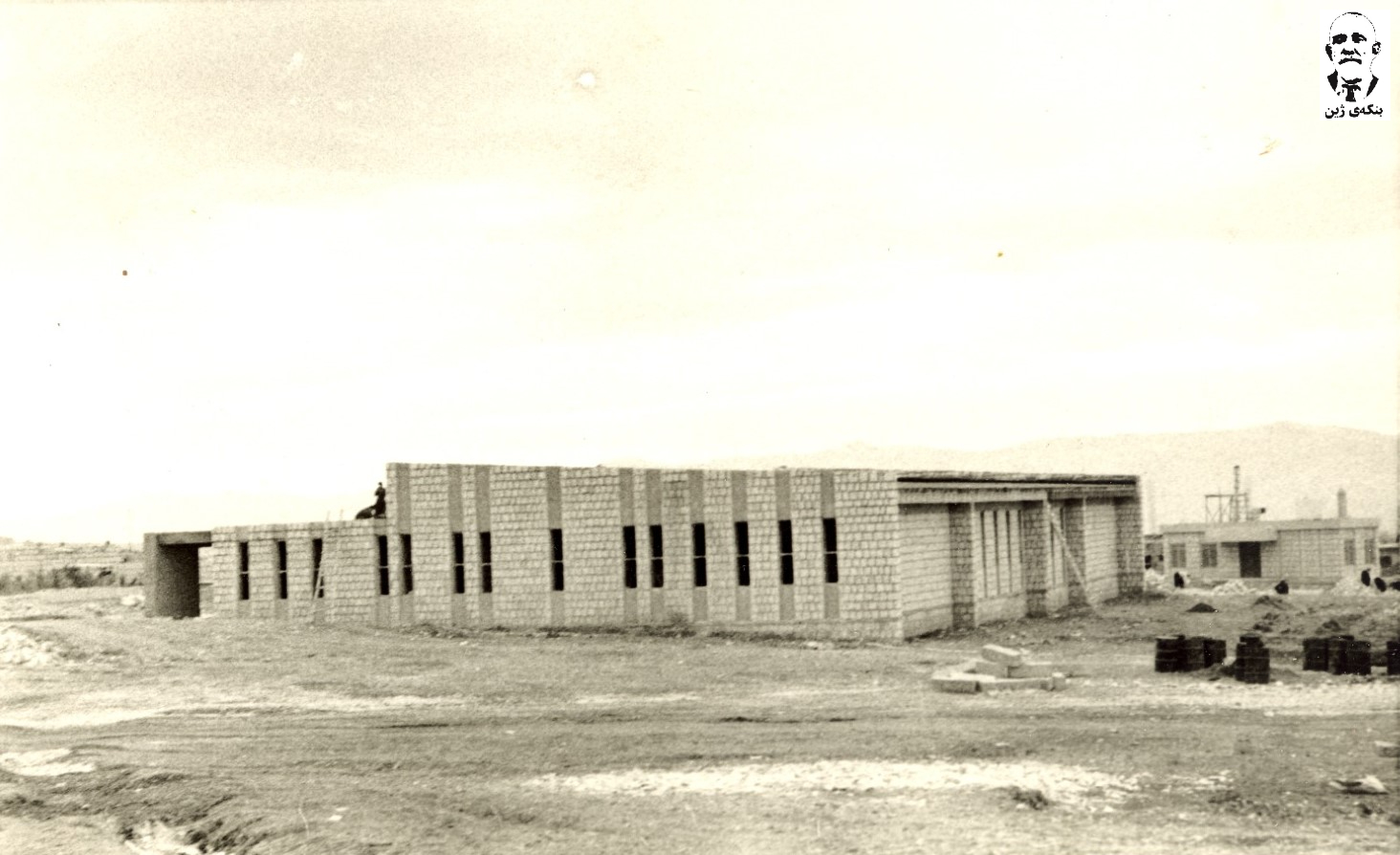
Building Campus Building in 1968

The university was founded in 1968 by the Iraqi government pursuant to Act No. 143 of 1968. This was largely due to the efforts of Dr. Mohammed Salih Beg, a professor of modern European history, the history of England, and political science; it was his primary aim in 1958 after gaining his PhD in 1957 from the University of Chicago. The university initially consisted of five faculties – Medicine, Engineering, Science, Agriculture, and Arts – but in the following years the number of faculties increased dramatically as a result of growing demands for higher education in the country.

In 1981, the Ba'ath regime transferred the academic establishment to the city of Erbil because of political activities against the regime, changing the name to Salahaddin University-Erbil. The Kurdistan Regional Government, under the Patriotic Union of Kurdistan, reopened the University of Sulaimani on 31 October 1992, with the first students admitted on 14 November.

In 2021, there were a large number of student protests calling for the reinstatement of allowances for students, which had been suspended in 2014.

== Faculties ==
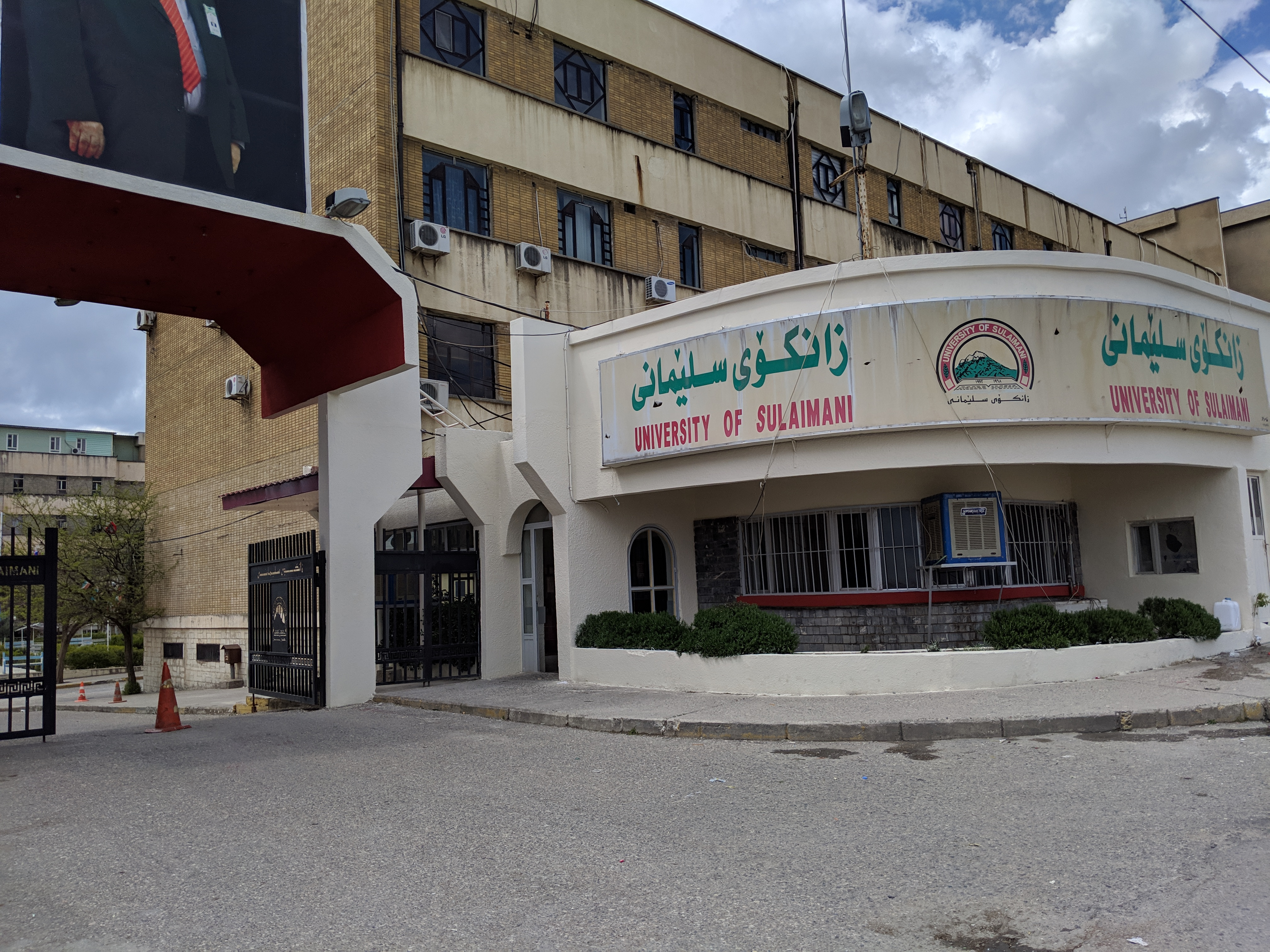
Old Campus Entrance

The University of Sulaimani has five campuses. Two of them are in the city of Sulaymaniah: The old campus (located in the city center), and the new campus (located on the Sulaymaniyah-Kirkuk main road, completed in 2012). Additionally, there are campuses in Said Sadiq, Chwarta, and Bakrajo.

The University of Sulaimani includes 21 colleges where students can obtain BSc and BA degrees. The colleges listed below, grouped by campus.

Old Campus:

- College of Commerce
- College of Dentistry
- College of Medicine
- College of Nursing
- College of Pharmacy

New Campus:

- College of Administration and Economics
- College of Basic Education
- College of Education
- College of Engineering
- College of Fine Arts
- College of Humanities
- College of Islamic Sciences
- College of Languages
- College of Law
- College of Physical Education and Sport Science
- College of Political Sciences
- College of Science
- College of Veterinary Medicine

Said Sadiq Campus:

- College of Humanities Education

Chwarta Campus:

- College of Environmental Sciences

Bakrajo Campus:

- College of Agricultural Engineering Science

In 2025, the university also announced a new College of National Security to open in the 2025-2026 school year.

The university also has several specialized centers: the Kurdology Center, the Cisco Center (for IT networking), the Gender Equality Center, the Career Development Center, the Language and Culture Center, the Center for Pedagogical Training and Academic Development, and the Kurdistan Center for Documentation and Academic Research.

The university also awards MA, MSc and PhD degrees in different fields of study. In the 2009–2010 academic year, 24,488 students attended classes as full-time students, alongside 924 postgraduate students, 1357 teaching staff, and 2329 administrative staff members.

=== New campus ===
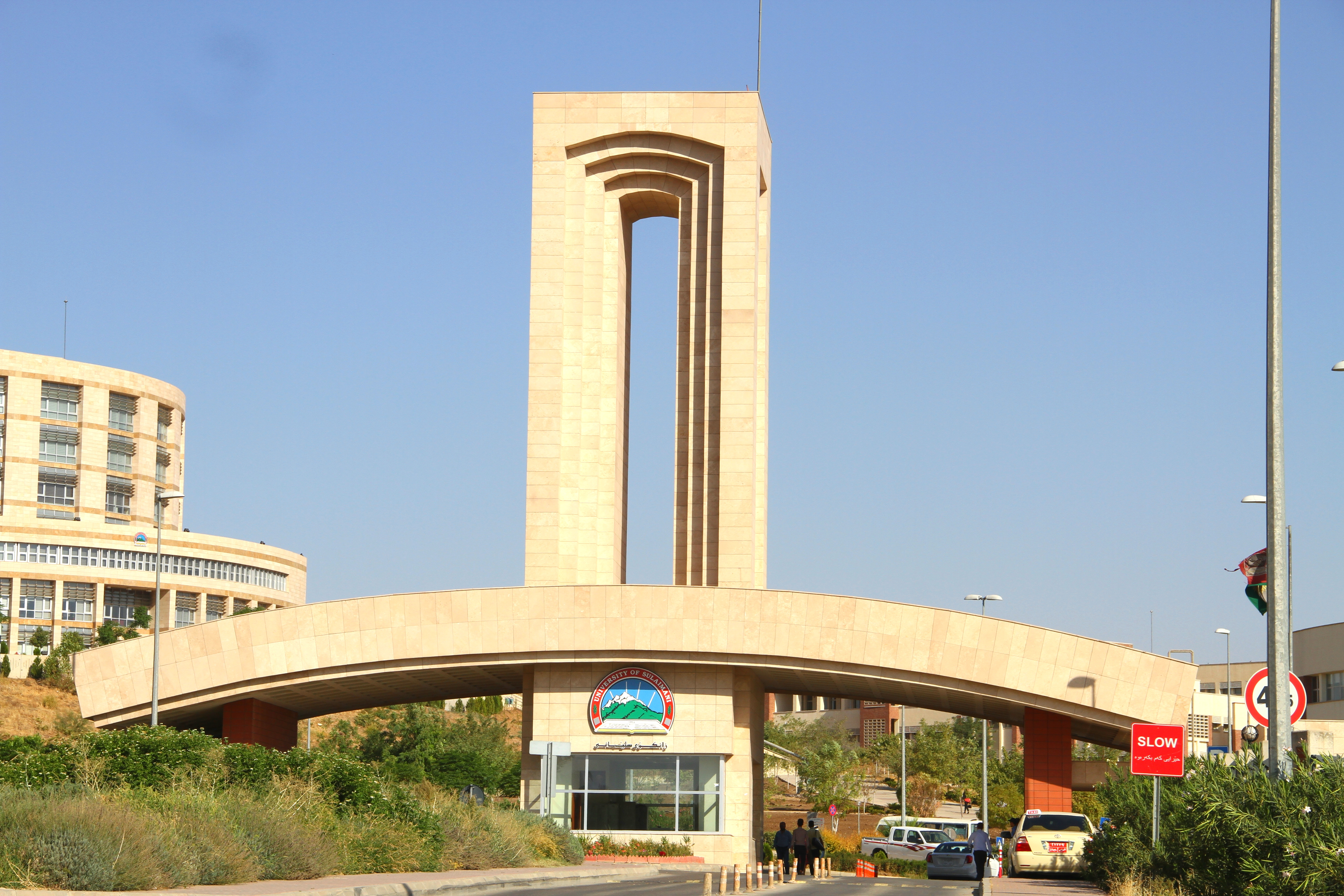
New Campus Entrance

The "new campus" of the university is located at the outskirts of Sulaymaniyah. Construction was completed in 2012 with a budget of nearly 450 million US dollars, making it one of the largest campuses in the region. The colleges of Medicine, Dentistry, Pharmacy, and Nursing remained in the old campus.

== See also ==
- List of universities in Iraq

== Official Website ==
- University of Sulaimani
