= List of pharmacy schools in the United States =

This is a list of schools of pharmacy in the United States. Delaware and Vermont are the only two states without a pharmacy school.

== Current pharmacy schools ==
Accreditation Status based on Accreditation Council for Pharmacy Education

Candidate Status	Precandidate Status	Discontinued/Merged	Withdrawn

=== Alabama ===
School	City	University	Est.
Harrison School of Pharmacy	Auburn, Mobile	Auburn University	1885
McWhorter School of Pharmacy	Birmingham	Samford University	1927

=== Alaska ===
School	City	University	Est.
UAA/ISU Doctor of Pharmacy Program	Anchorage	University of Alaska Anchorage	2016

=== Arizona ===
School	City	University	Est.
College of Pharmacy - Glendale	Glendale	Midwestern University	1998
R. K. Coit College of Pharmacy	Tucson	University of Arizona	1947

=== Arkansas ===
School	City	University	Est.
College of Pharmacy	Searcy	Harding University	2008
College of Pharmacy	Little Rock	University of Arkansas for Medical Sciences	1951

=== California ===
School	City	University	Est.
School of Pharmacy	Irvine	Chapman University	2014
College of Pharmacy	Elk Grove	California Northstate University	2007
School of Pharmacy	Claremont	Keck Graduate Institute	2013
School of Pharmacy	Loma Linda	Loma Linda University	2000
College of Pharmacy	Fullerton	Marshall B. Ketchum University	2016
College of Pharmacy	Vallejo	Touro University	1997
College of Pharmacy	Irvine	University of California-Irvine	2021
Skaggs School of Pharmacy & Pharmaceutical Sciences	La Jolla	University of California-San Diego	2000
School of Pharmacy	San Francisco	University of California-San Francisco	1872
Thomas J. Long School of Pharmacy & Health Science	Stockton	University of the Pacific	1956
Alfred E. Mann School of Pharmacy and Pharmaceutical Sciences	Los Angeles	University of Southern California	1905
College of Pharmacy	Los Angeles	West Coast University	2013
College of Pharmacy	Pomona	Western University of Health Sciences	1996
School of Pharmacy	Signal Hill	American University of Health Sciences	2017

=== Colorado ===
School	City	University	Est.
Skaggs School of Pharmacy and Pharmaceutical Sciences	Aurora	University of Colorado Denver	1911
Rueckert-Hartman College for Health Professions	Denver	Regis University	2007

=== Connecticut ===
School	City	University	Est.
School of Pharmacy	Hartford	Saint Joseph University	2011
School of Pharmacy	Storrs	University of Connecticut	1925

=== District of Columbia ===
School	City	University	Est.
College of Pharmacy	Washington, DC	Howard University	1868

=== Florida ===
School	City	University	Est.
College of Pharmacy and Pharmaceutical Sciences	Tallahassee, Crestview	Florida Agricultural and Mechanical University	1887
Barry and Judy Silverman College of Pharmacy	Fort Lauderdale	Nova Southeastern University	1987
LECOM School of Pharmacy Bradenton Campus	Bradenton	Lake Erie College of Osteopathic Medicine	2007
College of Pharmacy	Miami	Larkin University	2016
Lloyd L. Gregory School of Pharmacy	West Palm Beach	Palm Beach Atlantic University	2001
College of Pharmacy	Gainesville	University of Florida	1923
Taneja College of Pharmacy	Tampa	University of South Florida	2009

=== Georgia ===
School	City	University	Est.
College of Pharmacy and Health Sciences	Atlanta	Mercer University	1903
School of Pharmacy–Georgia Campus	Suwanee	Philadelphia College of Osteopathic Medicine	2010
School of Pharmacy	Savannah	South University	2003
College of Pharmacy	Athens	University of Georgia	1903

=== Hawaii ===
School	City	University	Est.
Daniel K. Inouye College of Pharmacy	Hilo	University of Hawaii at Hilo	2010

=== Idaho ===
School	City	University	Est.
College of Pharmacy	Pocatello	Idaho State University	1918

=== Illinois ===
School	City	University	Est.
College of Pharmacy	Chicago	Chicago State University	2007
Chicago College of Pharmacy	Downers Grove	Midwestern University	1991
College of Pharmacy	Schaumburg	Roosevelt University	2011
College of Pharmacy	North Chicago	Rosalind Franklin University of Medicine and Science	2009
SIUE School of Pharmacy	Edwardsville	Southern Illinois University Edwardsville	2005
UIC College of Pharmacy	Chicago	University of Illinois at Chicago	1859

=== Indiana ===
School	City	University	Est.
College of Pharmacy and Health Sciences	Indianapolis	Butler University	1904
College of Pharmacy	Fort Wayne	Manchester University	2011
College of Pharmacy	West Lafayette	Purdue University	1884

=== Iowa ===
School	City	University	Est.
College of Pharmacy and Health Sciences	Des Moines	Drake University	1939
College of Pharmacy	Iowa City	University of Iowa	1885

=== Kansas ===
School	City	University	Est.
School of Pharmacy	Lawrence	University of Kansas	1885

=== Kentucky ===
School	City	University	Est.
College of Pharmacy	Louisville	Sullivan University	2008
College of Pharmacy	Lexington	University of Kentucky	1870

=== Louisiana ===
School	City	University	Est.
College of Pharmacy	Monroe	University of Louisiana at Monroe	1956
College of Pharmacy	New Orleans	Xavier University of Louisiana	1927

=== Maine ===
School	City	University	Est.
School of Pharmacy	Bangor	Husson University	2007
School of Pharmacy	Portland	University of New England	2007

=== Maryland ===
School	City	University	Est.
School of Pharmacy	Baltimore	University of Maryland, Baltimore	1841
School of Pharmacy	Baltimore	Notre Dame of Maryland University	2008
School of Pharmacy	Princess Anne	University of Maryland Eastern Shore	2010

=== Massachusetts ===
School	City	University	Est.
School of Pharmacy-Boston	Boston	Massachusetts College of Pharmacy and Health Sciences	1823
School of Pharmacy–Worcester	Worcester	Massachusetts College of Pharmacy and Health Sciences	2009
School of Pharmacy	Boston	Northeastern University	1927
College of Pharmacy and Health Sciences	Springfield	Western New England University	2011

=== Michigan ===
School	City	University	Est.
College of Pharmacy	Big Rapids	Ferris State University	1893
College of Pharmacy	Ann Arbor	University of Michigan	1876
Eugene Applebaum College of Pharmacy and Health Sciences	Detroit	Wayne State University	1924

=== Minnesota ===
School	City	University	Est.
College of Pharmacy	Minneapolis	University of Minnesota	1892
College of Pharmacy	Duluth	University of Minnesota Duluth	2003

=== Mississippi ===
School	City	University	Est.
School of Pharmacy	University	University of Mississippi	1908
School of Pharmacy	Biloxi	William Carey University (Tradition Campus)	2018

=== Missouri ===
School	City	University	Est.
St. Louis College of Pharmacy	St. Louis	University of Health Sciences and Pharmacy in St. Louis	1864
School of Pharmacy	Kansas City	University of Missouri–Kansas City	1885

=== Montana ===
School	City	University	Est.
Skaggs School of Pharmacy	Missoula	University of Montana	1907

=== Nebraska ===
School	City	University	Est.
School of Pharmacy and Health Professions	Omaha	Creighton University	1905
College of Pharmacy	Omaha	University of Nebraska Medical Center	1881

=== Nevada ===
School	City	University	Est.
College of Pharmacy	Henderson	Roseman University of Health Sciences	1999

=== New Hampshire ===
School	City	University	Est.
School of Pharmacy	Manchester	Massachusetts College of Pharmacy and Health Sciences	

=== New Jersey ===
School	City	University	Est.
School of Pharmacy	Florham Park	Fairleigh Dickinson University	2010
Ernest Mario School of Pharmacy	Piscataway	Rutgers, The State University of New Jersey	1892

=== New Mexico ===
School	City	University	Est.
College of Pharmacy	Albuquerque	University of New Mexico	1945

=== New York ===
School	City	University	Est.
Albany College of Pharmacy	Albany	Albany College of Pharmacy and Health Sciences	1881
School of Pharmacy and Pharmaceutical Sciences	Binghamton	Binghamton University, State University of New York	2017
School of Pharmacy	Buffalo	D'Youville University	2010
Arnold and Marie Schwartz College of Pharmacy	Brooklyn	Long Island University	1886
College of Pharmacy and Health Professions	Queens	St. John's University	1929
Wegmans School of Pharmacy	Rochester	St. John Fisher University	2006
Touro College of Pharmacy	New York	Touro College	2008
University at Buffalo School of Pharmacy and Pharmaceutical Sciences	Buffalo	University at Buffalo, The State University of New York	1886

=== North Carolina ===
School	City	University	Est.
College of Pharmacy & Health Sciences	Buies Creek	Campbell University	1986
Fred Wilson School of Pharmacy	High Point	High Point University	2016
UNC Eshelman School of Pharmacy	Chapel Hill Asheville	University of North Carolina at Chapel Hill (branch campus located at UNCA)	1897
School of Pharmacy	Wingate	Wingate University	2002

=== North Dakota ===
School	City	University	Est.
College of Pharmacy, Nursing, and Allied Sciences	Fargo	North Dakota State University	1890

=== Ohio ===
School	City	University	Est.
School of Pharmacy	Cedarville	Cedarville University	2009
College of Pharmacy	Rootstown	Northeast Ohio Medical University	2005
Raabe College of Pharmacy	Ada	Ohio Northern University	1884
College of Pharmacy	Columbus	Ohio State University	1885
James L. Winkle College of Pharmacy	Cincinnati	University of Cincinnati	1850
College of Pharmacy	Findlay	University of Findlay	2004
College of Pharmacy & Pharmaceutical Sciences	Toledo	University of Toledo	1904

=== Oklahoma ===
School	City	University	Est.
College of Pharmacy	Oklahoma City	University of Oklahoma	1893
College of Pharmacy	Weatherford	Southwestern Oklahoma State University	1939

=== Oregon ===
School	City	University	Est.
College of Pharmacy	Corvallis	Oregon State University	1898
School of Pharmacy	Hillsboro	Pacific University Oregon	2006

=== Pennsylvania ===
School	City	University	Est.
School of Pharmacy	Pittsburgh	Duquesne University	1925
School of Pharmacy - Erie Campus	Erie	Lake Erie College of Osteopathic Medicine	2002
School of Pharmacy	Philadelphia	Temple University	1901
Jefferson School of Pharmacy	Philadelphia	Thomas Jefferson University	2008
Philadelphia College of Pharmacy	Philadelphia	University of the Sciences	1821
School of Pharmacy	Pittsburgh	University of Pittsburgh	1876
Nesbitt School of Pharmacy	Wilkes-Barre	Wilkes University	1996

=== Puerto Rico ===
School	City	University	Est.
School of Pharmacy	San Juan	University of Puerto Rico	1913

=== Rhode Island ===
School	City	University	Est.
College of Pharmacy	Kingston	University of Rhode Island	1957

=== South Carolina ===
School	City	University	Est.
College of Pharmacy	Columbia	University of South Carolina	1865
South Carolina College of Pharmacy	Charleston	Medical University of South Carolina	1894
School of Pharmacy	Clinton	Presbyterian College	2010
School of Pharmacy	Columbia	South University	2003
South Carolina College of Pharmacy	Columbia	University of South Carolina	1865

=== South Dakota ===
School	City	University	Est.
College of Pharmacy	Brookings	South Dakota State University	1888

=== Tennessee ===
School	City	University	Est.
College of Pharmacy	Nashville	Belmont University	2008
Bill Gatton College of Pharmacy	Johnson City	East Tennessee State University	2005
College of Pharmacy	Nashville	Lipscomb University	2006
School of Pharmacy	Knoxville	South College	2012
School of Pharmacy	Jackson	Union University	2008
College of Pharmacy	Memphis	University of Tennessee	1898

=== Texas ===
School	City	University	Est.
Irma Lerma Rangel College of Pharmacy	Kingsville, Bryan	Texas A&M Health Science Center	2006
College of Pharmacy and Health Sciences	Houston	Texas Southern University	1949
School of Pharmacy	Amarillo	Texas Tech University Health Sciences Center	1993
College of Pharmacy	Houston	University of Houston	1946
College of Pharmacy	Austin	University of Texas at Austin	1893
School of Pharmacy	El Paso	University of Texas at El Paso	2017
Fisch College of Pharmacy	Tyler	University of Texas at Tyler	2015
Feik School of Pharmacy	San Antonio	University of the Incarnate Word	2006
UNT System College of Pharmacy	Fort Worth	University of North Texas Health Science Center	2011

=== Utah ===
School	City	University	Est.
College of Pharmacy	South Jordan	Roseman University of Health Sciences	1999
College of Pharmacy	Salt Lake City	University of Utah	1946

=== Virginia ===
School	City	University	Est.
College of Pharmacy	Oakwood	Appalachian College of Pharmacy	2003
School of Pharmacy	Hampton	Hampton University	1997
Bernard J. Dunn School of Pharmacy	Winchester/Fairfax	Shenandoah University	1996
School of Pharmacy	Richmond	Virginia Commonwealth University	1898

=== Washington ===
School	City	University	Est.
School of Pharmacy	Seattle	University of Washington	1894
College of Pharmacy	Spokane	Washington State University	1905

=== West Virginia ===
School	City	University	Est.
School of Pharmacy	Huntington	Marshall University	2012
School of Pharmacy	Charleston	University of Charleston	1998
School of Pharmacy	Morgantown	West Virginia University	1914

=== Wisconsin ===
School	City	University	Est.
School of Pharmacy	Mequon	Concordia University Wisconsin	2010
School of Pharmacy	Milwaukee	Medical College of Wisconsin	2017
School of Pharmacy	Madison	University of Wisconsin–Madison	1883

=== Wyoming ===
School	City	University	Est.
School of Pharmacy	Laramie	University of Wyoming	1946

== See also ==
- History of pharmacy
- List of medical schools
