= Jill Kolesar =

American pharmacist

Jill M. Kolesar is an American pharmacist, cancer researcher, and professor, currently serving as the dean and Jean M. Schmidt Chair in Drug Discovery at the University of Iowa College of Pharmacy. She specializes in precision oncology, drug development, and molecular pharmacology, with contributions to cancer therapy, particularly for rural and underserved populations.

== Education ==
Kolesar, a first-generation college student, earned her B.S. in Pharmacy from the University of Wisconsin-Madison in 1990. She completed her Doctor of Pharmacy degree at the University of Texas Health Science Center in San Antonio, where she also completed her residency and a fellowship in oncology. She later obtained a Master of Science in Epidemiology from the University of Wisconsin-Madison School of Medicine and Public Health, focusing on genetic epidemiology.

== Career and research ==
Before becoming dean of the University of Iowa College of Pharmacy in 2024, Kolesar spent nearly two decades making contributions to pharmacy education, cancer research, and improving cancer outcomes. Kolesar started her academic career at the University of Wisconsin-Madison School of Pharmacy in 1996. She was hired as a Professor of Pharmacy at the University of Kentucky in 2016 and was appointed the Dr. Michael E. Karpf Endowed Chair in Precision Medicine at the University of Kentucky Markey Cancer Center in 2022.

At the Markey Cancer Center, she co-led the Translational Oncology Research Program, where she oversaw a significant expansion in program funding and contributed substantially to the successful effort for Markey to earn designation as Kentucky's only Comprehensive Cancer Center from the National Cancer Institute (NCI). She also established and led a state-wide Molecular Tumor Board (MTB), which reviewed over 3,000 cases and provided oncologists throughout the Commonwealth of Kentucky with access to genomic testing and personalized treatment plans. She also completed clinical trials to assess the impact of MTB reviews, demonstrating how the approach positively impacted patient outcomes, particularly in underserved areas of Kentucky.

As a researcher, Kolesar focuses on cancer drug development. She also pioneered the use of engineered extracellular vesicles to treat ovarian and other cancers, an approach that has demonstrated significant potential to advance cancer therapy. Following the breakthrough, Kolesar founded VesiCure Technologies, a biotech company focused on developing novel cancer treatments. She has received more than $15 million in research funding from organizations such as the NCI and the American Cancer Society. Kolesar has published more than 160 research articles and her work has been cited more than 8,000 times.

In October 2024, Kolesar was awarded a $10 million research award from the White House's Advanced Research Projects Agency for Health to develop a new method for fighting ovarian cancer.

In addition to her leadership in cancer research and policy impact, Kolesar is also known for her contributions to pharmacy education, having co-authored the widely used McGraw Hill Pharmacy Drug Cards flashcard series and the textbook Pharmacotherapy Principles and Practice.

== Public service and leadership ==
Kolesar is currently the chair of the Oncology Research Information Exchange Network (ORIEN) Steering Committee, a consortium of 19 cancer centers across the U.S. that share data and collaborate on cancer research. She previously served as president of the American College of Clinical Pharmacy (ACCP) and has served on multiple study sections, a cancer therapy task force, and the Investigational Drug Steering Committee for the NCI.

== Honors and awards ==
- Innovations in Teaching Award, American Association of Colleges of Pharmacy (2001)
- Fellow, American College of Clinical Pharmacy (2002)
