= List of Kappa Epsilon chapters =

Kappa Epsilon is an American professional women's pharmacy fraternity founded in Iowa in 1921.

== Collegiate chapters ==
In the following list of Kappa Epsilon collegiate chapters, active chapters are indicated in bold and inactive chapters are in italics.

Chapter	Charter date and range	Institution	City	State	Status	Ref.
**Alpha**	May 13, 1921	University of Minnesota College of Pharmacy	Minneapolis	Minnesota	Active	(Note: Alpha chapter was formed from the local pharmacy club, originally called the Spatula Club and later known as Kappa Epsilon. It was also the namesake for the national fraternity.)
**Beta**	May 13, 1921	University of Nebraska Medical Center College of Pharmacy	Omaha	Nebraska	Active	
Gamma	May 13, 1921	University of Iowa	Iowa City	Iowa	Inactive	(Note: Gamma chapter was formed by absorbing the local pharmacy club, the Crucible Club.)
**Delta**	June 10, 1922	University of Montana Skaggs School of Pharmacy	Missoula	Montana	Active	
Epsilon	February 19, 1926	Ohio State University	Columbus	Ohio	Inactive	
Zeta	April 21, 1926	University of Wisconsin–Madison	Madison	Wisconsin	Inactive	
Eta	November 30, 1928	Western Reserve University	Cleveland	Ohio	Inactive	
Theta	May 23, 1930	University of Colorado Boulder	Boulder	Colorado	Inactive	
Iota	May 29, 1930	North Dakota State University	Fargo	North Dakota	Inactive	
**Kappa**	May 12, 1939	University of Florida College of Pharmacy	Gainesville	Florida	Active	
**Lambda**	January 12, 1940	University of North Carolina at Chapel Hill Eshelman School of Pharmacy	Chapel Hill	North Carolina	Active	
**Mu**	May 13, 1942	University of Kansas School of Pharmacy	Lawrence	Kansas	Active	
Nu	November 19, 1942	Loyola University of the South	New Orleans	Louisiana	Inactive	
**Xi**	March 21, 1943	University of Texas at Austin	Austin	Texas	Active	(Note: Xi chapter was formed by absorbing the local pharmacy organization Mortar and Pestle Club.)
Omicron	February 22, 1945	Philadelphia College of Pharmacy and Science	Philadelphia	Philadelphia	Inactive	
**Pi**	April 1, 1948	Purdue University	West Lafayette	Indiana	Active	
**Rho**	February 4, 1949	University of Cincinnati James L Winkle College of Pharmacy	Cincinnati	Ohio	Active	
**Sigma**	October 28, 1951	University of Arizona R. K. Coit College of Pharmacy	Tucson	Arizona	Active	
**Tau**	May 20, 1953	School of Pharmacy Medical College of Virginia	Richmond	Virginia	Active	
**Upsilon**	March 5, 1953	University of Houston	Houston	Texas	Active	
Phi	January 28, 1956	Auburn University	Auburn	Alabama	Inactive	
**Chi**	May 24, 1956	South Dakota State University	Brookings	South Dakato	Active	(Note: Chi chapter formed by absorbing the local Galen Society, established in February 1955.)
**Psi**	December 4, 1957	Ohio Northern University	Ada	Ohio	Active	
**Omega**	April 12, 1958	University of Missouri-Kansas City	Kansas City	Missouri	Active	
Alpha Alpha	April 10, 1959	University of Utah	Salt Lake City	Utah	Inactive	
**Alpha Beta**	January 28, 1960	Southwestern Oklahoma State University	Weatherford	Oklahoma	Active	
**Alpha Gamma**	May 12, 1960	University of Mississippi Pharmacy School	Oxford	Mississippi	Active	(Note: Alpha Gamma chapter formed by absorbing the local group, The Pill and Tile Club.)
**Alpha Delta**	May 20, 1960	Mercer University College of Pharmacy	Atlanta	Georgia	Active	
**Alpha Epsilon**	October 15, 1960	University of Louisiana at Monroe College of Pharmacy	Monroe	Louisiana	Active	
Alpha Zeta	May 15, 1961	George Washington University	Washington	District of Columbia	Inactive	
Alpha Eta	April 13, 1962 – 1966	University of Puerto Rico	San Juan	Puerto Rico	Inactive	
**Alpha Theta**	April 25, 1964	University of Arkansas for Medical Sciences	Little Rock	Arkansas	Active	
Alpha Iota	April 24, 1965	University of Oklahoma	Oklahoma City	Oklahoma	Inactive	
Alpha Kappa	April 30, 1965	University of Wyoming	Laramie	Wyoming	Inactive	
**Alpha Lambda**	October 22, 1966	South Carolina College of Pharmacy	Columbia	South Carolina	Active	
Alpha Mu	December 7, 1968	University of New Mexico	Albuquerque	New Mexico	Inactive	
**Alpha Nu**	November 24, 1978	Xavier University	Cincinnati	Ohio	Active	
**Alpha Xi**	February 13, 1971	Florida A&M University	Tallahassee	Florida	Active	(Note: Alpha Xi chapter formed by absorbing the local Alpha Chi Pharmacy Club.)
**Alpha Omicron**	May 1980	University of Health Sciences and Pharmacy in St. Louis	St. Louis	Missouri	Active	
**Alpha Pi**	1984	Howard University	Washington	District of Columbia	Active	
**Alpha Rho**	August 1987	Campbell University	Buies Creek	North Carolina	Active	
**Alpha Phi**	October 17, 1999	Duquesne University	Pittsburgh	Pennsylvania	Active	
**Alpha Chi**		Shenandoah University	Winchester	Virginia	Active	
**Alpha Psi**		Palm Beach Atlantic University	West Palm Beach	Florida	Active	
**Alpha Omega**		University of Florida	Gainesville	Florida	Active	
**Beta Alpha**		University of Florida College of Pharmacy	Jacksonville	Florida	Active	
**Beta Beta**	April 30, 2004	University of Florida College of Pharmacy	Orlando	Florida	Active	
**Beta Gamma**		South University School of Pharmacy	Savannah	Georgia	Active	
**Beta Epsilon**	2008	University of Mississippi	Oxford	Mississippi	Active	
**Beta Zeta**	February 18, 2009	University of Findlay College of Pharmacy	Findlay	Ohio	Active	
**Beta Eta**		East Tennessee State University	Johnson City	Tennessee	Active	
**Beta Theta**	December 12, 2009	University of the Incarnate Word Feik School of Pharmacy	San Antonio	Texas	Active	
**Beta Iota**	May 2010	Lake Erie College of Osteopathic Medicine	Bradenton	Florida	Active	
**Beta Kappa**	October 29, 2012	Presbyterian College School of Pharmacy	Clinton	South Carolina	Active	
**Beta Lambda**	February 18, 2013	University of Kansas School of Pharmacy	Wichita	Kansas	Active	
**Beta Mu**		University of North Carolina at Asheville	Asheville	North Carolina	Active	
**Beta Nu colony**		South University School of Pharmacy	Columbia	South Carolina	Active	
**Beta Omicron**	March 4, 2014	Wingate University School of Pharmacy	Wingate	North Carolina	Active	
**Beta Pi**		Concordia University Wisconsin School of Pharmacy	Mequon	Wisconsin	Active	
**Beta Rho**	May 2, 2015	Midwestern University College of Pharmacy	Glendale	Arizona	Active	
**Beta Tau**	February 26, 2016	University of South Florida College of Pharmacy	Tampa	Florida	Active	
**Beta Sigma**	April 5, 2016	Philadelphia College of Osteopathic Medicine	Suwanee	Georgia	Active	

== Alumni chapters ==
Following are the alumni chapters of Kappa Epsilon. Active chapters are indicated in bold. Inactive chapters are in italic.

Chapter	Charter date and range	City	State	Status	Ref.
**Twin City Alumni**	1924	Minneapolis and Saint Paul	Minnesota	Active	(Note: This chapter was initially called Alpha Alumnae.)
Gamma Alumnae	1927	Iowa City	Iowa	Inactive	
Zeta Alumnae	1929	Madison	Wisconsin	Inactive	
**Cleveland Alumni**	1930	Cleveland	Ohio	Active	(Note: This chapter was initially called the Eta Alumnae.)
Beta Alumnae	1932	Omaha	Nebraska	Inactive	
Nu Alumnae	1944	New Orleans	Louisiana	Inactive	
Iota Alumnae	1949	Fargo	North Dakota	Inactive	
Omincron Alumnae	1949	Philadelphia	Pennsylvania	Inactive	
Delta Alumnae	1950	Missoula	Montana	Inactive	
**Columbus Alumni**	1951	Columbus	Ohio	Active	(Note: This chapter was initially called Epsilon Alumnae.)
Mu Alumnae	1952	Lawrence	Kansas	Inactive	
Xi Alumnae	1952	Austin	Texas	Inactive	
Rho Alumnae	1952	Cincinnati	Ohio	Inactive	
Chicago Alumnae	1954	Chicago	Illinois	Inactive	
Colorado Alumnae	1957		Colorado	Inactive	
Quint City Alumnae	1961	Davenport, Rock Island, Moline, and Bettendorf	Iowa and Illinois	Inactive	
Kansas City Alumnae	1961	Kansas City	Missouri	Inactive	
**Indiana Alumni**	1962		Indiana	Active	
District of Columnia Alumnae	1963	Washington, D.C.		Inactive	
Louisiana Alumnae	1968		Louisiana	Inactive	
Arkansas Alumnae	1968		Arkansas	Inactive	
South Carolina Alumnae	1970		South Carolina	Inactive	
Atlanta Alumnae	1970	Atlanta	Georgia	Inactive	
New Mexico Alumnae	1973		New Mexico	Inactive	
Tar Heel Alumnae	1973		North Carolina	Inactive	
**Dallas–Ft Worth Alumni**	1974–19xx ?; 1997	Dallas and Fort Worth	Texas	Active	
Puerto Rico Alumnae	1974		Puerto Rico	Inactive	
Arizonza Alumnae	1975		Arizona	Inactive	
Central Texas Alumnae	1977		Texas	Inactive	
Houston Alumnae	1977	Houston	Texas	Inactive	
Wisconsin Alumnae	1977		Wisconsin	Inactive	
**Florida Alumni**	1981		Florida	Active	
**Phoenix Alumni**	1982	Phoenix	Arizona	Active	
**Greater Kansas City Alumni**	1997	Kansas City	Missouri	Active	
**Charleston Alumni**	2006	Charleston	South Carolina	Active	
**Greater Pittsburgh Alumni**	2006	Pittsburgh	Pennsylvania	Active	
**Greater Atlanta Alumni**	2008	Atlanta	Georgia	Active	
**Greater Triangle Alumni**	2008	Raleigh, Durham, and Chapel Hill	North Carolina	Active	
**Greater Richmond Virginia Alumni**	2009	Richmond	Virginia	Active	
**Greensboro Alumni**	2009	Greensboro	North Carolina	Active	
