= Joseph T. DiPiro =

- Education: University of Connecticut, University of Kentucky
- Occupations: Pharmacist, academic

Joseph T. DiPiro is professor and Associate Vice President of Health Sciences for Faculty Affairs at Virginia Commonwealth University. From 2014 to 2022 he was Dean and Archie O. McCalley Chair at the VCU School of Pharmacy.

== Education ==
DiPiro received his Bachelor of Science degree in Pharmacy from the University of Connecticut and Doctor of Pharmacy from the University of Kentucky. He completed a residency at the University of Kentucky Medical Center and a fellowship in clinical immunology at Johns Hopkins University.

== Career ==
Before arriving at the VCU School of Pharmacy on July 1, 2014, DiPiro served as professor and executive dean of the South Carolina College of Pharmacy, an integrated program of the Colleges of Pharmacy of the University of South Carolina and the Medical University of South Carolina.

Prior to his tenure at South Carolina, he was the Panoz Professor of Pharmacy at the University of Georgia College of Pharmacy and clinical professor of surgery at the Medical College of Georgia. While there, he was also assistant dean for the College of Pharmacy and the School of Medicine at the Medical College of Georgia as well as head of the Department of Clinical and Administrative Pharmacy.

== Writing ==
DiPiro served as editor of The American Journal of Pharmaceutical Education, the official publication of the American Association of Colleges of Pharmacy, from 2002 to 2014. DiPiro has published more than 200 articles in academic and professional journals, mainly related to antibiotics, drug use in surgery, various issues in pharmacy practice and pharmacy education.

His papers have appeared in Antimicrobial Agents and Chemotherapy, Pharmacotherapy, Critical Care Medicine, JAMA, Annals of Surgery, Archives of Surgery, American Journal of Surgery, Journal of Pharmacology and Experimental Therapeutics, and Surgical Infections.

Pharmacotherapy: A Pathophysiologic Approach, for which DiPiro is the senior editor, is used by American pharmacy students and is in its 12th edition. He is also the author of Concepts in Clinical Pharmacokinetics and editor of the Encyclopedia of Clinical Pharmacy.

== Memberships and awards ==
DiPiro is past president of the American College of Clinical Pharmacy. He is an ACCP fellow and has served on the Research Institute Board of Trustees. He has been a member of the Surgical Infection Society Therapeutic Agents Committee and the American Society of Health-System Pharmacists, having served on the Commission on Therapeutics and the Task Force on Science. In 2002, the American Association of Colleges of Pharmacy selected DiPiro for the Robert K. Chalmers Distinguished Educator Award. He also received the Education Award from the American College of Clinical Pharmacy in 2004, the Russell R. Miller Literature Award in 1998, and the Award for Sustained Contributions to the Literature from the American Society of Health-System Pharmacists in 1992.
