= Society of Infectious Diseases Pharmacists =

Professional medical association

- Abbreviation: SIDP
- Formation: 1990
- Type: Professional association
- Headquarters: Geneva, Illinois
- Location: United States
- Members: 2000+ (2023)
- President: Erin McCreary, PharmD, BCIDP
- President-Elect: Lisa Dumkow, PharmD, BCIDP, FIDP
- Past President: Sam Aitken, PharmD, MPH
- Website: https://www.sidp.org/

The Society of Infectious Diseases Pharmacists (SIDP) is a non-profit organization comprising pharmacists and other allied health professionals specializing in infectious diseases and antimicrobial stewardship. According to the Board of Pharmaceutical Specialties, clinical pharmacists specializing in infectious diseases are trained in microbiology and pharmacology to develop, implement, and monitor drug regimens. These regimens incorporate the pharmacodynamics and pharmacokinetics of antimicrobials for patients.

Headquartered in Geneva, Illinois, SIDP was founded in 1990 and has over 2,000 members engaged in patient care, research, teaching, the pharmaceutical industry, and government. The organization's mission is to advance infectious diseases pharmacy through collaboration, research, and education, and to lead antimicrobial stewardship to optimize patient care in various practice settings. To achieve its mission, SIDP collaborates with several healthcare organizations, including the Infectious Diseases Society of America (IDSA), American College of Clinical Pharmacy (ACCP), Society for Healthcare Epidemiology of America (SHEA) and American Society for Microbiology (ASM), American Society of Health-System Pharmacists (ASHP), Clinical and Laboratory Standards Institute (CLSI), European Society of Clinical Microbiology and Infectious Diseases (ESCMID), European Society of Clinical Pharmacy (ESCP), Making a Difference in Infectious Diseases (MAD-ID), and International Pharmaceutical Federation (FIP).

== Advocacy for Antimicrobial Stewardship ==
The World Health Organization and Centers for Disease Control and Prevention have identified antimicrobial resistance as a significant public health threat. SIDP prioritizes promoting the appropriate use of antimicrobials and reducing resistance. In 2003, SIDP warned of a potential exponential increase in antibiotic-resistant bacteria. In 2009, SIDP supported a study that identified antibiotics with a lower likelihood of contributing to antibiotic resistance. The SIDP Policy and Government Affairs (PGA) Committee focuses on legislative and regulatory issues related to infectious disease therapeutics, antimicrobial use, and resistance. The SIDP Public Outreach Committee develops partnerships, activities, and programs to educate the public on the safe and effective use of antimicrobials and the role of pharmacists in antimicrobial stewardship. The SIDP Diversity, Equity, and Inclusion (DEI) Committee is dedicated to creating a welcoming society and improving minority representation within its membership, leadership, and the profession. SIDP advocates to government and private entities on key issues and collaborates with strategic partners to educate the public and promote positive change.

=== Presidential Advisory Council on Combating Antibiotic-Resistant Bacteria (PACCARB) ===
In January 2019, the Presidential Advisory Council on Combating Antibiotic-Resistant Bacteria (PACCARB) convened to respond to a directive from the United States Secretary of Health and Human Services, Alex Azar, to gather public input on strategies to combat antimicrobial resistance. Former SIDP president Kerry LaPlante presented public comments emphasizing the need to prioritize the acceleration of research and development of new antimicrobials through innovative funding mechanisms, safeguard the supply of existing drugs, and develop strategies to mitigate shortages of anti-infective medications. LaPlante said, "Together, we scramble to concoct mixtures of antibiotics, using in vitro data, hoping to override resistance and hoping for synergy to save our dying patients. Many of these patients have already endured and overcome months of chemotherapy, only to find themselves kicked down and fighting for their lives – again." In September 2020, In September 2020, Elizabeth Dodds-Ashley, a former SIDP president, was appointed as a designated representative to the Presidential Advisory Council on Combating Antibiotic-Resistant Bacteria (PACCARB).

=== U.S. Government Antimicrobial Resistance (AMR) Challenge ===
The U.S. Government Antimicrobial Resistance (AMR) Challenge, initiated in 2018, is a global effort that calls upon pharmaceutical and health insurance companies, food animal producers and purchasers, medical professionals, government health officials, and industry leaders worldwide to collaborate in combating antibiotic resistance. The AMR Challenge is a way for organizations to make formal commitments to further the progress against antimicrobial resistance.

SIDP has submitted a commitment to the AMR Challenge to promote appropriate antimicrobial use. As part of this commitment, in 2019, SIDP collaborated with the Centers for Disease Control and Prevention and the American Society of Health-System Pharmacists to develop educational materials on how pharmacists can improve antimicrobial use. Healthcare providers can submit a formal commitment to adopt these practices.

According to Secretary Azar, nearly 350 national and international organizations have committed to the AMR Challenge, including Infectious Diseases Society of America, American Academy of Emergency Medicine, American Cancer Society, Pew Charitable Trusts, and the U.S. Department of Defense

=== Pioneering Antimicrobial Subscriptions To End Upsurging Resistance Act of 2023 (PASTEUR Act of 2023) ===
Globally, an estimated 4.95 million deaths were associated with bacterial antimicrobial resistance (AMR) in 2019, with 1.27 million deaths attributed directly to bacterial AMR. The purpose of the PASTEUR Act of 2023 is to establish a program aimed at developing antimicrobials targeting difficult-to-treat bacterial and fungal pathogens, as well as addressing the most threatening infections, among other objectives. SIDP is among the 237 organizations that advocated for the advancement of the PASTEUR Act in 2023.

== Legislative Support ==
On June 4, 2019, United States Senators Johnny Isakson (R-GA) and Bob Casey (D-PA) introduced the Developing an Innovative Strategy for Antimicrobial Resistant Microorganisms (DISARM) Act S. 1712. The DISARM Act aims to advance antibiotic research and development, as well as preserve existing antibiotics. It proposes improvements to Medicare reimbursement for antibiotics and promotes their appropriate use. SIDP joined other medical organizations such as Infectious Diseases Society of America, American Academy of Allergy, Asthma and Immunology and American Society for Microbiology in signing a letter of support for the DISARM Act.

Similarly, SIDP and other infectious diseases organizations have endorsed the Strategies to Address Antimicrobial Resistance Act (STAAR), which seeks to enhance the current federal infrastructure for surveillance, data collection, and research endeavors related to antimicrobial resistance.

Since November 2022, SIDP has participated in endorsing seven letters addressing various legislative, antibiotic resistance, and funding-related issues. Details regarding the sponsoring organizations and the focus areas of these letters are summarized in the table below:

Focus Area	Sponsoring Organization	Month Letter Signed
Bio-Preparedness Workforce Pilot Program	IDSA	November 2022
Senate HELP Committee: National program to closely monitor antibiotic use in human and non-human settings	Natural Resources Defense Council	February 2023
Joint Pharmacy Org Post-PHE Priorities	ASHP	February 2023
PASTEUR Act	S-FAR	February 2023
FY24 Public Health and Bio Pilot LRP	IDSA, ASM, HIVMA	March 2023
Bio-Preparedness Workforce Pilot Program	IDSA	May 2023
FDA Breakpoints meeting follow-up	ASM	June 2023

== Publications and Activities ==
Other activities in which SIDP engages include providing clinical guidance, issuing position statements, and offering educational resources. SIDP has endorsed guidance documents concerning the essential skills required for antimicrobial stewardship leaders, the pivotal role of pharmacists in antimicrobial stewardship, management of COVID-19, and the optimal utilization of polymyxins. In addition, SIDP has released position statements advocating for the prudent use of antimicrobials across diverse settings, including agricultural applications and ambulatory care settings. For all publications, visit: https://sidp.org/SIDP-Publications

At the end of 2019, it was announced that SIDP would join as a partner in IDWeek. IDWeek is the collaborative annual conference of the Infectious Diseases Society of America (IDSA), the Society for Healthcare Epidemiology of America (SHEA), the HIV Medicine Association (HIVMA), the Pediatric Infectious Diseases Society (PIDS), and the Society of Infectious Diseases Pharmacists (SIDP). As a partner society, SIDP appoints a representative to the official planning committee for a 3-year term. SIDP's objective as a partner organization of IDWeek is to facilitate the gathering of experts in both research and practice to present and network at the annual conference. Additionally, the annual SIDP business meeting and reception are currently held in conjunction with IDWeek.

== Educational Programming ==
SIDP offers educational activities focusing on infectious diseases pharmacotherapy and antimicrobial stewardship through a variety of formats, including live and enduring webinar programming, home study materials, and live sessions at the annual SIDP business meeting, which is held concurrently with IDWeek. Examples of educational programming offered by SIDP include on-demand modules, live webinars, symposia, podcasts, journal clubs, and an antimicrobial stewardship certificate program. While the primary audience is pharmacists, many educational activities are accredited for other healthcare disciplines as well. Furthermore, SIDP provides funding for education grants to support initiatives aimed at public education or the development of innovative training methods for healthcare professionals. SIDP is an Accreditation Council for Pharmacy Education (ACPE)-accredited Continuing Education (CE) provider and is approved by the Board of Pharmacy Specialties (BPS) for recertification credits for the Board Certified Infectious Diseases Pharmacist (BCIDP) credential. The majority of activities are offered at no cost or are available at a discounted rate for SIDP members.

== Public Outreach ==
As part of SIDP's dedication to educating the public and healthcare professionals about the role of infectious diseases pharmacists and the appropriate use of antimicrobials, an Antimicrobial Stewardship Advocacy Toolkit was created. This toolkit serves as a resource to assist healthcare providers in enhancing antimicrobial usage within their respective healthcare systems. The toolkit is accessible on the SIDP website as a complimentary resource. It comprises various components, including methods to showcase commitment, posters detailing key action items for pharmacists, guidance on implementing and promoting proper antibiotic disposal, suggestions for enhancing public awareness of antimicrobial stewardship initiatives, and educational materials centered on antimicrobial stewardship and the CDC’s One Health Initiative. Additional educational resources developed for the public include an antimicrobial stewardship curriculum tailored for high school students, materials related to the annual U.S. and World Antibiotic Awareness Week, and informational handouts addressing the safety and efficacy of COVID-19 vaccines.

In 2022, the organization initiated the promotion of an Infectious Diseases Pharmacist Advocacy Day through social media platforms on the first Thursday of each month. SIDP also annually observes Infectious Diseases Pharmacists Day on May 22nd to acknowledge the vital contributions made by infectious diseases pharmacists in combating antimicrobial resistance and enhancing patient care. The inaugural Infectious Diseases Pharmacists Day occurred on May 22nd, 2021. Recognizing the significant role played by infectious diseases pharmacists during the initial phase of the COVID-19 pandemic, the theme for the first year was "Essential COVID-19 Healthcare Workers." The dates and themes for all Infectious Diseases Pharmacists Days are listed below.

Year	ID Pharmacists Day Theme
2021	Essential COVID-19 Healthcare Workers
2022	Deprescribing Antibiotics in COVID-19
2023	Reaching Beyond

== Breakpoints- The SIDP Podcast ==
Launched in July 2019, Breakpoints serves as the official podcast of SIDP. It releases episodes on a monthly basis, featuring conversations with thought leaders in infectious diseases who discuss current topics and clinical controversies. The podcast is available for listeners on various platforms, including Apple Podcasts, Stitcher, Spotify, Overcast, and other popular podcast hosting websites.
