= American University of Health Sciences =

For-profit university in Signal Hill, California, US

- Former name: American Institute of Health Sciences
- Type: Private for-profit
- Established: 1994
- Founders: Kim Dang-Johnson and Gregory Johnson
- Religious affiliation: Christian
- Students: 524
- Location: 1600 East Hill Street, Building #1, Signal Hill, California, 90755, United States
- Campus: Suburban
- Website: www.auhs.edu

American University of Health Sciences is Christian-based private for-profit university in Signal Hill, California, United States. It was established in 1994 and offers bachelor's, master's, and doctoral degrees.

== History ==
American University of Health Sciences was founded by Kim Dang-Johnson and her husband, Pastor Gregory Johnson, as the American Institute of Health Sciences in Signal Hill, California in 1994. It was established as a private for-profit Christian-based postsecondary institution for healthcare education, and continues that mission today.

It became the American University of Health Sciences when it was incorporated in 2003.

== Campus ==
American University of Health Sciences is located in a suburban setting at 1600 East Hill Street, Building #1 in Signal Hill, California.

== Academics ==
American University of Health Sciences offers a Bachelor of Science in nursing and pharmaceutical science. It also offers a pre-degree program in research medical assistant and pharmacy technology. The university offers a Master's of Science degree in nursing, a Master's of Science degree in clinical research, and a postbaccalaureate certificate in clinical research associate and clinical research coordinator. The university also offers a doctorate in pharmacy.

American University of Health Sciences was accredited by the Accrediting Council for Independent Colleges and Schools in 2003. It accredited by the Western Association of Schools and Colleges Senior College & University Commission in 2017. It is also accredited by the Transnational Association of Christian Colleges and Schools Accreditation Commission. Its pharmacy program is accredited by the Accreditation Council for Pharmacy Education and the American Association of Colleges of Pharmacy.

U.S. News & World Report ranks the university #624 of 686 nursing schools in the United States for 2026. In 2025, Los Angeles Times rated American University of Health Sciences Pharmacy School #13 in California. In 2014, the United States Department of Education rated American University Health Sciences as the most expensive four-year bachelor-degree college, when compared with 2,000 institutions.

American University of Health Sciences has a chapter of Sigma Theta Tau, an international honor society for nursing.

== Students ==
In 2024, American University of Health Sciences had 364 undergraduate students. Those students were 45 percent Asian, 31 percent Hispanic, eleven percent Black, four percent White, three percent Native Hawaiian/Pacific Islander, one percent two or more races, two percent international, and one percent unknown. The university also has 160 graduate students. It focus is on serving minority students.

== See also ==
- List of for-profit universities and colleges
- List of nursing schools in the United States
- List of pharmacy schools in the United States
