= Kerry LaPlante =

American pharmacist

Kerry L. LaPlante
- Born: Buffalo, New York
- Occupations: Dean, pharmacist, academic and researcher
- Awards: Young Investigator of the Year Award, The Society of Infectious Diseases; Pharmacist of the Year Award, Rhode Island Society of Health-System Pharmacists; Distinguished Young Pharmacist Award, Michigan Pharmacist Association

Academic background
- Education: B.S., Biology; B.S., Pharmaceutical Sciences; Pharm. D.
- Alma mater: Canisius College; Wayne State University

Academic work
- Institutions: University of Rhode Island; Brown University

Kerry L. LaPlante is an American pharmacist, academic leader, and internationally recognized researcher in infectious diseases and antimicrobial resistance. She currently serves as Dean of the University of Rhode Island College of Pharmacy. She is a Professor of Pharmacy and former department Chair of the Department of Pharmacy Practice at the University of Rhode Island, an adjunct professor of medicine at Brown University, an Infectious Diseases Pharmacotherapy Specialist, and the Director of the Rhode Island Infectious Diseases Fellowship and Research Programs at the Veterans Affairs Medical Center in Providence, Rhode Island.

LaPlante has authored more than 150 publications. She has worked on treatment, prevention, outcomes, virulence inhibition, and decolonization of multiple drug resistant bacteria. She has also explored pharmacodynamic dosing indexes of antimicrobial therapy and the role of drug therapy on bacterial virulence factors such as toxin and biofilm formation. Her clinical research primarily focuses on the implementation of antimicrobial stewardship programs across the Veterans Health Administration.

LaPlante is a Fellow of the American College of Clinical Pharmacy (FCCP), the Infectious Diseases Society of America and the Past President of the Society of Infectious Diseases Pharmacists (SIDP).

== Education ==
LaPlante studied at Canisius University and received her Bachelor's degree in biology in 1996. She then enrolled at Wayne State University and completed her Bachelor's degree in pharmaceutical sciences in 2000, her Doctor of Pharmacy degree in 2002, and post-doctoral fellowship in infectious diseases pharmacotherapy at the Anti-infective Research Laboratory in 2004.

== Career ==
Following her Bachelor's studies, LaPlante held a brief appointment as an Instructor at Canisius College before joining Wayne State University in 2002 as a Clinical Instructor and Research Associate. In 2004, she joined University of Rhode Island and served there as Assistant Professor of Pharmacy till 2010. From 2010 to 2015, she was appointed as Associate Professor with Tenure at University of Rhode Island, and as Adjunct Clinical Associate Professor of Medicine at Brown University. She then became Adjunct Professor of Medicine at Brown University, and Professor with Tenure at University of Rhode Island.

LaPlante is a Director of Center for Antimicrobial Resistance and Therapeutic Discovery, the Infectious Diseases Research Program, and Infectious Diseases Pharmacotherapy Specialist at the Providence VA Medical Center. She also served as Co-Director of Veterans Affairs Advanced Fellowship in Health Services Research and Development (HSR&D), and Chair of Department of Pharmacy Practice at University of Rhode Island.

== Research ==
LaPlante's research primarily focuses on the treatment, prevention, outcomes, virulence inhibition, of drug resistant bacteria. She also explores pharmacodynamic dosing indexes of antimicrobial therapy, and role of drug therapy on bacterial virulence factors such as toxin and biofilm formation. In her laboratory, LaPlante particularly studies biofilms in context of clinical infections, and focuses on the prevention and treatment of biofilm-associated infections in Staphylococcus, Enterococcus and Pseudomonas.

=== Staphylococcus ===
In her study regarding Staphylococcus, LaPlante investigated the impact of bacterial inocula and biofilm formation of Staphylococcus aureus in context of antimicrobial activities and patient outcomes. She found out that certain antimicrobial alone and or in combination effect high-inoculum Staphylococcus aureus infections differently.

LaPlante conducted study in 2012 focused the Methicillin‐resistant Staphylococcus aureus (MRSA), its treatment and risk factors. She discussed the importance of identification of potential risk factors for CA‐MRSA acquisition in terms of providing effective therapeutic guidelines. She also quantified the biofilm formation of methicillin (meticillin)-resistant Staphylococcus aureus (MRSA) isolates and evaluated the in vitro activities of daptomycin and vancomycin while monitoring the isolates for the development of resistance.

In her study, LaPlante evaluated several antimicrobial compounds against CA-MRSA, the levels of inocula for clindamycin activity, the strains with inducible macrolide lincosamide-streptogramin type B (iMLSB) resistance, and strains with noninducible resistance. She determined that clindamycin's activity against the iMLSB strains tested was partially impacted by inoculum size, and also suggested several alternatives in context of treating clindamycin resistance-inducible strains of CA-MRSA. She also conducted study regarding MRSA decolonization agents and provided an evidence‐based review about them using the databases of the Cochrane Central Register of Controlled Trials, MEDLINE, and EMBASE. She also investigated the effects of Cranberry Extracts in context of Growth and Biofilm Production of Escherichia coli and Staphylococcus species.

=== Antibiotics ===
LaPlante conducted study regarding the role of daptomycin in the treatment of resistant Gram-positive infections, including skin and skin-structure infections resulted from surgery, diabetic foot ulcers, and burns. In her study, she regarded vancomycin as a standard treatment for MRSA infections. She also studied the antimicrobial properties of structurally unusual bisanthraquinone metabolites, and measured the biological activities against clinically derived isolates of vancomycin-resistant Enterococcus faecium (VRE), and methicillin-susceptible, methicillin-resistant, and tetracycline-resistant Staphylococcus aureus.

In year 2006, LaPlante focused her study on a glycopeptide antibiotic "Oritavancin", its development, usage and efficacy in context of catheter-related bacteraemia and nosocomial pneumonia. She also conducted structure-activity studies regarding the usage of echinomycin antibiotics against drug-resistant and biofilm-forming Staphylococcus aureus and Enterococcus faecalis.

=== Biofilms ===
LaPlante has conducted several studies investigating the role of biofilm in difficult to treat infections. Her work has highlighted that ethanol and isopropyl alcohol exposure increases biofilm formation of S. aureus and S. epidermidis at concentrations used in clinical settings. Of interest, Ethanol and isopropyl alcohol did not eradicate viable "Staphylococci" from formed biofilm.

Furthermore, she focused her study on the investigation of the activity of daptomycin and vancomycin lock solutions against Staphylococcus aureus and Staphylococcus epidermidis in an in vitro central venous catheter (CVC) model.

=== MRSA ===
In her study regarding MRSA, LaPlante drawn a comparative analysis between linezolid and vancomycin and quantified the effectiveness of these antibiotics in context of MRSA-infected adult patients admitted to all Veterans Affairs hospitals between January 2002 and June 2008. Furthermore, she conducted a study to evaluate results regarding preoperative urine screening and postoperative outcomes among a national cohort of surgical patients.

== Awards and honors ==
- 2004 - Distinguished Young Pharmacist Award, Michigan Pharmacist Association
- 2005 - Roland T. Lakey Award For outstanding contribution, Wayne County Pharmacist Association
- 2005 - Presidential Service Award, Wayne County Pharmacist Association
- 2010 - Young Investigator of the Year Award, The Society of Infectious Diseases
- 2014 - Advanced Career Faculty Research Excellence Award in the Life Sciences, The University of Rhode Island
- 2015 - Fellow, American College of Clinical Pharmacy
- 2016 - Edward J. Quinlan Award for Patient Safety Excellence Award, Providence VA Medical Center
- 2016 - Pharmacist of the Year Award, Rhode Island Society of Health-System Pharmacists
- 2017 - Fellow, Infectious Disease Society of America

== Bibliography ==
=== Books ===
- Antibiotic Stewardship: Principles & Practice (2017) ISBN 978-1780644394.

=== Selected articles ===
- Morrill, Haley J.; Pogue, Jason M.; Kaye, Keith S.; LaPlante, Kerry L. (1 April 2015). "Treatment Options for Carbapenem-Resistant Enterobacteriaceae Infections". Open Forum Infectious Diseases. 2 (2) ofv050. doi:10.1093/ofid/ofv050. PMC 4462593. PMID 26125030.
- LaPlante, Kerry L.; Rybak, Michael J. (December 2004). "Impact of High-Inoculum Staphylococcus aureus on the Activities of Nafcillin, Vancomycin, Linezolid, and Daptomycin, Alone and in Combination with Gentamicin, in an In Vitro Pharmacodynamic Model". Antimicrobial Agents and Chemotherapy. 48 (12): 4665–4672. doi:10.1128/AAC.48.12.4665-4672.2004. PMC 529225. PMID 15561842.
- Timbrook, Tristan T.; Morton, Jacob B.; McConeghy, Kevin W.; Caffrey, Aisling R.; Mylonakis, Eleftherios; LaPlante, Kerry L. (1 January 2017). "The Effect of Molecular Rapid Diagnostic Testing on Clinical Outcomes in Bloodstream Infections: A Systematic Review and Meta-analysis". Clinical Infectious Diseases. 64 (1): 15–23. doi:10.1093/cid/ciw649. PMID 27678085.
- Rybak, Michael J.; Pharm.D., Kerry L. LaPlante (January 2005). "Community-Associated Methicillin-Resistant Staphylococcus aureus: A Review". Pharmacotherapy. 25 (1): 74–85. doi:10.1592/phco.25.1.74.55620. PMID 15767223. S2CID 16444427.
- LaPlante, Kerry L.; Woodmansee, Suzanne (September 2009). "Activities of Daptomycin and Vancomycin Alone and in Combination with Rifampin and Gentamicin against Biofilm-Forming Methicillin-Resistant Staphylococcus aureus Isolates in an Experimental Model of Endocarditis". Antimicrobial Agents and Chemotherapy. 53 (9): 3880–3886. doi:10.1128/AAC.00134-09. PMC 2737833. PMID 19564363.
