= Psychiatric pharmacy =

Psychiatric pharmacy, also known as mental health pharmacy, is the area of clinical pharmacy specializing in the treatment of people with psychiatric illnesses through the use of psychotropic medications. It is a branch of neuropsychiatric pharmacy, which includes neurologic pharmacy. Areas where psychiatric pharmacists are found most abundantly are in chemical dependency, developmental disabilities, long-term care facilities, adherence clinics, mental health clinics, and within the prison system. However, psychiatry and neurology are not the only areas where psychiatric pharmacists require comprehensive knowledge. They must also be proficient in clinical problem solving, interprofessionalism, and communication with understanding and empathy for the patient population they serve, as they are a sensitive group.

== History ==
Psychiatric pharmacy was introduced in the late 1960s. The first time a psychiatric pharmacist was able to practice in a psychiatric unit was in 1971, as assigned by the US Public Health Service. This became the setting for the first published case where the role of a psychiatric pharmacist was elaborated upon. Psychiatric pharmacists were working not only in psychiatric inpatient and outpatient settings, but in methadone and disulfiram clinics, along with centers for mentally disabled people. During this time, the University of Tennessee created contracts which allowed for pharmacy dispensing and clinical services for local psychiatric facilities. This treatment paradigm involved some of the collaborative drug therapy management and medication therapy management (MTM) systems in which psychiatric pharmacists employ today.

The College of Psychiatric and Neurologic Pharmacists (CPNP) is a professional organization that represents psychiatric pharmacists within the United States. CPNP credits two key pharmacists with developing clinical psychiatric pharmacy as a specialty: Dr. Glen Stimmel, PharmD, BCPP and Dr. R. Lee Evans, PharmD, FASHP, BCPP. Dr. Stimmel would later become a founding member of CPNP, as well as serve as its president. Dr. Matthew Fuller PharmD, BCPP, FASHP, CPNP Foundation President 2006–2007, has recognized Dr. Stimmel as the "Father of Psychiatric Pharmacy." The specialty of psychiatric pharmacy was recognized by the Board of Pharmacy Specialties (BPS) in 1992.

== Practitioners ==
=== In the United States ===
Psychiatric pharmacy is practiced by psychiatric (also called "neuropsychiatric") pharmacists. Psychiatric pharmacists tend to have a board certification in the specialty of psychiatric pharmacy, granting the title of Board Certified Psychiatric Pharmacist (BCPP) by the Board of Pharmacy Specialties (BPS), and attach the post-nominals after their professional degrees. Because the BPS does not have a separate certification for neurologic pharmacists, neurologic pharmacists may be classified as BCPP's as well (indeed, there is a significant amount of overlap between the two subspecialties). It is not uncommon for psychiatric pharmacists to be residency trained through a specialized residency (post-graduate year 2, abbreviated "PGY2") program in psychiatric pharmacy. The BCPP program validates that the pharmacist being certified has the progressive knowledge and experience to improve outcomes and recovery for patients with mental or neurological disabilities by designing, implementing, monitoring, and modifying treatment plans for patients as needed. It also ensures that the pharmacist being certified will educate patients, health care professionals, and other stakeholders.

Psychiatric pharmacists work in both the inpatient and outpatient settings.

Psychiatric pharmacists working for the Veterans Health Administration can have salaries between $112,268-145,955.

=== In the United Kingdom ===
Psychiatric pharmacy is practiced by specialist mental health pharmacists. Specialist mental health pharmacists tend to work in the inpatient setting, within mental health hospitals. Credentialing is performed through the College of Mental Health Pharmacy (CMHP), which assesses the experience and aptitude of pharmacists working in the field of mental health (psychiatric) pharmacy. Credentialed members are granted the title of Member of the College of Mental Health Pharmacy (MCMHP), and attach the post-nominals after their professional degrees. Notable psychiatric pharmacists include Professor David Taylor, foundation president of the college of mental health pharmacy.

== Scope of practice ==
As experts in pharmacotherapy, psychiatric pharmacists are trained to assure that patients with mental illness are treated with the most appropriate medications for their conditions. They provide a variety of services aimed at making sure that patients are treated safely, that side effects are minimized (if not eliminated), and that pharmacologic treatments are efficacious at controlling or halting disease progression.

=== Comprehensive medication management ===
Psychiatric pharmacists provide a service called comprehensive medication management (CMM), which involves a thorough assessment of a patient's present and past medication history, laboratory work-up and exam findings, and treatment goals. During CMM, psychiatric pharmacists look for drug related problems (DRPs) related to their patients' pharmacotherapy and correct them in collaboration with psychiatrists, social workers, and other members of the interdisciplinary healthcare team, collaborating closely with the patient and their family.

=== Therapeutic drug monitoring ===
Psychiatric pharmacists provide therapeutic drug monitoring, which involves ordering laboratory tests that will measure the concentration of a medication in the blood. This is especially useful in the area of psychiatric pharmacy because a lot of drugs used to treat psychiatric illnesses (for example, lithium citrate and clozapine) have a narrow therapeutic window. There is a lot of potential for severe adverse reactions when using certain psychiatric medications, making therapeutic drug monitoring a useful tool for preventing harmful outcomes. The National Council for Behavioral Health, a collaborative that represents the interests of psychiatric professional organizations, offers recommendations for targeted, interdisciplinary interventions by psychiatric pharmacists, including pharmacist-lead clozapine clinics and providing long-acting injectable antipsychotic administration services.

Psychiatric pharmacists are sometimes involved in collaborative practice agreements which physicians, which allows pharmacists to add or remove medications from a patient's drug regimen, change the strengths/dose or frequencies of medications, the duration of treatment, and the route of administration. Combined with therapeutic drug monitoring, this allows psychiatric pharmacists to directly make changes to a patient's drug regimen based on the results from laboratory tests.
