= Joint Commission of Pharmacy Practitioners =

- Abbreviation: JCPP
- Formation: 1977
- Region served: United States
- Members: 13 organizations (2017)
- Website: jcpp.net

The Joint Commission of Pharmacy Practitioners (JCPP) is the largest professional delegation representing the interests of pharmacists within the United States. JCPP represents 13 professional associations in the field of pharmacy, developing consensus policy directives for the profession. It is well known for the 2014 development of "The Pharmacists’ Patient Care Process," which provides broad, consensus guidelines for how clinical pharmacists should practice.

== History ==
JCPP was founded in 1977 with the purpose of bringing American pharmacists from across the field together to discuss the future of the profession and other matters of strategic importance to the profession of pharmacy as a whole.

== Meetings ==
JCPP holds quarterly meetings of its delegates to discuss topics of relevance to the profession of pharmacy as a whole. Prior to holding quarterly meetings, JCPP held conferences for pharmacy stakeholders that lasted a few days long.

== Publications ==
On May 29, 2014, JCPP's member organizations approved the "Pharmacists’ Patient Care Process" (PCPP) with the goal of providing a unified, professional understanding of pharmacist-lead pharmaceutical care. The PCPP was drafted by representatives from ten JCPP member organizations. The Accreditation Council for Pharmacy Education, a member of JCPP, requires that pharmacy schools within the United States incorporate the PCPP into their curricula. The effort grew out of prior efforts to standardize "pharmacist workup of drug therapy," which the process now provides a guideline for doing. Part of the impetus for the development of the PCPP came from the desire of pharmacists to measure the outcomes of their care. By standardizing pharmaceutical care, outcomes could be attributed to the care itself, rather than any bias introduced by differences in methodology. The PCPP emphasizes the need for pharmacists to work together with other healthcare professionals to improve medication-related outcomes. The PCPP has been covered in Centers for Disease Control and Prevention Public Health Grand Rounds, and has been the subject of continuing education programs for a variety of pharmacy groups.

In 2011, JCPP wrote a report to the Surgeon General of the United States, Office of the Chief Pharmacist, titled, "Improving Patient and Health System Outcomes through Advanced Pharmacy Practice."

== Delegation ==
As of March 2017, JCPP is composed of 13 professional pharmacy associations and their respective representatives:

- Academy of Managed Care Pharmacy (AMCP), represented by Susan Cantrell, CEO of AMCP
- American Association of Colleges of Pharmacy (AACP), represented by Lucinda Maine, CEO of AACP
- American College of Apothecaries (ACA), represented by Donnie Calhoun, Executive Vice President of ACA
- American College of Clinical Pharmacy (ACCP), represented by Michael S. Maddux, Executive Director of ACCP
- Accreditation Council for Pharmacy Education (ACPE), represented by Peter Vlasses, Executive Director of ACPE
- American Pharmacists Association (APhA), represented by Thomas Menighan, Executive Vice President and CEO of APhA
- American Society of Consultant Pharmacists (ASCP), represented by Frank Grosso, Executive Vice President and CEO of ASCP
- American Society of Health-System Pharmacists (ASHP), represented by Paul Abramowitz, CEO of ASHP
- College of Psychiatric and Neurologic Pharmacists (CPNP), represented by Brenda Schimenti, Executive Director of CPNP
- Hematology/Oncology Pharmacy Association (HOPA), represented by Suzanne Simons, Executive Director of HOPA
- National Association of Boards of Pharmacy (NABP), represented by Carmen Catizone, Executive Director of NABP
- National Community Pharmacists Association (NCPA), represented by Douglas Hoey, CEO of NCPA
- National Alliance of State Pharmacy Associations (NASPA), represented by Rebecca Snead, CEO of NASPA

The most recent professional organizations to join JCPP are CPNP and HOPA, added in February 2017.
