= Chandler Park =

American physician

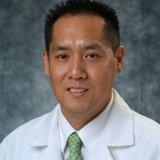
- Education: Biomedical engineering B.S. at (University of Illinois at Urbana-Champaign); Medical Doctorate M.D. at (University of Louisville School of Medicine) biophysics MSc (University of Louisville Graduate School); Transitional surgery internship at Cleveland Clinic Foundation Health Systems diagnostic radiology and internal medicine residency at Indiana University School of Medicine
- Occupations: Physician, clinical researcher, medical writer

Chandler Park is an American physician, medical journalist, and clinical researcher. In June 2021, his cancer research was published in prominent medical journals including the New England Journal of Medicine and Journal of Clinical Oncology. Park also contributes regularly as an expert physician for popular newspapers and magazines such as Newsweek, Reader's Digest, U.S. News & World Report, The Exponent-Telegram, College of St. Scholastica, and Medscape and writes medical news for Doximity. He hosts a national podcast that provides cancer updates on Onclive.com for oncologists called Oncology Unplugged.

== Career ==
Park is a clinical professor that teaches biochemistry, physiology, hematology, and medical oncology at the University of Louisville School of Medicine. He also works as an advisory Dean at the University of Louisville School of Medicine and plays a vital role in the transition into medical school and the development into a physician. Park was selected as a teaching faculty to provide new cancer information at American Society of Clinical Oncology. In February 2019, he helped develop the continuing medical education course titled 2019 Breast and Gynecologic Cancers for American Society of Clinical Oncology and published his continuing medical education course in Anticancer Therapeutics, Research, and Supportive Care. In February 2020, he also helped develop a new continuing medical education online course for cancer physicians in America to update them on new cancer information in Hematologic Malignancies and Blood Cancers. In June 2020, he was interviewed to discuss CAR-T Cell and provided information on upcoming treatments for CAR-T cell.

Park is also one of the contributing authors of the book, Lung Cancer: Standards of Care that discusses diagnosis and treatment of lung cancers released in December 2020. Park was also interviewed by Targeted Oncology on Kidney Cancer Treatments in February 2021.

In 2020, Park was selected as the President of the Kentucky Society of Clinical Oncology. The Kentucky Society of Clinical Oncology is the state affiliate of American Society of Clinical Oncology, American Society of Hematology, and National Cancer Institute.

He has been interviewed by leading cancer media digital media including Cure Magazine, Targeted Oncology, Urology Times, and OncLive in 2023.

== Journalism ==
Park writes medical columns for Medscape and Doximity Op(m)ed. He writes articles on medical education and cancer news. His medical education writings include The Hidden Curriculum: How to Avoid Being Labeled a Problem Resident. He has also written cancer news at the American Society of Clinical Oncology and American Society of Hematology annual meetings, and has volunteered on the editorial board of Journal of Hospital Practice and helps select cancer journal articles for hospital physicians. Park is the founder of Cancervisit a company dedicated to helping cancer patients and their families. In April 2020, Park was interviewed by the American College of Physicians on ways medical students can prepare for residency training.

Park also provides video medical updates for physicians on IMDb and YouTube. He has written cancer updates in kidney cancer with Toni Choueiri, prostate cancer with Neeraj Agarwal, and Bladder Cancer with Petros Grivas

== Education ==
Park received a Bachelor of Science degree in Biomedical Engineering and Biochemistry from University of Illinois at Urbana-Champaign and his Doctor of Medicine degree from the University of Louisville School of Medicine. He also acquired medical science research training at the University of Louisville in Louisville, Kentucky and received a master's degree in science in biophysics.

After his medical school and graduate school research training, Park served his surgery transitional internship at Cleveland Clinic Foundation Health Systems. Next, he did his residency training in diagnostic radiology and internal medicine at IU Medical Center. Afterwards he finished subspecialist medical training in Hematology and Oncology at WVU Cancer Institute and received additional medical training as a visiting fellow at University of Pittsburgh in cancer immunotherapy.

He is a practicing cancer physician at Norton Cancer Institute and a physician member of the molecular tumor board at the University of Kentucky Markey Cancer Center. Park is triple-board-certified in internal medicine, hematology and oncology.

== Research ==
Park has participated in multiple cancer clinical trials in lung, melanoma, thyroid, and bone marrow transplant. He has been nationally recognized as an exceptional doctor by his physician colleagues and was given an honorary title as a distinguished fellow of the American College of Physicians (FACP) for providing outstanding patient care and significant medical research contributions.

Park has written cancer papers about PET/CT and regional brain metabolic changes associated with depression in metastatic breast cancer, sorafenib and thyroid cancer, pemetrexed-based chemotherapy in lung cancer, atypical neurolymphomatosis, metformin use and allogenic stem cell transplant, and decreased cancer rates.

Park's medical research also included an MRI study that used viscoelastic pads to improve patient care during MRI studies. His research group developed the patented viscoelastic pads used by many of the current MRI tables. The viscoelastic pads decrease ischemia, pain, and discomfort for patients undergoing MRI studies. His MRI research led to improved quality of the MRI imaging studies to improve patient care, He has also studied the effect of nicotine on bone arteriole blood flow.

He also volunteers on the editorial board of Journal of Hospital Practice and helps select cancer journal articles for hospital physicians.

== Public speaking ==
After his landmark MRI study was published, Park has been a live public speaker at large medical society meetings including American Society for Therapeutic Radiology and Oncology, and Radiological Society of North America. He was invited as a speaker to discuss "Designing Continuing Professional Development that improves patients care: Insights from a Practicing Oncologist" at the annual Alliance for Continuing Education meeting in Orlando, Florida. In July 2018, he was interviewed by healthcare industry leading magazine Managed Health Care Executive on Five Ways Health Execs Can improve Lymphoma Treatment.

In January 2020, he gave a live oral presentation to the Alliance of Continuing Medical Education for Healthcare Providers to improve cancer care by medical oncologists by discussing the importance of shared decision making with physicians, patients, nurses, patients' families, pharmacists, and the entire clinical care team. He also co-hosted a medical education program for the Society for Immunotherapy of Cancer that discussed Advances in Cancer Immunotherapy on December 10, 2020.

Park has been chosen as a Castle Connolly Top Doctor in Cancer by his physician peers in 2019, 2020, and 2021. In 2021, Park was recognized as one of the 3 best oncologists in Louisville, Kentucky by Three Best Rated.

Park has also been recognized by the American Registry company with patient care awards in Patient's choice and Compassionate Doctor. In June 2020, he received the 5 year Patient's Choice award as one of Kentucky's Favorite Physicians and top 1% of America's Most Honored Doctors.

== Authored works ==
- Fleming, J. T.; Lobo, S. A.; Park, C. H.; Gordon, S. A.; Roberts, C. S.; Rowell, P. P. (2008). "Nicotine does not reduce blood flow to healthy bone in rats". American Journal of Orthopedics (Belle Mead, N.J.). 37 (7): E129–32. PMID 18795191.
- Park, Chandler; Perini, Jessica; Farmer, Roger W.; Fancy, Tanya; Monga, Manish; Remick, Scot C (2014). "Sorafenib and Thyroid Cancer". Expert Review of Endocrinology & Metabolism. 9 (6): 561–570. doi:10.1586/17446651.2014.960391. PMID 30736194. S2CID 56683794.
- C. Park, M. Almubarak, K. Patel, J. Flannery, M. Haut, G. Hobbs, G. Marano. "PET/CT and Regional Brain Metabolic Changes Associated with Depression in Metastatic Breast Cancer." Presentation at American Society of Clinical Oncology June 2016
- Alshehri, A.; Alsubait, S.; Alamgir, M.; Park, C.; Wen, S.; Luo, J.; Ma, P.; Monga, M. (2015). "Pemetrexed-based chemotherapy in advanced nonsquamous non-small cell lung cancer (NSCLC)". Journal of Clinical Oncology. 33 (15_suppl) e22245. doi:10.1200/jco.2015.33.15_suppl.e22245.
- Khimani, F.; Park, C.; Monga, M.; Hobbs, G.; Leadmon, S.; Basu, S. (2014). "Metformin use and allogeneic stem cell transplant (ASCT) outcomes". Journal of Clinical Oncology. 32 (15_suppl) 18001. doi:10.1200/jco.2014.32.15_suppl.e18001.
- Murray, A.; Bittner, F.; Gyure, K.; Park, C.; Addocks, A. (2015). "An Atypical Presentation of Neurolymphomatosis: A case report and literature review". Neurology. 84 (14S) P2.012. doi:10.1212/WNL.84.14_supplement.P2.012.
- C. Park, J. Caverney, T. Hogan. "Sunitinib As the 'Second Hit' In Acute Esophageal Necrosis." American College of Physicians. American College of Physicians: Research Presentation October 2014.
- C. Park, A. Almustafa, S. Basu. "Recurrent Decompensated Heart Failure Due to Multiple Myeloma Associated Amyloidosis." American College of Physicians. Research Presentation. October 2014.
- C. Park, N. Moka, M. Monga. "Acquired Hemophilia in a Patient with Hepatocellular Carcinoma." American College of Physicians. Research Presentation. October 2014.
- C. Park, A. Husain "PET scan negative metastatic chondrosarcoma," American College of Physicians. Research Presentation. October 2011 ACP Annual Meeting.
- C. Park, J. Massey, I. Koury, P. Rothschild. "Use of pressure relieving viscoelastic MRI pads to reduce patient motion and callbacks." Oral Research Presentation 2006 Radiological Society of North America, November 2006.
