= CMM =

CMM may refer to

== Science and technology ==
- Capability Maturity Model, a tool for assessing processes in organizations during software development
- Clavibacter michiganensis subsp. michiganensis, plant pathogen subspecies
- Cluster management module, part of a Motorola Canopy system
- Color management module, a term in color management
- Conditional Markov model or maximum-entropy Markov model
- Coordinate-measuring machine, a device for dimensional measuring
- Coordinated management of meaning, a communications theory
- Cybersecurity maturity model, a type of maturity model
- C--, also pronounced Cmm, a programming language

== Finance ==
- Constant Maturity Mortgage, a benchmark yield for mortgage-backed securities

== Mathematics ==
- The wallpaper group cmm (2*22)

== Organisations ==
- Canadian Methodist Mission
- Center for Mathematical Modeling, a research institute in Chile
- Centre de Morphologie Mathématique (Center of Mathematical Morphology), a research center of the École des Mines de Paris in France
- Chhattisgarh Mukti Morcha, a political party in India
- Congregation of the Missionaries of Mariannhill

== Other uses ==
- Commander of the Order of Military Merit, a Canadian decoration
- Communauté métropolitaine de Montréal (CMM), French name of the Montreal Metropolitan Community (MMC), part of Greater Montreal
- Corpus mensurabilis musicae, a collection of polyphonic vocal music of the Renaissance
- Castilla-La Mancha Media (CMM), a regional public broadcaster in Spain
- Comprehensive medication management, process of delivering a patient's medications for appropriate use
