= Angela Kashuba =

American pharmacologist

Angela D. Kashuba, PharmD
- Education: University of Toronto, University at Buffalo
- Known for: Antiretroviral Pharmacology
- Website: https://pharmacy.unc.edu/angela-kashuba-lab/

Angela Kashuba is the John A. and Deborah S. McNeill Jr. Distinguished Professor of Pharmacy and Director of the UNC CFAR Clinical Pharmacology and Analytical Chemistry Core. She is the former Dean and Chair of the Division of Pharmacotherapy and Experimental of the University of North Carolina at Chapel Hill Eshelman School of Pharmacy.

== Education and career ==
Kashuba received her Bachelors of Pharmacy from University of Toronto and her Doctorate of Pharmacy from University at Buffalo School of Pharmacy and Pharmaceutical Sciences. She next completed residency at Women's College Hospital in Toronto. After her residency, she studied clinical pharmacology at Bassett Healthcare, which is part of Columbia University Medical Center.

The focus of Kashuba's research career has been pharmacology of antiretrovirals for the treatment and prevention of HIV.

== Recognition ==
In 2009, Kashuba received the Leon I. Goldberg Young Investigator Award from the American Society for Pharmacology and Experimental Therapeutics.

== Personal life ==
She has two children and notes the individuality of work–life balance.
