= Collaborative practice agreement =

Legal relationship between clinical pharmacists and collaborating physicians

CPAs are legal CPAs are illegal

A collaborative practice agreement (CPA) is a legal document in the United States that establishes a legal relationship between clinical pharmacists and collaborating physicians that allows for pharmacists to participate in collaborative drug therapy management (CDTM).

CDTM is an expansion of the traditional pharmacist scope of practice, allowing for pharmacist-led management of drug related problems (DRPs) with an emphasis on a collaborative, interdisciplinary approach to pharmacy practice in the healthcare setting. The terms of a CPA are decided by the collaborating pharmacist and physician, though templates exist online. CPAs can be specific to a patient population of interest to the two parties, a specific clinical situation or disease state, and/or may outline an evidence-based protocol for managing the drug regimen of patients under the CPA. CPAs have become the subject of intense debate within the pharmacy and medical professions.

A CPA can be referred to as a consult agreement, physician-pharmacist agreement, standing order or protocol, or physician delegation.

== History ==
According to healthcare researcher Karen E. Koch, the first coining of the term "collaborative drug therapy management" can be traced back to William A. Zellmer's 1995 publication in the American Journal of Health-System Pharmacy. Zellmer advocates use of the term "collaborative drug therapy management" instead of "prescribing," arguing that it will make legislation that expands the authority of pharmacists more palatable to lawmakers (and physician stakeholders). Most importantly, it centers the discussion on why pharmacists are interested in expanding that authority: to improve patient care through interdisciplinary collaboration. The modern concept of collaborative practice was derived, in part, to avoid the controversial term of dependent prescribing authority.

The term "collaborative practice agreement" has also been referred to as a consult agreement, collaborative pharmacy practice agreement, physician-pharmacist agreement, standing order or standing protocol, and physician delegation. A collaborative practice agreement is a legal document in the United States that establishes a formal relationship between pharmacists (often clinical pharmacy specialists) and collaborating physicians for the purpose of establishing a legal and ethical basis for pharmacists to participate in collaborative drug therapy management.

Legal guidance and requirements for the formation of CPAs are established on a state by state basis. The federal government approved CPAs in 1995. Washington was the first state to pass legislation allowing for the formal formation of CPAs. In 1979, Washington amended the Practice of Pharmacy Requirements providing for the formation of "collaborative drug therapy agreements." As of February 2016, 48 states and Washington D.C. have approved laws that allow for the provision of CPAs. The only two states that do not allow for the provision of CPAs are Alabama [please note this has recently changed in Alabama. See: https://albop.com/oodoardu/2022/02/CPA-Full-Application.pdf) and Delaware. Alabama pharmacists had hoped to see a CPA law, House Bill 494, pass in 2015. The bill was introduced by Alabama House Representative Ron Johnson but died in committee.

As of 2010, Medicare Part B does not provide reimbursement for pharmacists. The Pharmacy and Medically Underserved Areas Enhancement Act (H.R. 592 / S. 109) was introduced in both the House and the Senate in January 2017. This would allow pharmacists to be reimbursed through Medicare Part B for providing healthcare services in federally defined medically underserved communities. These must be services that pharmacists are licensed to perform in their particular state, and services in which physicians would have been reimbursed for under Medicare.

Below is a list of US states that have approved CPAs and the year that they were approved (and/or later updated), as of February 2016:

State	Year
Alabama	Not approved
Alaska	2002
Arizona	2000
Arkansas	1997
California	1981, 2002
Colorado	2007, 2016
Connecticut	2002
Delaware	Not approved
Florida	1986, 1997
Georgia	2000
Hawaii	1997, 2002
Idaho	1998
Illinois	Unregulated
Indiana	1996, 2011
Iowa	1996
Kansas	1996, 2014
Kentucky	1996
Louisiana	1999
Maine	2013
Maryland	2002
Massachusetts	2009
Michigan	1991
Minnesota	1998
Mississippi	1987
Missouri	2012
Montana	2001
Nebraska	1998
Nevada	1990
New Hampshire	2006
New Jersey	2004
New Mexico	1993, 2002
New York	2011
North Carolina	1999
North Dakota	1995, 2001
Ohio	1999
Oklahoma	Unregulated
Oregon	1980
Pennsylvania	2002
Rhode Island	2001
South Carolina	1998
South Dakota	1993
Tennessee	2014
Texas	1995
Utah	2001
Vermont	1992
Virginia	1999, 2013
Washington	1979
West Virginia	2008
Wisconsin	2000
Wyoming	1999

== Effect on outcomes ==
CPAs have been implemented for the management of a plethora of chronic disease states, including diabetes mellitus, asthma, and hypertension. Evidence suggests that CPAs have resulted in beneficial health outcomes for patients involved. It has been shown that pharmacists working with providers under CPAs help deliver higher quality of care in the oncology setting, including the management of antiemetic (anti-vomiting) therapy. Within these settings, CPAs have resulted in improved attainment of goal laboratory values like hemoglobin A1c for diabetics, improved lung function for asthmatics, and improved blood pressure control for people with hypertension.

CPAs can be used as tools for pharmacists to better integrate with practicing clinicians in accountable care organization (ACO) offices, alleviate the time constraints of primary care visits, and help minimize delays in managing patients' chronic conditions.

== Pharmacy services ==
Pharmacists involved in CPAs may participate in clinical services that are outside of the traditional scope of practice for pharmacists. Notably, pharmacists do not need to participate in CPAs to provide many pharmacy practice services that are already covered by their traditional scope of practice, such as performing medication therapy management, providing disease prevention services (e.g. immunizations), engaging in public health screenings (e.g. screening patients for depressive disorders, such as major depressive disorder, via administering the PHQ-2), providing disease-state specific education (e.g. as a certified diabetes educator), and counseling patients on information regarding their medications.

Expanded pharmacy services under a CPA are described as collaborative drug therapy management (CDTM). (Note: CDTM is sometimes also referred to as clinical pharmacy services, pharmaceutical care, disease state management, or comprehensive medication management.) While the traditional scope of practice for pharmacists provides for the legal authority to detect drug related problems (DRPs) and provide suggestions for solving DRPs to prescribers (such as physicians), pharmacists that provide CDTM directly solve DRPs when they detect them. This may involve prescribing activities, which include selecting and initiating medications for the treatment of a patient's diagnosed illnesses (as outlined in the CPA), discontinuing the use of prescription or over-the-counter medications, modifying a patient's drug therapy (e.g. changing the strength, frequency, route of drug administration, or duration of therapy), evaluating a patient's response to drug therapy (which may include ordering and performing laboratory tests, such as a basic metabolic panel), and continuing drug therapy (providing a new prescription).

Other services may include administering medications, especially those administered parenterally (e.g. long-acting, injectable antipsychotics).

== Variation by state ==
The legal provisions of CPAs vary on a state-by-state basis. This affects the specific services that pharmacists are allowed to perform pursuant to a CPA, as well as the terms of the arrangement (e.g. requirements for CPA renewal). Wisconsin's "Wisconsin Act 294," for example, has been described by the American Pharmacists Association (APhA) as granting some of the most expansive powers to pharmacists in any state CPA law.

State	Notes
Alabama	Not approved.
Alaska	Regulations for CPAs in Alaska are found in the Alaska Administrative Code, title 12, chapter 52, section 240 (12 AAC 52.240). Pharmacists must submit a CPA application to the Alaska Board of Pharmacy for approval. Collaborating physicians must get approved from the Alaskan Medical Board (pursuant to 12 AAC 40.983). A notable difference from other state CPA laws is that Alaskan pharmacists may enter into CPAs with all practitioners that prescribe medications (pursuant to Alaska Statute title 8). Alaskan CPAs may involve multiple pharmacists and multiple practitioners (e.g. one pharmacist entering into a CPA with a group of staff physicians, multiple pharmacists entering into a CPA with one physician, or multiple pharmacists entering into a CPA with multiple pharmacists), though a "principal prescribing practitioner" must be named. The CPA must specify the disease states, medications (or medication classes) that the pharmacists are allowed to make decisions on, as well as a procedure/protocol in place for making those decisions. Decisions must be reviewed at least every 3 months together with the covered entities, and the protocols are only effective for a maximum of 2 years at a time. Alaskan CPAs allow pharmacists to "monitor drug therapy" pursuant to 12 AAC 52.995, which includes conducting a full patient history, measuring vital signs, and ordering/evaluating CPA covered laboratory tests.
Arizona	Regulations for CPAs in Arizona are found in the Arizona Revised Statutes and Administration Code, title 13, chapter 18, article 3, section 1970 (ARS 32–1970). In Arizona, CPAs are referred to as "drug therapy management protocols". Arizonan CPAs apply to individual pharmacists and practitioners, referred to as "providers" in the law. Providers include physicians or registered nurse practitioners. The CPA must specify the disease states, medications, conditions for notifying the provider, and the laboratory tests that the pharmacist can order. Pharmacists may monitor or modify a patient's drug treatment in accordance with the CPA, provided that the provider and pharmacist have a mutual patient-practitioner relationship with the patient.
Arkansas	Regulations for CPAs in Arkansas are found in the Laws and Regulations of the Arkansas State Board of Pharmacy, under regulation 9, titled "Pharmaceutical Care/Patient Counseling." In Arkansas, CPAs are referred to as "disease state management" protocols. Arkansan CPAs apply to individual pharmacists, practitioners, specified as "practitioners authorized to prescribe drugs," and patients. The specific disease states that the pharmacists will manage, along with the specified drugs the pharmacist may use, are required. Pharmacists are required to document their interventions for discussion with the collaborative practitioner, and must retain such records for at least 2 years after the date the record is made. To engage in CPAs, pharmacists must be able to assess the health status of their patients, implement a pharmaceutical care plan, communicate with stakeholders, and monitor the patient's progress. This includes being able to determine when to intervene in a patient's drug therapy. Pharmacists may receive credentials from organizations that the Board of Pharmacy approves.
California	Regulations for CPAs in California can be found on the California State Board of Pharmacy website under the California Business and Professions Code, Title 16 Section 4210 and 1730. On October 1, 2013, CA Governor Jerry Brown signed Senate Bill 493 that elevates a pharmacist's role to healthcare provider status, granting them authority to provide hormonal contraceptives, nicotine replacement, vaccinations including travel vaccinations which do not require a diagnosis but are recommended by the CDC, medication recommendations, and to order and interpret lab tests to optimize drug therapies. The bill also included the classification "Advanced Practice Pharmacist" (APh) which is defined by the California State Board of Pharmacy as a licensed pharmacist who must satisfy two of the following criteria: 1. Certification in a specialized form of pharmacy practice from an approved/accredited organization 2. Complete a postgraduate residency through an accredited institution where at least half of direct patient care experiences were interdisciplinary 3. Practiced clinical services for at least 1 year under a CPA, which must be included as documentation; Once licensed by the Board of Pharmacy, APh's can perform patient assessments, refer patients to providers, and work with other healthcare providers to help manage patients' disease states by optimizing drug therapies. This includes initiating, adjusting, and discontinuing medications per protocol established by the specific organization they are working at. APh certification is good for 2 years, as long as the pharmacist's license is active, and the pharmacist must complete at least 10 additional hours of continuing education every 2 years.
Colorado	Regulations for CPAs in Colorado are defined by the Colorado State Board of Pharmacy in Rule 17, established in the Code of Colorado Regulations (3 CCR 719–1). CPAs in Colorado may exist between multiple pharmacists and multiple prescribers (physician or advanced practice nurse), as well as any number of shared patients. Pharmacists may perform physical assessment, order and interpret laboratory tests, and modifying drug therapy (elaborated in Rule 6, "Pharmaceutical Care, Drug Therapy Management and Practice By Protocol"). CPA records must be kept for a minimum of 3 years, though drug therapy management actions must be kept for a minimum of 7 years.
Connecticut	Regulations for CPAs in Connecticut are defined by the Connecticut General Statutes and Regulations, Title 20, Sections 20-631-1 through 20-631-3. A PharmD degree is sufficient qualifications for engaging in CPAs in Connecticut, though other criteria are also available for Bachelor of Science in Pharmacy pharmacists with less than 10 years of clinical experience. The disease states, medications, or classes of medications must be specified in the protocol, though the law places no limitation on the specifics. Pharmacists may administer medications and order laboratory tests per CPA protocol.
Delaware	Not approved
Florida	CPAs in Florida are termed "Prescriber Care Plans," and are defined in the Florida Administrative Code in Rule 64B16-27.830. Under Florida law, pharmacists involved in CPAs may engage in drug therapy management, which are actions that are defined per the CPA protocol. Drug therapy management may include initiating, changing, or discontinuing medications and ordering and interpreting laboratory tests. A continuous quality improvement program is mandatory for Florida CPAs.
Georgia	The Official Code of Georgia (OCGA), Title 26, Chapter 4, Article 3, Section 50 (OCGA § 26-4-50) mandates that pharmacists be certified by the Georgia Board of Pharmacy before modifying drug therapy. Drug therapy management is described in OCGA § 43-34-24. CPAs in Georgia are only between pharmacists and physicians. Specific patients must be defined in the protocol, as well as the specific disease states and medication classes that may be managed. Dose ranges for each medication must be specified. CPA reports must be made at an agreed upon frequency, and must include documentation of drug related problems, recommendations, and drug therapy modifications. CPAs must be renewed every two years.
Hawaii	Hawaiian CPAs are called policies, procedures, or protocols and are described in the Hawaii Revised Statutes, Title 25, Chapter 461 (HI Rev Stat § 461–1). A pharmacist may enter into a CPA with a physician or an advanced practice nurse (provided that the nurse is allowed to prescribe medications). Within a CPA, the pharmacist may order or perform drug therapy, order laboratory tests related to the management of the drug therapy, initiate emergency contraception, dispense an opioid antagonist, and administer drugs by mouth, topically, by nose, or by injection.
Idaho	CPAs in Idaho are called "collaborative pharmacy practice" and are defined in the Rules of the Idaho State Board of Pharmacy, Rule 310. CPAs in Idaho are between pharmacists and prescribers. Specific drugs, classes of drugs, formularies, or clinical practice guidelines may be specified to constrain the pharmacist's drug therapy management activities. A method for monitoring compliance must be agreed upon. The CPA must be renewed annually.
Illinois	CPAs are not regulated in Illinois. Therefore, pharmacists may engage in collaborative drug therapy management if they are acting as agents of the prescribing practitioner.
Indiana	
Iowa	
Kansas	In Kansas, collaborative practice agreements between one or more pharmacists and one or more physicians were established under KAR 68-7-22, which became effective May 27, 2016. The partnership includes collaborative drug therapy management. KAR 68-7-22 outlines the roles of pharmacists and physicians engaged in CPAs, transitions-of-care processes, and logistical terms of the agreements.
Kentucky	
Louisiana	
Maine	
Maryland	
Massachusetts	
Michigan	CPAs are unregulated in Michigan, which means that actions typically permitted by CPAs are permissible. Physicians may delegate medical services to pharmacists without the permission of an explicit CPA. Michigan's Medical Practice Act has been interpreted to allow for pharmacists to modify drug therapy, permitted they write the name of the delegating physician on the prescription, and that the drug in question isn't a Schedule II controlled substance or anabolic steroid.
Minnesota	CPAs in Minnesota are defined under the Minnesota Statute, Chapter 151, Section 151.01, Subdivision 27. CPAs are referred to as collaborative practice agreements or protocols. Pursuant to a CPA, pharmacists in Minnesota may perform CLIA (Clinical Laboratory Improvement Amendments of 1988)-waived laboratory tests, interpret laboratory tests, and modify medication therapy. CPAs in Minnesota may be between multiple pharmacists and multiple practitioners (defined under Subdivision 23 as physicians, dentists, optometrists, podiatrists, veterinarians, and advanced practice nurses).
Mississippi	CPAs in Mississippi are called "collaborative pharmacy practice agreements" and are regulated by the Mississippi Board of Pharmacy in Title 30, Part 3001. In Mississippi, CPAs may be between multiple pharmacists and multiple practitioners (physicians, dentists, veterinarians, or other diagnostician healthcare providers with drug prescribing privileges). Article XXXVI (36) outlines the regulations for CPAs in Mississippi in detail. CPAs must be signed for each individual patient for which they apply. Pharmacists must complete a 16-hour continuing education (CE) course (or accumulate 16 hours of CE on the subject of pharmaceutical care) before participating in pharmaceutical care pursuant to a CPA. Each disease state covered by the CPA mandates biannual CEs of at least 6 hours for the pharmacists involved. The CPA must be renewed on a yearly basis.
Missouri	
Montana	
Nebraska	
Nevada	
New Hampshire	
New Jersey	
New Mexico	New Mexico is one of the four states in the US that permit pharmacists CDTM authority and prescriptive authority under CPA. In 1993, New Mexico passed the Pharmacist Prescriptive Authority Act (PPAC), recognizing advanced practice pharmacist which is officially designated as "Pharmacist Clinician", or Ph.C. Regulation of Pharmacist Clinician is found in New Mexico State Board of Pharmacy section 16.19.4.17 titled Pharmacist Clinician. Certified pharmacist must meet the following requirements to become a Pharmacist Clinician: Completion of 60 hours of board approved physical assessment course work; 150-hour, 300-patient-contact preceptorship supervised by a physician or other practitioner with prescriptive authority.; The certification is renewed biennially with completion of twenty hours of Accreditation Council for Pharmacy Education (ACPE) or category I of the American Medical Association (AMA) approved continuing education. Under the PPAC, certified Pharmacist Clinician is permitted to register for a personal Drug Enforcement Administration (DEA) number. Their scope of practice is mainly drug therapy related general medicine. Currently they have prescriptive authority for these three types of disease states: hypercholesterolemia, diabetes, and hypertension within the specific disease management protocols.
New York	
North Carolina	In 1999, North Carolina enacted the North Carolina Medical Practice Act and created an advanced designation called the clinical pharmacist practitioner (CPP) to allow pharmacists to practice under collaborative practice agreements with supervising physicians. The regulations of the CPP designation can be found in Section .3100 in the Pharmacy Rules of the North Carolina Board of Pharmacy. A pharmacist must meet any of the follow criteria to be eligible to be a CPP: 1. Hold a Board of Pharmacy Specialties (BPS) certification 2. Finish an ASHP accredited residency and obtain at least 2 years of board-approved clinical experience 3. Obtain a PharmD degree and acquire 3 years of board-approved clinical experiences along with a certificate program 4. Obtain a B.S. degree with 5 years of board-approved clinical experience along with 2 certificate programs; Under the collaborative practice agreement, a CPP has prescriptive powers for controlled and noncontrolled substances. Pharmacists can help physicians manage ambulatory patients' chronic diseases through a variety of ways: Modify, start, or stop medications; Administer medications; Monitor medication therapies; Integrate non-pharmaceutical approaches with pharmaceutical care; Order or change laboratory tests; Conduct physical assessments; Provide emergency first care; Conduct outcomes research; Refer patients to other health professionals; The registration for the CPP designation must be renewed annually and require 35 hours of continuing education requirements.
North Dakota	CPAs in North Dakota, defined as "collaborative agreements," are regulated under Chapter 61-04-08 of the North Dakota Administrative Code, titled, "Limited Prescriptive Practices." CPAs may be between multiple pharmacists and physicians in North Dakota. CPAs may only be used in institutional settings (hospitals, skilled nursing facilities, physician clinics, swing-bed facilities, and long-term care facilities). CPAs must be renewed after 2 years, or they expire. The drug classes and/or drugs that may be modified must be spelled out in the CPA, though Schedule II controlled substances may never be authorized. Only specific diagnoses may apply, and must be defined by both parties. All actions pursuant to the CPA that the pharmacist makes must be reported to the CPA's physician(s) within 24 hours (or 72 hours maximum, if the CPA allows).
Ohio	
Oklahoma	Restricted.
Oregon	In 2015, HB 2028 expanded the CPA laws in Oregon, which previously could only involve one provider and one pharmacist. Under HB 2028, statewide CPAs are permitted.
Pennsylvania	
Rhode Island	
South Carolina	
South Dakota	
Tennessee	
Texas	
Utah	
Vermont	
Virginia	
Washington	
West Virginia	
Wisconsin	
Wyoming	

== Pharmacist advocacy ==
CPAs are a focus of advocacy efforts for professional pharmacy organizations. In January 2012, the American Pharmacists Association (APhA) convened a consortium composed of pharmacy, medicine, and nursing stakeholders representing 12 states to discuss the integration of CPAs into everyday clinical practice. The consortium published a white paper titled "Consortium Recommendations for Advancing Pharmacists' Patient Care Services and Collaborative Practice Agreements," summarizing their recommendations.

In July 2015, the National Alliance of State Pharmacy Associations (NASPA) convened a working group composed of appointees from the CEOs of Joint Commission of Pharmacy Practitioners (JCPP) member organizations, the National Association of Chain Drug Stores, and individual states. The 18 member working group's report made recommendations towards what state lawmakers should include in CPA laws.

In 2015, the American College of Clinical Pharmacy (ACCP) published an updated white paper on the subject of collaborative drug therapy management. The ACCP periodically publishes updates on the subject, with previous publications in 2003 and 1997. The paper describes the recent history of CPAs, the legislative progress, and discusses payment models for collaborative drug therapy management activities.

== Physician perspective ==
CPAs have been met with mixed reviews by physicians and physician advocacy groups.

=== Praise ===
In a 2011 commentary for the American College of Clinical Pharmacy (ACCP), healthcare policy consultant and physician Terry McInnis stressed the need for pharmacist–physician collaboration to improve positive patient outcomes and to decrease healthcare costs. In the final paragraph, she makes an appeal towards pharmacists interested in pursuing CPAs:

For pharmacists, I believe that you have come to one of the rare crossroads that will define the future of your profession. You will either take your place as providers of care, or your numbers will dwindle as most dispensing activities are replaced by robotics and pharmacy technicians. I am a physician, and I say our profession and the patients that we serve need you 'on the team' as clinical pharmacist practitioners. But, will you truly join us?

In the keynote address of the 2013 APhA annual meeting, Reid Blackwelder, President of the American Academy of Family Physicians (AAFP), advocated for a "collaborative view of health care."

=== Criticism ===
In 2012, the AAFP produced a position paper that expressed support for CPAs, but stressed the risk of fragmenting care if pharmacists were given fully autonomous prescribing privileges.

In 2010, the American Medical Association (AMA) published a series of reports called the "AMA Scope of Practice Data Series." One of the reports was focused on the profession of pharmacy, which criticized the formation of CPAs as an attempt to encroach upon the physician's scope of practice by pharmacists. In response to the report, a collaboration of seven national professional pharmacy associations drafted a response to the AMA's report on pharmacists. The response urged the AMA to correct their report, and to publish the revised report with errata. In 2011, the House of Delegates of the AMA adopted a softer tone by APhA in response to input from it and other professional pharmacy associations, ultimately passing the following resolution that refocused attention on opposing independent (rather than collaborative, or dependent) practice agreements:

That our AMA develop model state legislation to address the expansion of pharmacist scope of practice that is found to be inappropriate or constitutes the practice of medicine, including but not limited to the issue of interpretations or usage of independent practice arrangements without appropriate physician supervision and work with interested states and specialties to advance such legislation (Directive to Take Action).
