= American Association of Psychiatric Pharmacists =

- Abbreviation: AAPP
- Predecessor: College of Psychiatric and Neurologic Pharmacists; Conference of Psychiatric and Neurologic Pharmacists
- Formation: March 24, 1998
- Type: Professional Association
- Headquarters: Lincoln, NE
- Region served: United States
- Fields: Pharmacy
- Members: 2057 (2016)
- Website: https://aapp.org/

The American Association of Psychiatric Pharmacists (AAPP) is a professional organization representing pharmacists and other health care professionals in the specialized areas of psychiatric and neurologic pharmacy practice within the United States. AAPP maintains "The Mental Health Pharmacy Directory", an online search engine that includes more than 850 mental health pharmacies.

As of December 2015, AAPP is a member of the Coalition on Psychiatric Emergencies (COPE) and is the only professional pharmacy organization represented on the coalition. In January 2017, AAPP was elected to membership status on the Joint Commission of Pharmacy Practitioners (JCPP). AAPP is the only Board of Pharmacy Specialties accredited provider of BCPP (Board Certified Psychiatric Pharmacist) recertification products.

== History ==
Much of what has been written about the history of AAPP comes from an article in the Encyclopedia of Clinical Pharmacy written by AAPP's (then CPNP's) second president (1999–2000), Alex A. Cardoni. Prior to the foundation of the CPNP, there was no formal professional organization focused on neuropsychiatric pharmacy, although pharmacists had been practicing in psychiatric and neurological practice settings. In October 1994, a group of pharmacists held a meeting in Austin, Texas, to discuss and plan the formation of a national professional organization dedicated to neuropsychiatric pharmacy. The resultant Conference of Psychiatric and Neurologic Pharmacists was composed of forty neuropsychiatric pharmacists, a special interest group of pharmacists that met at the American Society of Health System Pharmacists (ASHP) Annual Meetings and held a post-continuing education programming conference. Later, in the summer of 1997, a founding set of bylaws and an organizational constitution were drafted. After a call for founding members in 1997, their numbers increased to 116, and these are still considered the original, founding members. After approving the constitution and bylaws, CPNP was officially founded on March 24, 1998.

The first CPNP Board of Directors was elected and sworn in at CPNP's First Annual Meeting of the College of Psychiatric and Neurologic Pharmacists in Orlando, Florida from April 23 to 26, 1998. The elected officers were CPNP President Dr. Gary M. Levin, President-elect Alex Cardoni, Treasurer Dr. James E. Wilson, Secretary Dr. Cherry W. Jackson, and Directors-at-Large Dr. Lawrence J. Cohen, and Dr. Sally K. Guthrie. The new organization was led by its first president, Dr. Gary M. Levin, from 1998 to 1999.

List of former and current CPNP Presidents
President	Term
Gary Levin	1998–1999
Alex Cardoni	1999–2000
Roger Sommi	2000–2001
Cherry Jackson	2001–2002
Stanley Weber	2002–2003
Glen Stimmel	2003–2004
Larry Ereshefsky	2004–2005
Charles Caley	2005–2006
Matthew Fuller	2006–2007
Sheila Botts	2007–2008
Carla Cobb	2008–2009
Ann Richards	2009–2010
Steven Stoner	2010–2011
Jerry McKee	2011–2012
Rex S. Lott	2012–2013
Julie Dopheide	2013–2014
Steven Burghart	2014–2015
Raymond Love	2015–2016
Christopher Thomas	2016–2017
Deanna Kelly	2017–2018
Megan Ehret	2018–2019
Lisa Goldstone	2019–2020 (President)
Marshall Cates	2019–2020 (President-elect)

== Membership ==
As of 2016, CPNP had 2,057 members, 70% of whom are Board Certified Psychiatric Pharmacists (BCPPs). CPNP members primarily practice in the areas of clinical practice, education and training, drug policy, and research. Half of the members practice in a hospital setting (a little over half of those members practice in government supported hospitals, such as with the United States Department of Veterans Affairs), with the other half practicing in a number of settings, including private mental health practice (5%), pharmaceutical industry (7%), public mental health (8%), academia (12%), and others (18%, including long-term care, managed care, and primary care). CPNP members encompass a range of professional experience, and 71% are residency or fellowship trained.

Originally, the CPNP general body consisted of three major categories of membership: Active Members, Founding Members, and Corporate Members. Active Members represented the bulk of the organization, who were pharmacists that paid yearly membership dues. Founding Members represented the original, founding members of CPNP (116 members in total). Corporate Members represented both corporations and members of corporations. Those categories have since changed.

== Student chapters ==
CPNP Collegiate Chapter logo

Pharmacy students may start or join student chapters of CPNP at colleges and universities that have pharmacy schools with full-time pharmacy degree programs. Student chapters provide extracurricular activities for members. The structure of CPNP student chapters is similar to the structure of CPNP National's Board of Directors, with some notable differences: the governance of CPNP student chapters is called the "executive board", rather than the "board of directors"; CPNP student chapters lack a "Director-at-Large" office; CPNP student chapters are guided by "Chapter Advisors", who are faculty members at CPNP student chapter institutions; and CPNP student chapters may incorporate other officer positions (e.g. some chapters have elected a P1 or First Year Liaison, an officer that serves to represent the interests of the student chapter to the "P1", or first year pharmacy student, class at the member institution).

As of April 2017, there are 33 student chapters located at pharmacy schools within the United States. The first CPNP Student Chapter in the United States was at Nova Southeastern University. According to the CPNP website, student chapters are located at the following colleges and universities: Student chapters are often involved with local mental health organizations, such as the National Alliance on Mental Illness. For example, in March 2016, the University of Arizona's CPNP Student Chapter launched its "Stigma Free Campaign" in support of NAMI. The chapter has also participated in the local NAMI Walk in 2016, and has appointed a liaison to NAMI. Ohio Northern University's CPNP Student Chapter claims to host NAMI representatives at their meetings as well.

== Research ==
CPNP members are engaged in research topics of interest to the practice of neuropsychiatric pharmacy. For example, in 2016, the Yale School of Medicine reported that Dr. Douglas Boggs was awarded the Best Original Research Award by CPNP for his work on the motor effects of THC. Pharmacy Times reported CPNP's 2015 recipient of the Best Original Research Award, Dr. Kyle Burghardt, for his article titled, "The Pharmacoepigenetics of Metabolic Syndrome in Schizophrenia." The CPNP Foundation funds the "Defining The Future" Grant Program, which aims to fund research that will help shape and define the future of neuropsychiatric pharmacy practice.

CPNP has been recognized for the development and development of neuropsychiatric resources. In 2015, the American Academy of Addiction Psychiatry awarded CPNP with a $5,000 grant for the development of community pharmacy guidelines for the management of opioid use disorder, titled, "Opioid Use Disorders: Interventions for Community Pharmacists." The resource is now provided for free on the "SAMHSA-HRSA Center for Integrated Health Solutions" website, a collaboration of the Substance Abuse and Mental Health Services Administration (SAMHSA) and the US Department of Health and Human Services's Health Resources and Services Administration (HRSA). In 2014, the America Academy of Addiction Psychiatry awarded CPNP a $5,000 grant for the development of a training webinar titled, "Putting Naloxone Into Action," aimed at helping pharmacists learn how to develop overdose education and naloxone distribution programs.

== Annual meeting ==
AAPP meets annually to discuss topics in neuropsychiatric pharmacies, offer credit for BCPP recertification, and network with colleagues. The first annual meeting was held in Orlando, Florida, in 1998.

== Lobbying and advocacy ==
In collaboration with the American Pharmacists Association (APhA), AAPP has lobbied for pharmacist "provider status," a profession-wide political effort aimed at convincing the United States Congress to recognize the profession of pharmacy (pharmacists) as providers in the Social Security Act, Part E, §1861.

The primary advocacy arm of AAPP is its Government Affairs Council (GAC). Members are required to declare any disclosures of interest.

== Community service ==
AAPP members assist with NAMI's HelpLine and Medications Mental Health Medications website, as well as staff the “Ask the Pharmacist” booth at NAMI's annual convention. In 2006, the National Alliance on Mental Illness honored AAPP with its Excellence in Community Mental Health Services Award in recognition of "their outstanding efforts to educate people about the available medications for the treatment of mental illness."

AAPP is involved with educating the public on matters of mental health. Information from AAPP was cited in a 2017 article by CNN about the reality of suicide in the Philippines. AAPP is responsible for producing drug monographs hosted by NAMI, such as the monograph for risperidone.

== Publications ==
=== Mental Health Clinician ===
Mental Health Clinician
- Discipline: Psychiatric pharmacy
- Language: English
- Edited by: Amy M. VandenBerg, Amy Werremeyer

Publication details
- History: 2012–present
- Publisher: College of Psychiatric and Neurologic Pharmacists (United States)
- Frequency: Bimonthly
- Open access: Yes
- License: Creative Commons Attribution-NonCommercial 3.0 Unported

Standard abbreviations
- ISO 4: Ment. Health Clin.

Indexing
- ISSN: 2168-9709
- LCCN: 2012200467
- OCLC no.: 802251472

Links
- Journal homepage; Online archive

The Mental Health Clinician is a bimonthly open access medical journal covering neuropsychiatric pharmacy, psychopharmacology, and other topics in clinical pharmacy. It was established in 2012.

=== The CPNP Perspective ===
The CPNP Perspective is the official monthly newsletter of CPNP.

== See also ==
- List of pharmacy associations
