= New Investigator Award =

Type of academic research grant

A New Investigator Award is a type of funding grant awarded to "early career" academics in the sciences.

A wide array of entities offer New Investigator Awards, including:

- Engineering and Physical Sciences Research Council (UK)
- American Association of Colleges of Pharmacy
- American Medical Informatics Association
- European Human Behaviour and Evolution Association
- Canadian Association for Neuroscience
