= Letendre =

Letendre or Le Tendre is a surname of French origin, meaning "young man". Notable people with the surname include:

- Donald E. Letendre (born 1953), American professor and pharmacist
- Eugène Letendre (1931–2014), French racing cyclist
- Linell Letendre (fl. 1996–present), American brigadier general
- Pascale Letendre (born c. 1980), Canadian curler
- Rita Letendre (1928–2021), Canadian painter, muralist and printmaker
- Serge Le Tendre (born 1946), French comics writer
