= Juliane Nguyen =

American pharmaceutical scientist

Juliane Nguyen, PhD
- Pronunciation: [ŋʷǐˀən]
- Education: Philipps-Universität Marburg
- Known for: Protein Engineering, Complex Biologics, Live Biotherapeutics, Exosomes
- Awards: NSF CAREER, AAPS Emerging Leader, CMBE Young Innovator, NY-Star Faculty award, Fellow of the Controlled Release Society
- Scientific career
- Doctoral advisor: Thomas Kissel
- Other academic advisors: Francis Szoka
- Website: nguyenlab.web.unc.edu

Juliane Nguyen is a professor at UNC Eshelman School of Pharmacy and vice chair of the Division of Pharmacoengineering and Molecular Pharmaceutics (DPMP). She is the director of graduate admissions in DPMP at University of North Carolina at Chapel Hill.

== Career ==
She received her pharmacy degree and PhD from Philipps-Universität Marburg in Germany, completing her PhD in Thomas Kissel's group. After receiving her degrees, she completed a Post doc with Francis Szoka at University of California, San Francisco. Her research is focused on engineered live biotherapeutics, exosomes and lipid based drug delivery systems. She was awarded a National Science Foundation CAREER award in 2018 for her work as well as over $21M from the NIH and other funding sources.

In 2026, Nguyen was elected as director-at-large of the Controlled Release Society for the 2026-2029 term. She was elected a fellow of the American Association of Pharmaceutical Scientists and the American Institute for Medical and Biological Engineering in 2024, and a fellow of the Controlled Release Society in 2023. Additional recognitions include the Galenus Guest Professorship at ETH Zurich (2024), the AAPS Emerging Leader Award (2019), the Biomedical Engineering Society-Cellular and Molecular Bioengineering Young Innovator Award (2019), and the National Science Foundation CAREER Award (2018). Earlier in her career, she received the University at Buffalo Exceptional Young Investigator Award and the NYSTAR Faculty Award.

Editorial Service

- Executive Editor - Advanced Drug Delivery Reviews - 2021 to present
- Associate Editor at Cellular and Molecular Bioengineering (CMBE) - 2023
- International Advisory Board for ChemMedChem - 2021 to present

== Awards and honors ==
- Elected fellow - American Association of Pharmaceutical Scientists (2024)
- Galenus guest professorship - ETH Zurich (2024)
- Elected fellow - American Institute for Medical and Biological Engineering (AIMBE) (2024)
