= American Journal of Pharmaceutical Education =

- Discipline: Pharmaceutical education
- Language: English
- Edited by: Gayle A. Brazeau

Publication details
- History: 1937-present
- Publisher: American Association of Colleges of Pharmacy (United States)
- Frequency: Quarterly
- Open access: Yes

Standard abbreviations
- ISO 4: Am. J. Pharm. Educ.

Indexing
- CODEN: AJPDAD
- ISSN: 0002-9459 (print); 1553-6467 (web)
- OCLC no.: 01480171

Links
- Journal homepage; About AJPE

The American Journal of Pharmaceutical Education is the official publication of the American Association of Colleges of Pharmacy. According to the editors, the journal's purpose is "to document and advance pharmaceutical education in the United States and Internationally."

The Journal was founded in 1937 and absorbed Proceedings of the annual meeting of the American Conference of Pharmaceutical Faculties, which had been published under a couple of variant names between 1900 and 1937. As of 2010, the editor in chief was Joseph T. DiPiro, Executive Dean at the South Carolina College of Pharmacy.

The Journal's founding editor was Rufus A. Lyman (1875–1957), who served from 1937 to 1955. Lyman was a physician who held the post of Dean of Pharmacy at the Universities of Nebraska and Arizona. By 1971, C. Boyd Granberg was the Journal's editor.

The Journal began quarterly issues in 1988. Print publication ceased in 2005 (Volume 69) while online publication began two years earlier, in 2003.

== Abstracting and indexing ==
The journal is indexed by PubMed/Medline (1976–1989; 2006– ), Index Medicus (2006– ), Current Contents/Education, Current Contents/Life Sciences, International Pharmaceutical Abstracts, Current Index to Journals in Education, ProQuest, and EBSCO.

== Ranking and metrics ==
The journal exhibited unusual levels of self-citation and its journal impact factor of 2019 was suspended from Journal Citation Reports in 2020, a sanction which hit 34 journals in total.

The typical volume of content published in the Journal annually increased from less than 100 articles before 2003 to more than 300 articles after 2011.
