= CPNP =

CPNP may refer to:

- College of Psychiatric and Neurologic Pharmacists, a professional organization for neuropsychiatric pharmacists
- Certified pediatric nurse practitioner, a nurse practitioner that specializes in care to newborns, infants, toddlers, pre-schoolers, school-aged children, adolescents, and young adults
- Country and Progressive National Party, a short-lived conservative political party in the Australian state of Queensland
