= University at Buffalo School of Pharmacy and Pharmaceutical Sciences =

University in New York

- Type: Public university
- Established: 1886
- Parent institution: State University of New York at Buffalo
- Dean: Gary M. Pollack, PhD
- Academic staff: 60
- Administrative staff: 72
- Students: 615
- Website: http://pharmacy.buffalo.edu

The University at Buffalo School of Pharmacy and Pharmaceutical Sciences is in Buffalo, NY. It is part of the SUNY system through the State University of New York at Buffalo.

== History ==
The University at Buffalo School of Pharmacy and Pharmaceutical Sciences, Founded in 1886, is the second-oldest component of the University at Buffalo and is the only pharmacy school in the State University of New York (SUNY) system. The UB School of Pharmacy and Pharmaceutical Sciences is the birthplace of pharmacokinetics and pharmacodynamics.

== Accreditation ==
The UB School of Pharmacy and Pharmaceutical Sciences is accredited by the Accreditation Council for Pharmacy Education. The current accreditation period is through June 30, 2028.

== Departments ==
- Pharmaceutical Sciences
- Pharmacy Practice

== Rankings and reputation ==
In 2024, the school was ranked tied for 19th best pharmacy school in the nation by U.S. News & World Report.

== See also ==
- List of pharmacy schools in the United States
