= Donald E. Letendre =

American university professor and pharmacist

- Born: 1953 (age 72–73)
- Children: 4 children

Academic background
- Education: BS., Massachusetts College of Pharmacy and Health Sciences; PharmD., University of Kentucky

Academic work
- Discipline: Pharmacy
- Institutions: University of Iowa; University of Rhode Island

Donald E. Letendre is an American university professor and pharmacist. He serves as a professor at the University of Iowa College of Pharmacy. He is a past Dean of the University of Iowa College of Pharmacy.

In 2020, he was inducted into the University of Kentucky's Hall of Distinguished Alumni by his peers.

== Career ==
In 2024 after serving for 17 years, Letendre stepped down as dean of the University of Iowa College of Pharmacy. He remains on faculty as a professor in the Department of Pharmacy. In 2007 Letendre was appointed Dean and Professor of the University of Iowa College of Pharmacy overseeing 100+ faculty and 850+ preceptors.

Prior to joining the University of Iowa, he served for six years as Dean and Professor at the University of Rhode Island and Executive Secretary of the Rhode Island State Crime Laboratory Commission.

Letendre was also on the executive staff of the American Society of Health-System Pharmacists (ASHP), serving for much of that time as Director of the Accreditation Services Division. At ASHP his responsibilities included all matters concerning postgraduate pharmacy residency and technician training programs.

== Education ==
Letendre received his Bachelor of Science in Pharmacy from the Massachusetts College of Pharmacy.

He then earned a Doctorate of Pharmacy from the University of Kentucky.

He received postgraduate residency training at the University of Kentucky Albert B. Chandler Medical Center, serving his final year as Chief Resident.

== Honors & Peer Accolades ==
- 1989, Letendre was designated an Honorary Resident by the Montefiore Medical Center in New York.
- 1993, Recognized by his peers as an Honorary Resident by the University of Wisconsin Hospital and Clinics.
- 1998, Recipient of the University of Kentucky's prestigious Paul F. Parker Lecture Award.
- 1999, Received the Massachusetts College of Pharmacy's 1999 Outstanding Alumni Achievement Award.
- 2014, Appointed to oversee construction of a $96.3 million, 296,000 square foot facility, housing pharmacy education, research, and sterile product manufacturing at the University of Iowa.
- 2020, Honored with the national Outstanding Dean award by the American Pharmacists Association, Academy of Student Pharmacists. This award recognizes a college of pharmacy dean who has made significant contributions to the APhA-ASP Chapter and promoted the welfare of student pharmacists through community service, leadership, and professional activities.
