= Drake University College of Pharmacy & Health Sciences =

Coordinates: 41°36′4″N 93°39′8″W

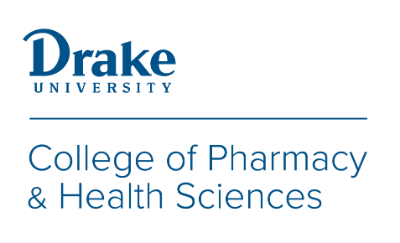
- Type: Private
- Established: 1882
- Parent institution: Drake University
- Accreditation: Accreditation Council for Pharmacy Education
- Dean: Renae Chesnut
- Location: Des Moines, Iowa, United States
- Campus: Urban
- Website: www.drake.edu/cphs/

The Drake University College of Pharmacy & Health Sciences is located in Des Moines, Iowa. The school, part of Drake University, offers a four-year Doctor of Pharmacy (Pharm.D) degree, and is nationally accredited by the Accreditation Council for Pharmacy Education. As of 2020 Drake's pharmacy school was ranked 46th in the United States.
