= VCU School of Pharmacy =

Pharmacy school in Virginia, US

Coordinates: 37.5409°N 77.4301°W

VCU School of Pharmacy was founded in 1898 as part of the Medical College of Virginia. It consistently has been ranked among the top 20 pharmacy schools in the United States by U.S. News & World Report. From 2014 until June 2022 the school was headed by Dean Joseph T. DiPiro. It currently is led by Dean K.C. Ogbonna.

The school enrolls approximately 400 students in its Doctor of Pharmacy program.

Research and Ph.D. programs in the School of Pharmacy include Medicinal Chemistry, Pharmaceutics and Pharmacotherapy and Outcomes Science. Centers for research and practice in the school include:

- Center for Biomarker Research and Precision Medicine
- Center for Compounding Practice and Research
- Center for Pharmacy Practice Innovation
- Institute for Structural Biology, Drug Discovery and Development
