= Comprehensive medication management =

Comprehensive medication management (CMM) is the process of delivering clinical services aimed at ensuring a patient's medications (including prescribed, over-the-counter, vitamins, supplements and alternative) are individually assessed to determine that they have an appropriate reason for use, are efficacious for treating their respective medical condition or helping meet defined patient or clinical goals, are safe considering comorbidities and other medications being taken, and are able to be taken by the patient as intended without difficulty.

CMM is generally delivered directly by a pharmacist in a clinic setting, in collaboration with other health care providers including primary care providers, nurse care coordinators, social workers, dietitians, diabetes educators, behavioral health, and more. Pharmacists who conduct CMM generally have a collaborative practice agreement with a physician at their site of practice, allowing them to prescribe and adjust medications for several chronic conditions including high blood pressure, diabetes, high cholesterol, asthma, chronic-obstructive pulmonary disease, anticoagulation management and smoking cessation among others.

Beyond assessing a patient's medications in their present state, the pharmacist delivering CMM will work with the patient to develop goals for the utilization of drug therapy, and schedule continual follow-up to ensure these goals are met. A key component of CMM is patient-centeredness, referring to the process by which the patient understands and agrees to the goals of therapy and actively participates in the plan for care.
