= Pharmacotherapy (journal) =

- Discipline: Pharmacotherapy
- Language: English
- Edited by: C. Lindsay DeVane

Publication details
- History: 1981–present
- Publisher: Wiley-Blackwell
- Frequency: Monthly
- Open access: Hybrid
- Impact factor: 6.251 (2021)

Standard abbreviations
- ISO 4: Pharmacotherapy

Indexing
- CODEN: PHPYDQ
- ISSN: 0277-0008 (print); 1875-9114 (web)
- OCLC no.: 07491625

Links
- Journal homepage; Online access; Online archive; Journal page on publisher's website

Pharmacotherapy: The Journal of Human Pharmacology and Drug Therapy is a monthly peer-reviewed medical journal covering human pharmacology and pharmacotherapy, published by Wiley-Blackwell on behalf of the American College of Clinical Pharmacy, of which it is an official journal. It was established in 1981 under founding editor-in-chief Russel R. Miller. The second editor was Richard T. Scheife. The third and current editor is C. Lindsay DeVane. Initially published six times a year the journal has been a monthly since 1991.

== Abstracting and indexing ==
The journal is abstracted and indexed in:

- Academic OneFile
- Academic Search
- BIOSIS Previews
- Chemical Abstracts
- CAB Abstracts
- Current Contents/Clinical Medicine
- Elsevier BIOBASE
- Embase
- Global Health
- Index Medicus/MEDLINE/PubMed
- International Bibliography of Periodical Literature
- Referativnyi Zhurnal
- Science Citation Index
- Scopus
- Tropical Diseases Bulletin

According to the Journal Citation Reports, the journal has a 2021 impact factor of 6.251, ranking it 44th out of 279 journals in the category "Pharmacology & Pharmacy".
