= Clinical pharmacy =

Branch of pharmacy for direct provision

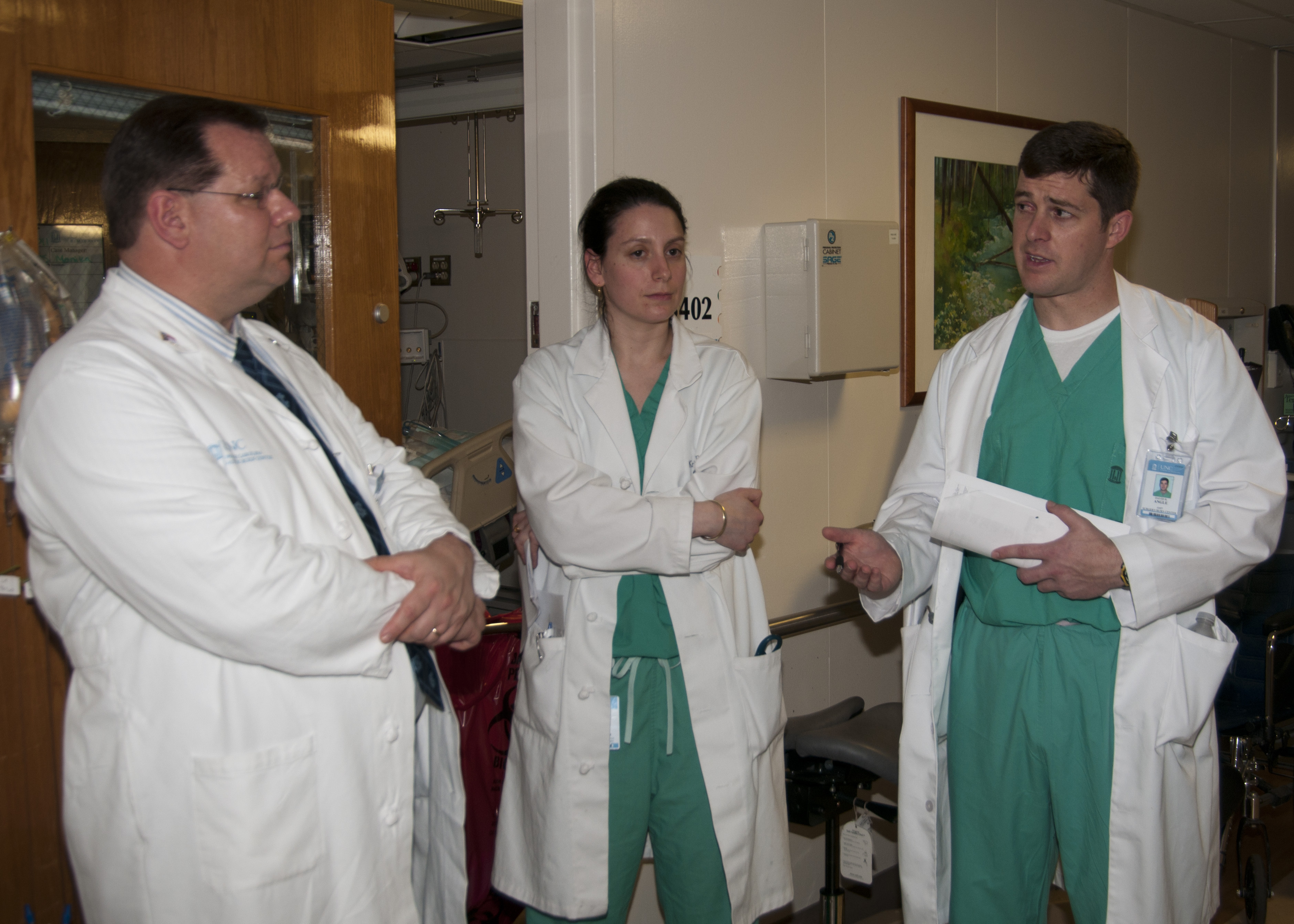
Clinical pharmacists go on rounds with doctors in order to provide direct patient care and comprehensive medication management.

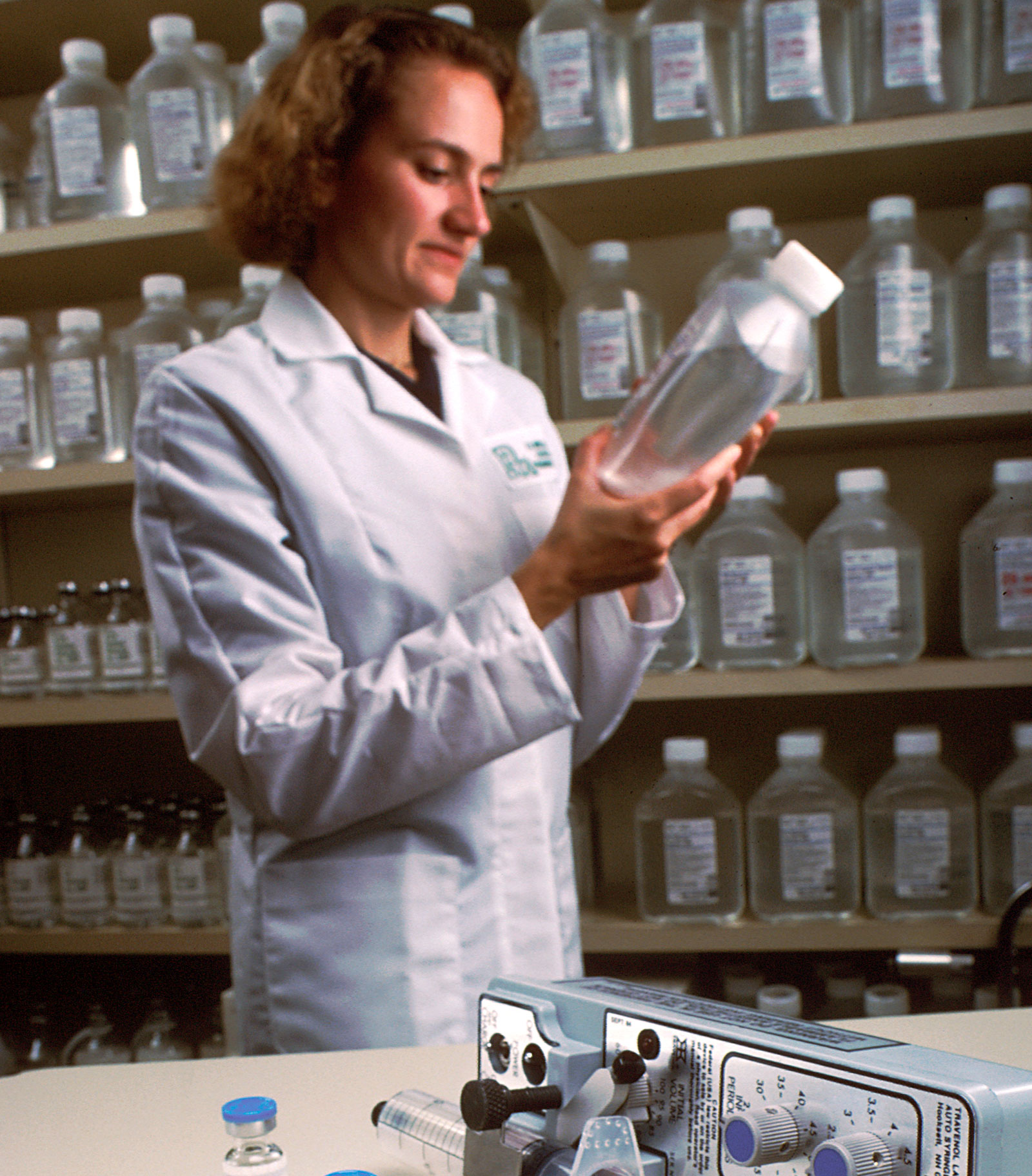
A hospital pharmacist is checking a liquid solution.

Clinical pharmacy is the branch of pharmacy in which clinical pharmacists provide direct patient care that optimizes the use of medication and promotes health, wellness, and disease prevention. Clinical pharmacists care for patients in all health care settings, but the clinical pharmacy movement initially began inside hospitals and clinics. Clinical pharmacists often work in collaboration with physicians, physician assistants, nurse practitioners, and other healthcare professionals. Clinical pharmacists can enter into a formal collaborative practice agreement with another healthcare provider, generally one or more physicians, that allows pharmacists to prescribe medications and order laboratory tests.

== Education and credentialing ==
Clinical pharmacists have extensive education in the biomedical, pharmaceutical, socio-behavioural and clinical sciences. Most clinical pharmacists have a Doctor of Pharmacy (Pharm.D.) degree and many have completed one or more years of post-graduate training (for example, a general and/or specialty pharmacy residency). In the United States, clinical pharmacists can choose to become Board-certified through the Board of Pharmacy Specialties (BPS), which was organized in 1976 as an independent certification agency of the American Pharmacists Association. The BPS certifies pharmacists in the following specialties:

- Ambulatory care pharmacy (BCACP)
- Critical care pharmacy (BCCCP)
- Nuclear pharmacy (BCNP)
- Nutrition support pharmacy (BCNSP)
- Oncology pharmacy (BCOP)
- Pediatric pharmacy (BCPPS)
- Geriatric pharmacy (BCGP)
- Pharmacotherapy (BCPS)
- Infectious disease pharmacy (BCIDP)
- Compounded sterile preparations pharmacy (BCSCP)
- Cardiology pharmacy (BCCP)
- Emergency medicine pharmacy (BCEMP)
- Transplant Pharmacist (BCTXP)
- Psychiatric pharmacy (BCPP)

There are several types of clinical pharmacists in the United States. In California they are called advanced practice pharmacists (APh). In New Mexico, they are known as Pharmacist Clinicians (PhC) and lastly in Montana and North Carolina they are known as Clinical Pharmacist Practitioners (CPP). Clinical pharmacists in the Veteran Administration are known as Clinical Pharmacy Specialists (CPS).

Role in the health care system

Within the system of health care, clinical pharmacists are experts in the therapeutic use of medications. They routinely provide medication therapy evaluations and recommendations to patients and other health care professionals. Clinical pharmacists are a primary source of scientifically valid information and advice regarding the safe, appropriate, and cost-effective use of medications. Clinical pharmacists are also making themselves more readily available to the public. In the past, access to a clinical pharmacist was limited to hospitals, clinics, or educational institutions. However, clinical pharmacists are making themselves available through a medication information hotline, and reviewing medication lists, all in an effort to prevent medication errors in the foreseeable future. In the United Kingdom, clinical pharmacists are routinely involved in the direct care of patients within hospitals, and increasingly, in doctors surgeries. They also develop post registration professional education, professional curricula for workforce development, provide expertise on the use of medicines to national organizations such as NICE, the Department of Health, and the MHRA, and develop medicines guidelines for use in therapeutic areas.

Clinical pharmacists interact directly with patients in several different ways. They use their knowledge of medication (including dosage, drug interactions, side effects, expense, effectiveness, etc.) to determine if a medication plan is appropriate for their patient. If it is not, the pharmacist will consult the primary physician to ensure that the patient is on the proper medication plan. The pharmacist also works to educate their patients on the importance of taking and finishing their medications. Studies conducted into Pharmacist-led Chronic Disease Management show that it was associated with effects similar to usual care and might improve physiological goal attainment.

In some states in the USA, clinical pharmacists are given prescriptive authority under protocol with a medical provider, and their scope of practice is constantly evolving. In the United Kingdom clinical pharmacists are given independent prescriptive authority.

Basic components of clinical pharmacy practice include prescribing drugs, administering drugs, monitoring prescriptions, managing drug use, and counselling patients.

== See also ==
- History of pharmacy
- Hospital pharmacy
