= University of Iowa College of Pharmacy =

Pharmacy school

Coordinates: 41.659599°N 91.545406°W

- Type: Public
- Established: 1885
- Dean: Jill M Kolesar
- Faculty: 100+ faculty, 850+ preceptors
- Students: 417 PharmD and 55 PhD
- Location: 180 S. Grand Avenue, Iowa City, Iowa, 52242
- Website: pharmacy.uiowa.edu

The University of Iowa College of Pharmacy is an accredited pharmacy school located in Iowa City, Iowa. The college offers three undergraduate certificates, four areas of graduate study leading to the Doctor of Philosophy (PhD) degree, and a four-year professional program leading to the Doctor of Pharmacy (PharmD) degree. University of Iowa Pharmaceuticals (UIP), an FDA-registered manufacturer, is housed within the college. UIP is the largest and longest-running university-affiliated pharmaceutical manufacturing facility in the U.S.

In 2020 it was ranked 18th in the country on a list of best pharmacy schools by U.S. News & World Report.

== History ==
The University of Iowa Department of Pharmacy was founded in 1885, with E.L. Boerner serving as its first dean. In 1900 the college became a founding member of the American Association of Colleges of Pharmacy (AACP), and shortly after changed their name to the College of Pharmacy.

In 1938 the University of Iowa established the first graduate program in hospital pharmacy in the country, and in 1963 their building moved to its current home on the west side of campus.

The college continued their achievements well through the 20th century, founding the Iowa Drug Information Service and developing the national-standard Unit Dose System in 1965, before establishing the landmark Center for Biocatalysis and Bioprocessing in 1983.

In 2009 the college was restructured, moving from three academic divisions to two departments: the Department of Pharmacy Practice and the Department of Pharmaceutical Sciences and Experimental Therapeutics.

In 2016 the college broke ground on a new facility, set to open to students in the spring of 2020.

== Profile ==
The college is accredited by the Accreditation Council for Pharmacy Education (ACPE), an independent agency recognized by the US Department of Education to accredit schools of pharmacy.

Each entering class to the college consists of around 120 students. The total student body has close to 420 PharmD students and 55 PhD candidates. The program keeps over 100 faculty on staff and boasts over 850 preceptors located at 430 sites.
