= Center for Mathematical Modeling =

Research center in Chile

Coordinates: 33.4574°S 70.6645°W

The Center for Mathematical Modeling (CMM) was created in 2000 to encompass research and training activities that were being conducted by members of the Department of Mathematical Engineering at Universidad de Chile. Today, it features a range of activities from fundamental research in applied mathematics to industry-oriented research and education. The Center is a base for international collaboration; it hosts an increasing number of engineering and Ph.D. students as well as postdoctoral fellows, and provides a scientific counterpart to their industrial partners.

== Origins ==
The CMM was founded by members of the Department of Mathematical Engineering (DIM) at the Universidad de Chile with the aid of a FONDAP-CONICYT project. From its inception, the Center was an associated international unit of the Centre National de la Recherche Scientifique (CNRS), the first in mathematics outside France. The CMM is physically housed in the Faculty of Physical and Mathematical Science, which contains the oldest, most prestigious and productive engineering school in Chile. As a consequence the Center has a strong link with departments in this school -industrial, mechanical, civil, electrical, computer science and earth science- and benefits from access to the 4.000 strong student population of the school and to more than 500 graduated students in diverse fields and engineering.
