= Hospital Practice =

- Discipline: Hospital medicine
- Language: English

Publication details
- History: 1966–present
- Publisher: Informa Healthcare
- Frequency: Quarterly

Standard abbreviations
- ISO 4: Hosp. Pract.

Indexing
- ISSN: 2154-8331 (print); 2377-1003 (web)
- LCCN: 2002204442
- OCLC no.: 50932107

Links
- Journal homepage; Online archive

Hospital Practice is a quarterly peer-reviewed medical journal covering hospital medicine. It is published by Informa Healthcare and was established in 1966. The journal is indexed in Index Medicus/MEDLINE/PubMed.
