= Molecular tumor board =

A Molecular Tumor Board (MTB) is a dedicated group of medical experts to evaluate hard-to-treat cancers and provide a personalized healthcare opportunity. It has also been called a Sequencing Tumor Board and it is characterized by the in-depth application of molecular analysis (e.g. genomics and transcriptomics) for a single patient. Molecular Tumor Boards are considered most useful for cancer types for which therapies are not effective, for example, in the case of heterogeneous sarcomas. The boards are composed by clinical oncologists and pathologists alongside other specialists, which vary from institution to institution, but might include geneticists, bioinformaticians and molecular biologists. MTBs are considered to improve clinical outcomes for patients with tumors with unique molecular profiles.

Molecular Tumour Boards have been used by a number of institutions, like the Dartmouth–Hitchcock Medical Center, the Johns Hopkins Hospital and the Moffitt Cancer Center.
