= University of Minnesota College of Pharmacy =

Coordinates: 44°58′24.2″N 93°13′51.2″W

The University of Minnesota College of Pharmacy is the pharmacy school of the University of Minnesota. It has two campus locations: in Minneapolis and Duluth, Minnesota. The University of Minnesota College of Pharmacy is part of one of the largest Academic Health Centers (AHC) in the United States. This center allows health professionals to train collaboratively during the course of their training programs. The AHC comprises the College of Pharmacy, School of Dentistry, Medical School, School of Nursing, School of Public Health, and the College of Veterinary Medicine:.

== History ==
The University of Minnesota College of Pharmacy opened in 1892 with Frederick J. Wulling serving as Dean. Only six of the original 15 students completed the two-year program on time and were granted a pharmaceutical doctor degree in 1894. Three years later the first women were admitted to the college, all of whom graduated.

Wulling established a nationally recognized medicinal plant garden at the university. He dedicated two acres to the exclusive cultivation of the heart stimulant digitalis, which helped produce over 20,000 bottles of tincture during World War I.

Wulling's successors as dean are:

- Charles Rogers, 1936-1957
- George Hager, 1957-1965
- Lawrence Weaver, 1966-1984
- Gilbert Banker, 1985-1992
- Bob Cipolle (Interim), 1992-1994
- Lawrence Weaver (Interim), 1994-1996
- Marilyn Speedie, 1996-2017
- Lynda Welage, 2017-2024
- Amy Pittenger (Interim), 2024-2025
- R. Kip Guy, 2025-

The Duluth program began in 2003 and was intended to address the severe shortage of pharmacists in Minnesota, especially in Greater Minnesota, at that time.

== Academics ==
The University of Minnesota College of Pharmacy offers the Doctor of Pharmacy degree (PharmD), Master of Science (MS) and Doctoral (PhD) degrees, and dual-degree programs for students interested in combining their pharmacy education with a degree in public health (PharmD/MPH), or business (PharmD/MBA).

In addition, the University of Minnesota College of Pharmacy also has pharmacy residency as part of its education programs.

The Twin Cities campus enrolls approximately 100 PharmD students per class, while the Duluth campus enrolls approximately 50 students per class.

== Ranking ==
In 2024, U.S. News & World Report ranked the University of Minnesota College of Pharmacy sixth in the United States.

== Notable faculty and alumni ==
- Gunda Georg
- Philip S. Portoghese
- Robert Vince
