= UC San Diego Skaggs School of Pharmacy =

Pharmacy school at UC San Diego

UC San Diego Skaggs School of Pharmacy and Pharmaceutical Sciences
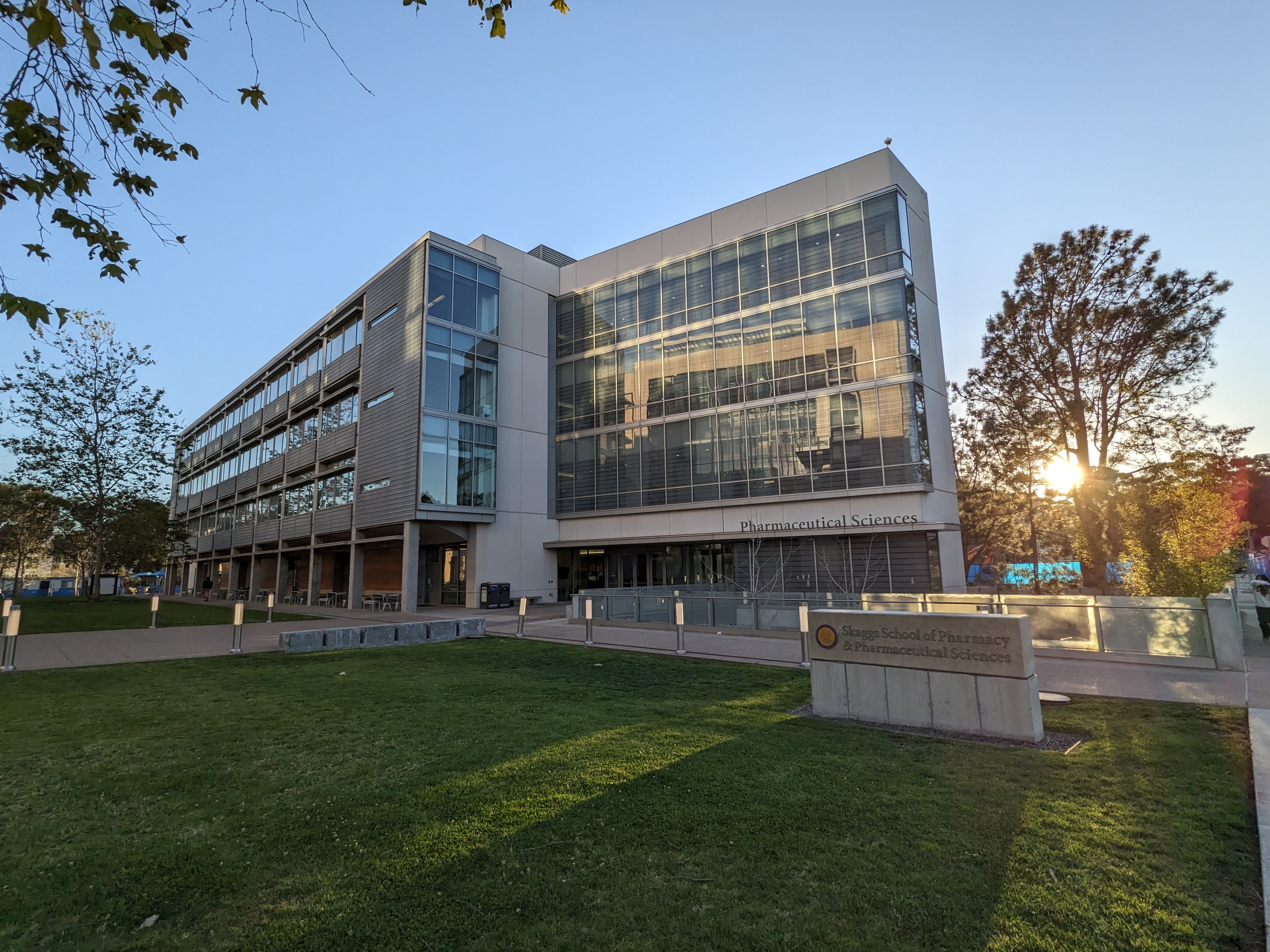
- Type: Public
- Established: 2002; 24 years ago
- Parent institution: University of California, San Diego
- Dean: Brookie M. Best, PharmD, MAS
- Academic staff: 32
- Postgraduates: 330
- Location: San Diego, California, United States; 32.874°N 117.236°W
- Website: pharmacy.ucsd.edu
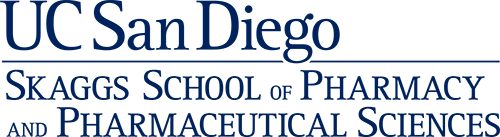

The UC San Diego Skaggs School of Pharmacy and Pharmaceutical Sciences is a graduate-level pharmacy school at the University of California, San Diego.

== History ==
The pharmacy school was authorized by the Regents of the University of California in 2000. The inaugural class began in fall 2002 with 25 Doctorate of Pharmacy students, and graduated the first class of students in the Spring of 2006. The school was renamed "Skaggs School of Pharmacy and Pharmaceutical Sciences" on November 4, 2004, in recognition of a $30 million gift, the largest ever to UC San Diego Health Sciences, from the Skaggs Institute of Research.

On May 2, 2006, the school opened the doors of its new four story and 110,000-square-foot (10,000 m^{2}) facility to house all of its academic and research operations.

Prior to the establishment of the school, San Diego was the largest metropolitan city in the United States without a local pharmacy school.

== Programs ==
Skaggs School offers five academic programs that produce degrees in the pharmaceutical industry:

- Doctor of Pharmacy (Pharm.D.) degree awarded in a four-year program
- Joint Bachelor of Science (BS) in Chemistry and Pharm.D. degree awarded in a seven-year program in cooperation with UCSD's Department of Chemistry and Biochemistry
- Dual Pharm.D. and Ph.D. in Biomedical Sciences
- Ph.D. in Pharmaceutical Sciences and Drug Development
- M.S. in Drug Development and Product Management

Skaggs Schools also offers four post-graduation fellowship opportunities.
