= UNC Eshelman School of Pharmacy =

Coordinates: 35.9070°N 79.0534°W

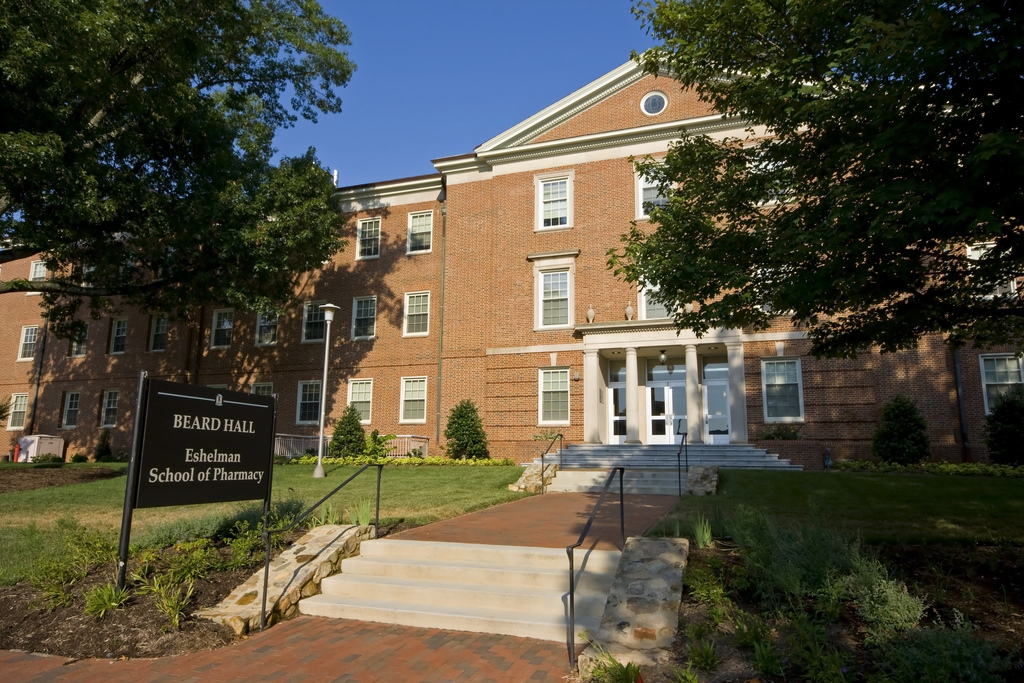
- Beard Hall, one of the buildings housing the School
- Former name: UNC School of Pharmacy (1897–2008)
- Established: 1897
- Location: Chapel Hill, North Carolina
- Website: pharmacy.unc.edu

The UNC Eshelman School of Pharmacy is the pharmacy school of the University of North Carolina at Chapel Hill, a public university in Chapel Hill, North Carolina. The school of pharmacy also maintains a satellite campus at UNC Asheville.

== History ==
The UNC School of Pharmacy was officially renamed the UNC Eshelman School of Pharmacy on May 21, 2008, following Eshelman’s 2007 donation of $30 million to the school.

Robert A. Blouin was the Dean of the school from 2003 to 2017, until he became the school's Provost in 2017. Dr. Dhiren Thakker was appointed interim dean, and turned the position over to Dr. Angela Kashuba when she became the college's first woman Dean since the inception of the historic school.

== Academics ==
The school offers a Doctor of Pharmacy degree, a Master of Science in Pharmaceutical Sciences with a specialization in health system pharmacy administration, and a PhD in Pharmaceutical Sciences with an emphasis in four research areas.

The Asheville School of Pharmacy campus opened in 2011, and graduated its first class in 2015.
