= American College of Clinical Pharmacy =

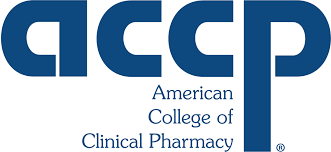
- Abbreviation: ACCP
- Formation: 1979
- Type: Professional association
- Headquarters: Lenexa, Kansas
- Region served: United States
- Fields: Clinical pharmacy
- Members: Over 15,000
- Website: https://www.accp.com/

The American College of Clinical Pharmacy (ACCP) is a pharmacy professional association representing the interests of clinical pharmacists. ACCP is the publisher of Pharmacotherapy and JACCP: Journal of the American College of Clinical Pharmacy.

According to the ACCP, its purpose is to advance human health by extending the frontiers of clinical pharmacy. It has more than 15,000 members.
