= Board of Pharmacy Specialties =

- Abbreviation: BPS
- Formation: 1976
- Type: Professional association
- Headquarters: Washington, DC
- Region served: United States
- Fields: Pharmacy
- Members: (2016)
- Executive Director: William M. Ellis
- Website: http://www.bpsweb.org/

The Board of Pharmacy Specialties (BPS) was established in 1976 and is an independent division of the American Pharmacists Association that grants recognition within the United States to appropriate pharmacy practice specialities and establish standards for certification of pharmacists in 14 specialities. Specialty examinations are accredited by National Commission for Certifying Agencies (NCCA), the accreditation body of Institute for Credentialing Excellence (ICE).

The executive director of the BPS is William M. Ellis.

== Specialties ==
The BPS recognizes 14 specialties:

- Ambulatory Care (BCACP) established in 2009
- Cardiology (BCCP) established in 2017
- Compounded Sterile Preparations (BCSCP) established in 2018
- Critical Care (BCCCP) established in 2013
- Emergency Medicine (BCEMP) established in 2020
- Geriatrics (BCGP) established in 2017 under BPS and in 1997 under Commission for Certification in Geriatric Pharmacy
- Infectious Diseases (BCIDP) established in 2017
- Nuclear (BCNP) established in 1978
- Nutrition Support (BCNSP) established in 1988
- Oncology (BCOP) established in 1996
- Pediatric (BCPPS) established in 2013
- Pharmacotherapy (BCPS) established in 1988
- Psychiatric (BCPP) established in 1994
- Solid Organ Transplantation (BCTXP) established in 2018

== See also ==
- Board of Pharmacy
