= Accreditation Council for Pharmacy Education =

Accreditation agency recognized by Council on Higher Education Accreditation in the US

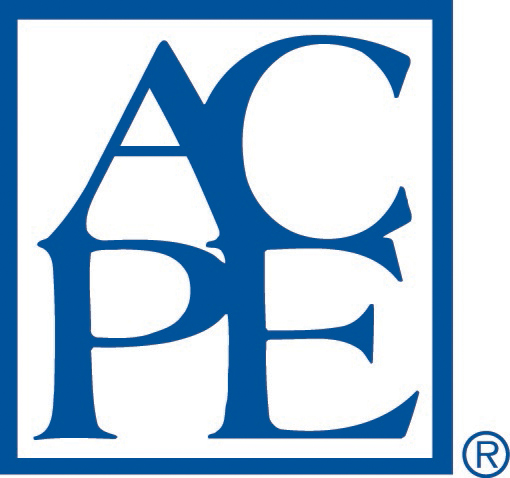
- Abbreviation: ACPE
- Formation: 1932 (as American Council on Pharmaceutical Education)
- Type: Non-profit accreditation agency
- Headquarters: 190 S. LaSalle Street, Suite 3000
- Location: Chicago, Illinois, U.S.
- Services: Pharmacy education accreditation, continuing education provider accreditation
- Executive Director: Jan Engle
- Board President: Michael A. Moné
- Affiliations: Council for Higher Education Accreditation; U.S. Department of Education
- Website: www.acpe-accredit.org

Accreditation Council for Pharmacy Education (ACPE) is a non-profit accreditation national agency recognized by Council on Higher Education Accreditation and the US Department of Education.It was established in 1932 as the American Council on Pharmaceutical Education and was renamed as the Accreditation Council for Pharmacy Education in 2003.ACPE is based in Chicago and accredits and pre-accredits schools offering PharmD degrees and providers of continuing pharmacy education. The accrediting body is made up of professionals from the American Council on Education, the American Association of Colleges of Pharmacy, the American Pharmacists Association, and the National Association of Boards of Pharmacy.

== See also ==
- List of recognized accreditation associations of higher learning
- Higher education accreditation in the United States
- List of pharmacy schools in the United States
- List of pharmacy schools
