= American Association of Colleges of Pharmacy =

Pharmacy college in the United States

- Abbreviation: AACP
- Founded: 1900
- Headquarters: Arlington, VA
- Region served: United States
- Field: Pharmacy education
- Website: http://www.aacp.org/

The American Association of Colleges of Pharmacy (AACP) is the national organization representing the interests of pharmacy education. Founded in 1900, AACP comprises all accredited colleges and schools with pharmacy degree programs, including more than 6,400 faculty, 63,800 students enrolled in professional programs, and 4,800 individuals pursuing graduate study in the field of pharmacy.

AACP provides member services – including meetings and events, webinars, continuing education, publications, reports and searchable directories for faculty, speakers and grants. AACP also works to promote the profession of pharmacy and the value of pharmacy education to audiences beyond the academic community.
