= List of pharmacy schools =

Notable pharmacy schools include the following, listed by country:

== A ==
=== Albania ===
Affiliated institution	School	Location	Ref.
University of Tirana	Department of Pharmacy	Tirana	

=== Algeria ===
Affiliated institution	School	Location	Ref
Batna 2 University	Department of Pharmacy.	Batna	

=== Argentina ===
Affiliated institution	School	Location	Ref.
John F. Kennedy University of Argentina	Department of Biology	Buenos Aires	
Maimónides University	Department of Pharmacy	Buenos Aires	
University of Buenos Aires	Faculty of Pharmacy and Biochemistry, University of Buenos Aires	Buenos Aires	
National University of Córdoba	Faculty of Chemical Sciences	Córdoba	
National University of La Plata	Department of Biological Sciences	La Plata	
National University of San Luis	Faculty of Chemistry, Biochemistry and Pharmacy	San Luis	

=== Australia ===
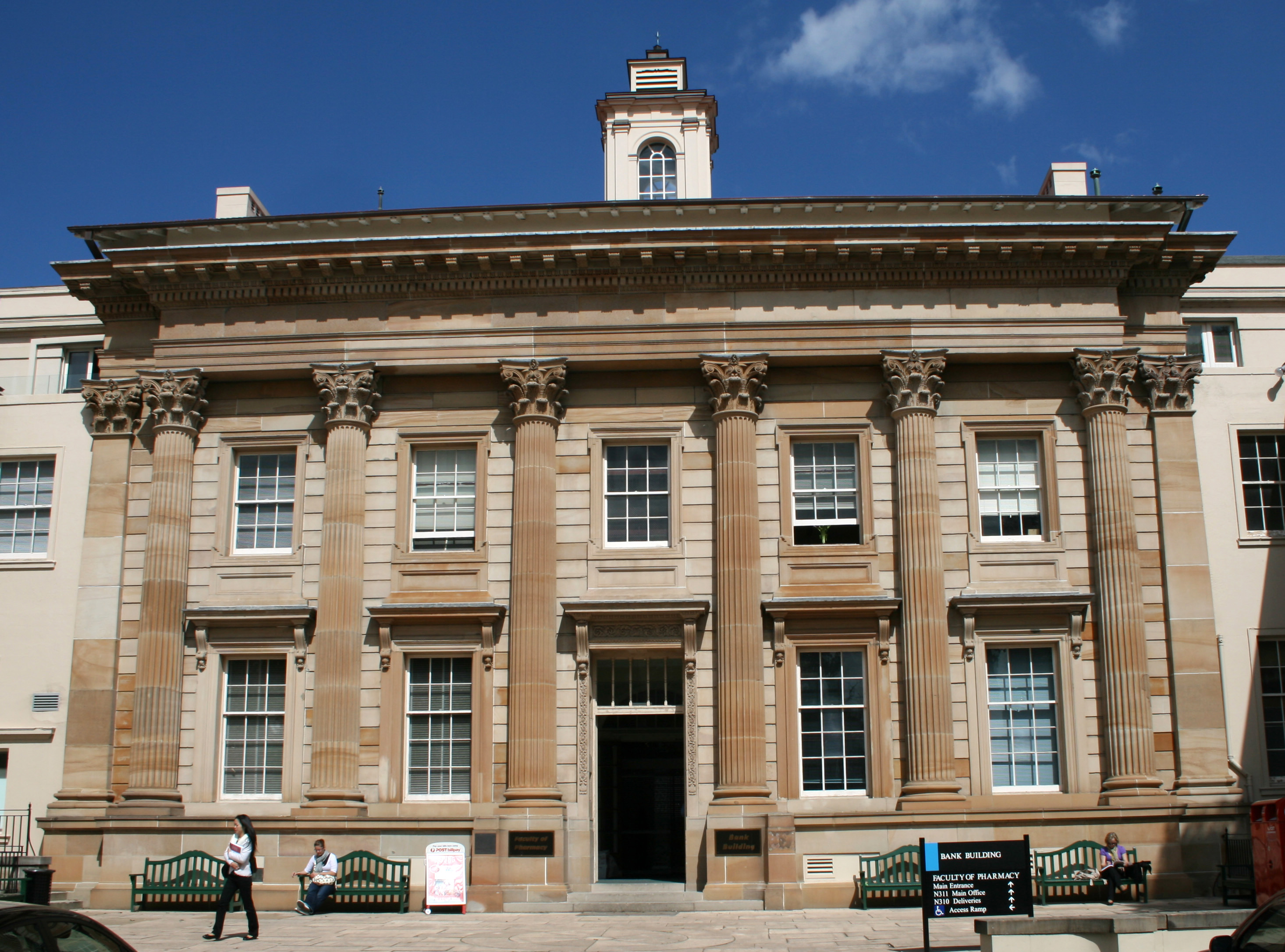
The University of Sydney Faculty of Pharmacy building

Affiliated institution	School	Location	Ref.
Charles Darwin University	Faculty of Health	multiple	
Charles Sturt University	School of Biomedical Science	multiple	
Curtin University of Technology	School of Pharmacy	Bentley	
Griffith University	School of Pharmacy	multiple	
James Cook University	School of Pharmacy	multiple	
La Trobe University	School of Pharmacy	Melbourne	
Monash University	Faculty of Pharmacy and Pharmaceutical Sciences	Parkville	
Queensland University of Technology	School of Life Science	Brisbane	
RMIT University	School of Medical Sciences	Melbourne	
University of Canberra	Faculty of Health	Bruce	
University of Newcastle	School of Biomedical Sciences and Pharmacy	Callaghan	
University of New England	Discipline of Pharmacy	Armidale	
University of Queensland	School of Pharmacy	Brisbane	
University of South Australia	School of Pharmacy and Medical Sciences	Adelaide	
University of Sydney	Faculty of Pharmacy	Sydney	
University of Tasmania	Tasmanian School of Pharmacy	Tasmania	
University of Technology, Sydney	Graduate School of Health	Sydney	
University of Western Australia	School of Medicine and Pharmacology	Perth	

=== Austria ===
Affiliated institution	School	Location	Ref.
University of Graz	Institute of Pharmaceutical Chemistry	Graz	
University of Innsbruck	Faculty of Chemistry and Pharmacology	Innsbruck	
University of Vienna	Institute of Pharmaceutical Chemistry	Vienna	

== B ==
=== Bangladesh ===
Affiliated institution	School	Location	Ref.
ASA University Bangladesh	Department of Pharmacy	Dhaka	
Atish Dipankar University of Science and Technology	Department of pharmacy	Dhaka	
Bangabandhu Sheikh Mujibur Rahman Science and Technology University	Department of Pharmacy	Gopalganj	
Bangladesh University	Department of Pharmacy	Dhaka	
BGC Trust University	Department of Pharmacy	Dhaka	
BRAC University	Department of Pharmacy	Dhaka	
Comilla University	Department of Pharmacy	Comilla	
Daffodil International University	Department of Pharmacy	Dhaka	
Dhaka International University	Department of Pharmacy	Dhaka	
East West University	Department of Pharmacy	Dhaka	
Gono University	Department of Pharmacy	Dhaka	
Independent University, Bangladesh	Department of Pharmacy	Dhaka	
International Islamic University	Department of Pharmacy	Chittagong	
Islamic University	Department of Pharmacy	Kushtia	
Jagannath University	Department of Pharmacy	Dhaka	
Jahangirnagar University	Department of Pharmacy	Dhaka	
Jessore University of Science and Technology	Department of Pharmacy	Jessore	
Khulna University	Pharmacy Discipline	Khulna	
Leading University	Department of Pharmacy	Sylhet	
Manarat International University	Department of Pharmacy	Dhaka	
Noakhali Science and Technology University	Department of Pharmacy	Noakhali	
North South University	Department of Pharmaceutical Sciences	Dhaka	
Northern University	Department of Pharmacy	Dhaka	
Pabna University of Science and Technology	Department of Pharmacy	Pabna	
Primeasia University	Department of Pharmacy	Dhaka	
Southeast University	Department of Pharmacy	Dhaka	
Southern University	Department of Pharmacy	Chittagong	
Stamford University	Department of Pharmacy	Dhaka	
State University of Bangladesh	School of Health Science	Dhaka	
University of Asia Pacific	Department of Pharmacy	Dhaka	
University of Chittagong	Department of Pharmacy	Chittagong	
University of Dhaka	Faculty of Pharmacy	Dhaka	
University of Development Alternative	Department of Pharmacy	Dhaka	
University of Rajshahi	Department of Pharmacy	Rajshahi	
University of Science and Technology Chittagong	Department of Pharmacy	Chittagong	
Varendra University	Department of Pharmacy	Rajshahi	

=== Belgium ===
Affiliated institution	School	Location	Ref.
Katholieke Universiteit te Leuven	Faculty of Pharmaceutical Sciences	Leuven	
UCLouvain (University of Louvain)	Faculty of Pharmacy and Biomedical Sciences	Brussels	
Vrije Universiteit Brussel	Faculty of Medicine and Pharmacy	Brussels	
Université libre de Bruxelles	Institute of Pharmacy	Brussels	
Ghent University	Laboratory of Pharmaceutical Technology	Ghent	
University of Antwerp	Department of Pharmaceutical Sciences	Antwerp	
University of Liège	Department of Pharmaceutical Sciences	Liège	
University of Mons	Faculty of Medicine and Pharmacy	Mons	

=== Bosnia and Herzegovina ===
Affiliated institution	School	Location	Ref.
University of Banja Luka	School of Pharmacy	Banja Luka	
University of Mostar	Faculty of Pharmacy	Mostar	
University of Sarajevo	Faculty of Pharmacy	Sarajevo	
University of Tuzla	Faculty of Pharmacy	Tuzla	

=== Brazil ===
Affiliated institution	School	Location	Ref.
Centro Universitário Estadual da Zona Oeste	Faculty of Pharmaceutical Sciences	Campo Grande, Rio de Janeiro	
Centro Universitário Augusto Motta	Faculty of Pharmacy	Bonsucesso, Rio de Janeiro	
Federal University of Bahia	Faculty of Pharmacy	Salvador	
Federal University of Juiz de Fora	Faculty of Pharmacy and Biochemistry	Juiz de Fora	
Federal University of Mato Grosso do Sul	Department of Pharmacy and Biochemistry	Campo Grande	
Federal University of Minas Gerais	Faculty of Pharmacy	Belo Horizonte	
Federal University of Ouro Preto	School of Pharmacy	Ouro Preto	
Federal University of Pará	Department of Pharmacy	multiple	
Federal University of Paraíba	Department of Pharmaceutical Sciences	João Pessoa	
Federal University of Paraná	Faculty of Pharmaceutical Sciences	Curitiba	
Federal University of Rio de Janeiro	Faculty of Pharmacy	Rio de Janeiro	
Federal University of Rio Grande do Sul State	School of Pharmacy	Porto Alegre	
Federal University of Santa Maria	Health Sciences Centre	Santa Maria	
Federal University of São Paulo	Institute of Environmental, Chemical and Pharmaceutical Sciences	Diadema	
Fluminense Federal University	Faculty of Pharmacy		
Lutheran University of Brazil	School of Pharmacy	multiple	
Pontifical Catholic University of Campinas	School of Pharmacy	Campinas	
Pontifical Catholic University of Parana	Faculty of Pharmacy	Curitiba	
University of Blumenau	School of Pharmacy and Biochemistry		
University of Cuiaba	Faculty of Pharmaceutical Sciences		
University of Estadual Paulista	Faculty of Pharmaceutical Sciences		
University of Estadual de Ponta Grossa	School of Pharmacy and Biochemistry		
University of Passo Fundo	Faculty of Pharmacy	Passo Fundo	
University of São Paulo	School of Pharmaceutical Sciences	São Paulo	
University of São Paulo	Ribeirão Preto School of Pharmaceutical Sciences	Ribeirão Preto	

=== Bulgaria ===
Affiliated institution	School	Location	Ref.
Medical University of Plovdiv	Faculty of Pharmacy	Plovdiv	
Medical University of Sofia	Faculty of Pharmacy	Sofia	
Medical University of Varna	Faculty of Pharmacy	Varna	
Sofia University	Faculty of Chemistry and Pharmacy	Sofia	

== C ==
=== Cambodia ===
Affiliated institution	School	Location	Ref.
University of Health Sciences	Faculty of Pharmacy	Phnom Penh	
University of Puthisastra	Department of Pharmacy	Phnom Penh	

=== Canada ===
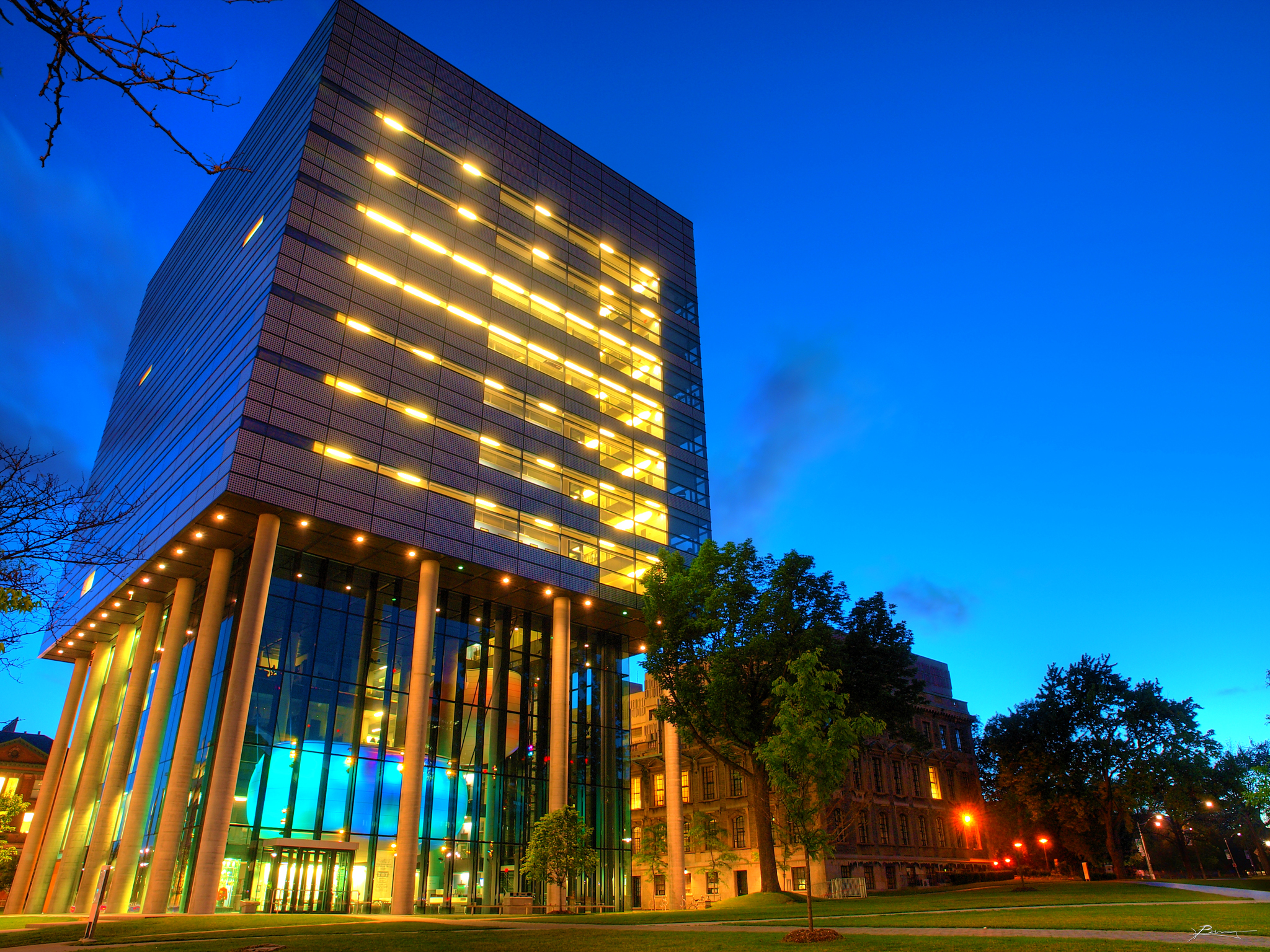
University of Toronto's Leslie Dan Faculty of Pharmacy building

Affiliated institution	School	Location	Ref.
Dalhousie University	College of Pharmacy	Halifax, Nova Scotia	
Laval University	Faculty of Pharmacy	Quebec City, Quebec	
Memorial University of Newfoundland	School of Pharmacy	St. John's, Newfoundland and Labrador	
University of Alberta	Faculty of Pharmacy & Pharmaceutical Sciences	Edmonton, Alberta	
University of British Columbia	Faculty of Pharmaceutical Sciences	Vancouver	
University of Manitoba	Faculty of Pharmacy	Winnipeg, Manitoba	
University of Montreal	Faculty of Pharmacy	Montreal	
University of Saskatchewan	College of Pharmacy and Nutrition	Saskatoon, Saskatchewan	
University of Toronto	Leslie Dan Faculty of Pharmacy	Toronto	
University of Waterloo	School of Pharmacy	Waterloo, Ontario	

=== China ===
Affiliated institution	School	Location	Ref.
China Pharmaceutical University	School of Pharmaceutical Sciences	Nanjing	
Central South University	School of Pharmaceutical Sciences	Changsha	
Fujian University of Traditional Chinese Medicine	College of Pharmacy	Fuzhou	
Guangdong College of Pharmacy	Department of Pharmacy	Guangzhou	
Guilin Medical University	College of Pharmacy	Guilin	
Guiyang Medical University	Department of Pharmacy	Guiyang	
Hebei Medical University	Department of Pharmacy	Shijiazhuang	
Inner Mongolia Medical University	Department of Pharmacy	Hohhot	
Jiamusi Medical College	Department of Pharmacy		
Jinan University	College of Pharmacy	Guangzhou	
Kaifeng Medical Specific School	Department of Pharmacy		
Lanzhou Medical College	Department of Pharmacy		
Naval Medical Specific School	Department of Pharmacy		
Second Tianjin Medical College	Department of Pharmacy		
Shandong Medical University	Department of Pharmacy		
Shanxi Medical College	Department of Pharmacy		
Shenyang College of Pharmacy			
Shenyang Pharmaceutical University			
Shihezi Medical College	Department of Pharmacy		
Sichuan University	West China School of Pharmacy	Chengdu	
Tongji Medical College	School of Pharmaceutical Sciences		
Wuhan University	College of Pharmacy		
Xian Medical University	School of Pharmaceutical Sciences		
Xinjiang Medical College	Department of Pharmacy	Ürümqi	
Yanbian Medical College	Department of Pharmacy	Yanbian	
Zhejiang University	Department of Pharmacy	Hangzhou	
Zhejiang Pharmaceutical College	Department of Pharmacy	Ningbo	

==== Beijing ====
Affiliated institution	School	Location	Ref.
Peking University Health Science Center	School of Pharmaceutical Sciences	Beijing	

==== Hong Kong ====
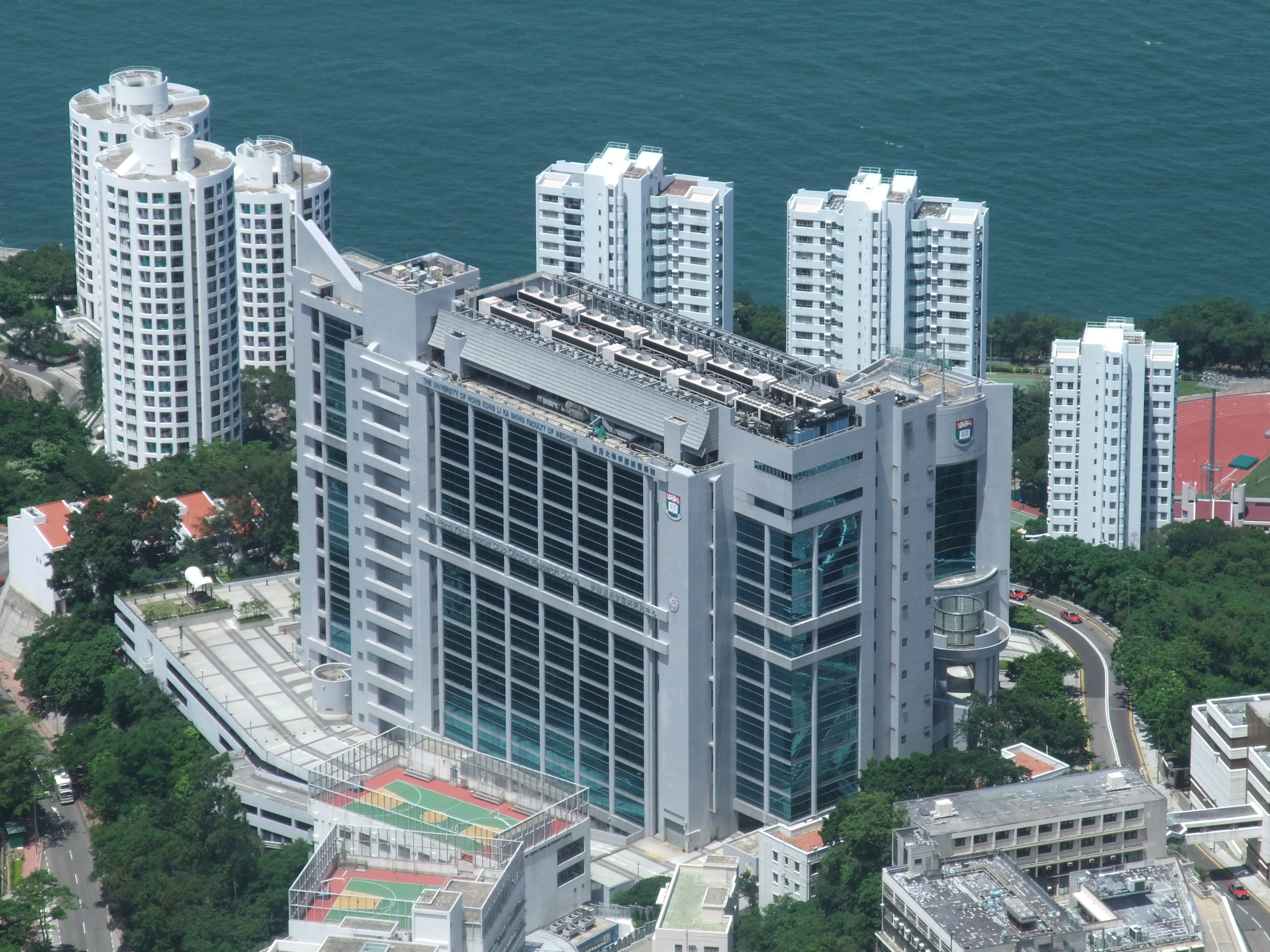
Li La Shing Faculty of Medicine, University of Hong Kong

Affiliated institution	School	Location	Ref.
Chinese University of Hong Kong	School of Pharmacy	Sha Tin	
University of Hong Kong	Li Ka Shing Faculty of Medicine	Pok Fu Lam	

==== Jiangsu ====
Affiliated institution	School	Location	Ref.
	China Pharmaceutical University	Nanjing	

==== Macau ====
Affiliated institution	School	Location	Ref.
Macao Polytechnic University	Faculty of Health Sciences and Sports	Sé	

==== Shanghai ====
Affiliated institution	School	Location	Ref.
Second Military Medical University	Department of Pharmacy	Shanghai	
Shanghai Jiao Tong University	School of Pharmacy	Shanghai	
Shanghai Medical College of Fudan University	School of Pharmacy	Shanghai	

=== Chile ===
Affiliated institution	School	Location	Ref.
Arturo Prat University	Faculty of Health Sciences	Iquique	
Catholic University of the North	School of Pharmacy	Antofagasta	
Pontifical Catholic University of Chile	Department of Pharmacy	Santiago	
University of Chile	Faculty of Chemical and Pharmaceutical Sciences	Santiago	
University of Concepción	Faculty of Pharmacy	Concepción	
University of Valparaíso	Faculty of Pharmacy	Valparaíso	

=== Colombia ===
Affiliated institution	School	Location	Ref.
ICESI University	Department of Chemical Sciences	Cali	
National University of Colombia	Department of Pharmacy	Bogotá	
University of Antioquia	Faculty of Pharmaceutical Chemistry	Medellín	
University of Applied and Environmental Sciences	Department of Pharmaceutical Chemistry	Bogotá	
University of Atlántico	Faculty of Chemistry and Pharmacy	Barranquilla	
University of Cartagena	Faculty of Pharmaceutical Sciences	Cartagena	

=== Costa Rica ===
Affiliated institution	School	Location	Ref.
Medical Sciences University		San José	
University of Costa Rica	Faculty of Pharmacy	San Pedro	
University of Iberoamerica		San José	

=== Czech Republic ===
Affiliated institution	School	Location	Ref.
Charles University	Faculty of Pharmacy	Hradec Králové	
Masaryk University, Brno	Faculty of Pharmacy	Brno	

== D ==
=== Democratic Republic of Congo ===
Affiliated institution	School	Location	Ref.
University of Kinshasa	Faculty of Pharmacy	Kinshasa	
University of Lubumbashi	Faculty of Pharmacy	Lubumbashi	

=== Denmark ===
Affiliated institution	School	Location	Ref.
Pharmakon	Danish College of Pharmacy Practice	Hillerød	
University of Copenhagen	School of Pharmaceutical Sciences	Copenhagen	
University of Southern Denmark	Department of Physics, Chemistry and Pharmacy	Odense	

=== Dominican Republic ===
Affiliated institution	School	Location	Ref.
Eastern Central University	School of Pharmacy	San Pedro de Macorís	
Pedro Henriquez Ureña Nacinal University	School of Pharmacy	Santo Domingo	

== E ==
=== Egypt ===
Affiliated institution	School	Location	Ref.
Heliopolis University for Sustainable Development	Faculty of Pharmacy	Cairo	
Ahram Canadian University	Faculty of Pharmacy	6th of October City	
Ain Shams University	Faculty of Pharmacy	Cairo	
Al-Azhar University	Faculty of Pharmacy	Cairo	
Alexandria University	Faculty of Pharmacy	Alexandria	
Arab Academy for science and Technology and Maritime transport	Faculty of Pharmacy	Alexandria	
Assiut University	Faculty of Pharmacy	Asyut	
Beni-Suef University	Faculty of Pharmacy	Beni Suef	
British University in Egypt	Faculty of Pharmacy	Al Shorouk	
Cairo University	Faculty of Pharmacy	Giza	
Delta University for Science and Technology	Faculty of Pharmacy	Mansoura	
Egyptian Russian University	Faculty of Pharmacy	Cairo	
Future University in Egypt	Faculty of Pharmaceutical Sciences & Pharmaceutical Industries	New Cairo	
German University in Cairo	Faculty of Pharmacy and Biotechnology	New Cairo	
Helwan University	Faculty of Pharmacy	Helwan	
Kafrelsheikh University	Faculty of Pharmacy & Pharmaceutical Industries	Kafr el-Sheikh	
Mansoura University	Faculty of Pharmacy	Mansoura	
Minia University	Faculty of Pharmacy	Minya	
Misr International University	School of Pharmacy	Cairo	
Misr University for Science and Technology	Faculty of Pharmacy and Drug Manufacturing	6th of October City	
Modern Sciences and Arts University	Faculty of Pharmacy	Cairo	
Modern University for technology and information	Faculty of Pharmacy	Cairo	
Nahda University	Faculty of Pharmacy	Beni Suef	
October 6 University	Faculty of Pharmacy	6th of October City	
Pharos University in Alexandria	Faculty of Pharmacy and Drug Manufacturing	Alexandria	
Sinai University	Faculty of Pharmacy	Arish	
Suez Canal University	Faculty of Pharmacy	Ismaïlia	
Tanta University	Faculty of Pharmacy	Tanta	
Zagazig University	Faculty of Pharmacy	Zagazig	

=== Estonia ===
Affiliated institution	School	Location	Ref.
University of Tartu	Department of Pharmacy	Tartu	

=== Ethiopia ===
Affiliated institution	School	Location	Ref.
Addis Ababa University	School of Pharmacy	Addis Ababa	
Wollega University	Department of Pharmacy	Nekemte	
Wachemo University	Department of Pharmacy	Hossana	
University of Gondar	School of Pharmacy	Gondar	

== F ==
=== Fiji ===
Affiliated institution	School	Location	Ref.
Fiji School of Medicine	Department of Pharmacy and Therapeutics	Suva	

=== Finland ===
Affiliated institution	School	Location	Ref.
Åbo Akademi University	Department of Biochemistry and Pharmacy	Turku	
University of Eastern Finland	Faculty of Pharmacy	multiple	
University of Helsinki	Faculty of Pharmacy	Helsinki	

=== France ===
Location	Affiliated institution	School.
Amiens	University of Picardie Jules Verne	UFR de pharmacie
Angers	University of Angers	Faculté de Santé
Besançon	University of Franche-Comté	Faculté de médecine et de pharmacie
Bordeaux	University of Bordeaux	UFR Sciences pharmaceutiques
Caen	University of Caen Normandy	UFR Santé
Châtenay-Malabry	University of Paris-Sud (a.k.a. Paris XI, Paris-Saclay)	Faculté de pharmacie
Clermont-Ferrand	University of Clermont Auvergne	UFR de pharmacie
Dijon	University of Burgundy	UFR sciences de santé
Grenoble	Université Grenoble Alpes	Faculté de pharmacie
Lille	Lille 2 University of Health and Law	Faculté de pharmacie
Limoges	University of Limoges	Faculté de pharmacie
Lyon	Claude Bernard University Lyon 1	Faculté de pharmacie de Lyon
Marseille	Aix-Marseille University	Faculté de pharmacie
Montpellier	University of Montpellier	Faculté de pharmacie
Nancy	University of Lorraine	Faculté de pharmacie
Nantes	University of Nantes	UFR des Sciences Pharmaceutiques et Biologiques
Paris	Paris Descartes University (aka Paris V, or University of Paris (2019))	Faculté de pharmacie de Paris
Poitiers	University of Poitiers	Faculté de médecine et de pharmacie
Reims	University of Reims Champagne-Ardenne	UFR de pharmacie
Rennes	University of Rennes 1	Faculté des Sciences pharmaceutiques et biologiques
Rouen	University of Rouen	UFR santé
Strasbourg	University of Strasbourg	Faculté de pharmacie
Toulouse	Paul Sabatier University	Faculté de pharmacie de Toulouse
Tours	University of Tours	Faculté de pharmacie de Tours

== G ==
=== Georgia ===
Affiliated institution	School	Location	Ref.
University of Tsodna	Faculty of Pharmacy	Tbilisi	

=== Germany ===
Affiliated institution	School	Location	Ref.
TU Braunschweig	Institute of Pharmaceutical Technology	Braunschweig	
Free University of Berlin	Faculty of Pharmacy	Berlin	
Goethe University Frankfurt	Department of Pharmacy	Frankfurt	
Heidelberg University	Faculty of Pharmacy	Heidelberg	
Leipzig University	Institute of Pharmacy	Leipzig	
LMU Munich	Institute of Pharmacy	Munich	
Saarland University	Faculty of Pharmacy	Saarbrücken	
University of Bonn	Faculty of Pharmacy	Bonn	
Heinrich Heine University Düsseldorf	Faculty of Pharmacy	Düsseldorf	
University of Erlangen–Nuremberg	Institute of Pharmacy and Food Chemistry	Erlangen, Nuremberg	
University of Freiburg	Faculty of Chemistry and Pharmacy	Freiburg im Breisgau	
University of Greifswald	Institute of Pharmacy	Greifswald	
Martin Luther University Halle-Wittenberg	College of Pharmacy	Halle	
University of Hamburg	Pharmacy Institute	Hamburg	
University of Jena	Faculty of Pharmacy	Jena	
Kiel University	Institute of Pharmacy	Kiel	
University of Mainz	Institute of Pharmacy	Mainz	
Marburg University	Department of Pharmacy	Marburg	
University of Münster	Faculty of Chemistry and Pharmacy	Münster	
University of Regensburg	Institute of Pharmacy	Regensburg	
University of Tübingen	Institute of Pharmacy	Tübingen	
University of Würzburg	Institute of Pharmacy	Würzburg	

=== Ghana ===
Affiliated institution	School	Location	Ref.
Kwame Nkrumah University of Science and Technology	Faculty of Pharmacy and Pharmaceutical Sciences	Kumasi	
University of Development Studies	Department of Pharmacy	Tamale	
University of Ghana	School of Pharmacy	Legon	
University of Health and Allied Sciences	School of Pharmacy	Ho	
Central University	School of Pharmacy	Miotso	
Entrance University College of Health	School of Pharmacy	Accra	

=== Greece ===
Affiliated institution	School	Location	Ref.
Aristotle University of Thessaloniki	Department of Pharmacy	Thessaloniki	
University of Athens	Department of Pharmacy	Athens	
University of Patras	Department of Pharmacy	Patras	

=== Guyana ===
==== Affiliated institution ====	==== School ====	==== Location ====	===== Ref =====
Texila American University	School of Allied Health Sciences	Georgetown	

=== Hungary ===
Affiliated institution	School	Location	Ref.
Semmelweis University	Faculty of Pharmacy	Budapest	
University of Debrecen	Medical and Health Science Center	Debrecen	
University of Pécs	Faculty of Pharmacy	Pécs	
University of Szeged	Faculty of Pharmacy	Szeged	

== I ==
=== Iceland ===
Affiliated institution	School	Location	Ref.
University of Iceland	Faculty of Pharmacy	Reykjavík	

=== India ===
==== Andhra Pradesh ====
Affiliated institution	School	Location	Ref.
Andhra University	Andhra University College of Pharmaceutical Sciences	Visakhapatnam	
Teerthanker Mahaveer University	Teerthanker Mahaveer College of Pharmacy	Moradabad	
Andhra University	Sir CR Reddy College of Pharmaceutical Sciences	Eluru	
Andhra University	Raghu College of Pharmacy		
Andhra University	Shri Vishnu College of Pharmacy	Bhimavaram	
Andhra University	Yalamarty College of Pharmacy		
	Avanthi College of Pharmacy		
	Geethanjali College of Pharmacy	Cheeriyal	
	GIET School of Pharmacy	Rajahmundry	
GITAM University	Gitam Institute of Pharmacy	Visakhapatnam	
	Gokaraju Rangaraju College of Pharmacy	Hyderabad	
	Gurunanak Institute of Pharmacy	Hyderabad	
Jawaharlal Nehru Technological University	Anwarul Uloom College of Pharmacy	Hyderabad	
Jawaharlal Nehru Technological University	Bharat Institute of Pharmacy	Ibrahimpatnam	
Jawaharlal Nehru Technological University	Nalanda College of Pharmacy	Nalgonda	
Jawaharlal Nehru Technological University	QIS College of Pharmacy	Ongole	
Jawaharlal Nehru Technological University	Raghavendra Institute of Pharmaceutical Education & Research		
Jawaharlal Nehru Technological University	Samskruti College of Pharmacy	Ghatkesar	
Jawaharlal Nehru Technological University	St. Mary's College of Pharmacy	Secunderabad	
Jawaharlal Nehru Technological University	Sri Indu Institute of Pharmacy		
Jawaharlal Nehru Technological University	Vignan College of Pharmacy	Duvvada	
Kakatiya University	University College of Pharmaceutical Sciences	Warangal	
	Maharaja College of Pharmacy		
Jawaharlal Nehru Technological University	MAK College of Pharmacy	Telangana	
Osmania University	G.Pulla Reddy College of Pharmacy	Hyderabad	
Osmania University	Malla Reddy College of Pharmacy		
Osmania University	M.N.R College of Pharmacy	Sangareddy	
Osmania University	Mother Theresa College of Pharmacy	Hyderabad	
Osmania University	Priyadarshini College of Pharmaceutical Sciences		
Osmania University	Sri Venkateswara College of Pharmacy	Hyderabad	
Sarada College of Pharmaceutical Sciences	Guntur		
	Shadan College of Pharmacy	Hyderabad	
	SLC's College of Pharmacy	Hyderabad	
Srikrishnadevaraya University	College of Pharmacy		

==== Chhattisgarh ====
Affiliated institution	School	Location	Ref.
Guru Ghasidas Vishwavidyalaya	Department of Pharmacy	Bilaspur	
Chouksey Engineering College	School of Pharmacy	Bilaspur	
Ravatpura Sarkar	Institute of Pharmaceutical Sciences	Durg	
Pandit Ravishankar Shukla University	Institute of Pharmacy	Raipur	
Swami Vivekananda Technical University	Royal College of Pharmacy	Raipur	

==== Dadra and Nagar Haveli ====
Affiliated institution	School	Location	Ref.
Savitribai Phule Pune University	SSR College of Pharmacy	Silvassa	

==== Delhi ====
Affiliated institution	School	Location	Ref.
	Delhi Institute of Pharmaceutical Sciences and Research	Pushp Vihar	
Jamia Hamdard	Faculty of Pharmacy	New Delhi	
	Maharaja Surajmal Institute of Pharmacy		
University of Delhi		New Delhi	

==== Gujarat ====
Affiliated institution	School	Location	Ref.
	Indukaka Ipcowala College of Pharmacy	Vallabh Vidyanagar	
Ganpat University	Shree S. K. Patel College of Pharmaceutical Education & Research	Kherva	
	K.B. Institute of Pharmaceutical Education and Research	Gandhinagar	
National Institute of Pharmaceutical Education and Research		Thaltej	

==== Haryana ====
Affiliated institution	School	Location	Ref.
Guru Jambheshwar University of Science and Technology	Department of Pharmaceutical Sciences	Hisar	
	Hindu College Of Pharmacy	Sonipat	
Maharishi Dayanand University	Faculty of Pharmaceutical Sciences	Rohtak	
Pt. B.D. Sharma PGIMS Rohtak	Department of Pharmacology	Rohtak	
	R.K.College of Pharmacy	Rajkot	
Kurukshetra University	Institute of Pharmaceutical Sciences	Kurukshetra	

==== Jammu and Kashmir ====
Affiliated institution	School	Location	Ref.
University of Kashmir	Department of Pharmaceutical Sciences	Srinagar	

==== Karnataka ====
Affiliated institution	School	Location	Ref.
	Acharya and B M Reddy College of Pharmacy	Bangalore	
	Oxbridge College of Pharmacy	Bangalore	
	Al-Ameen College of Pharmacy	Bangalore	
	Gautham Institute of Pharmacy	Bangalore	
	Government College of Pharmacy	Bangalore	
	Hillside College of Pharmacy and Research Centre	Bangalore	
	The Oxford College of Pharmacy	Bangalore	
	JSS College of Pharmacy	Mysore	
	K.L.E College of Pharmacy	Belgaum, Hubli, Bangalore	
	Karnataka College of Pharmacy	Bidar	
	Luqman College of Pharmacy	Gulbarga	
	M.M.U.College of Pharmacy	Ramanagar	
Manipal University	College of Pharmaceutical Sciences	Manipal	
	National College of Pharmacy	Shimoga	
	Nitte Gulabi Shetty Memorial Institute of Pharmaceutical Sciences	Paneer, Mangalore	
	PES College of Pharmacy	Bangalore	
	Ssree Sdevi College of Pharmacy	Mangalore	

==== Kerala ====
Affiliated institution	School	Location	Ref.
	Academy of Pharmaceutical Sciences, Pariyaram	Kannur district	
Amrita Vishwa Vidyapeetham University	Amrita School of Pharmacy	Cochin	
Calicut Medical College	College of Pharmaceutical Science	Kozhikode	
	College of Pharmaceutical Sciences	Kottayam	
	Devaki Amma Memorial College Of Pharmacy	Kozhikode	

==== Madhya Pradesh ====
Affiliated institution	School	Location	Ref.
	Bansal College of Pharmacy	Bhopal	
	Bhagyoday Tirth Pharmacy College	Sagar	
Dr. Hari Singh Gour University	Department of Pharmaceutical Sciences		
	Millennium College of Pharmacy	Bhopal	
Rajiv Gandhi Technical University	School of Pharmaceutical Sciences	Bhopal	
Shri Govindram Seksaria Institute of Technology and Science	Department of Pharmacy	Indore	
	RKDF College of Pharmacy	Bhopal	
	Sagar Institute of Pharmaceutical Sciences	Sagar	
Vikram University	Institute of Pharmacy		
	VNS College of Pharmacy	Bhopal	

==== Maharashtra ====
Affiliated institution	School	Location	Ref.
	Dr. Bhanuben Nanavati College of Pharmacy	Mumbai	
	Gahlot Institute of Pharmacy	Kopar Khairane	
	Government College of Pharmacy	Karad	
	H.R.Patel Institute of Pharmaceutical Education & Research	Shirpur	
	Jayawantrao Sawant College of Pharmacy and Research	Hadapsar, Pune	
Maharashtra University of Health Sciences	Pravara Rural College of Pharmacy		
	NDMVP College of Pharmacy	Nashik	
	Poona College of Pharmacy		
	Prin K.M Kundnani College of Pharmacy	Mumbai	
Rashtrasant Tukadoji Maharaj Nagpur University	Department of Pharmaceutical Sciences	Nagpur	
	Smt. Kishoritai Bhoyar College of Pharmacy	New Kamptee, Nagpur	
Savitribai Phule Pune University	College of Pharmacy, Pune	Narhe	
Savitribai Phule Pune University	AISSMS College of Pharmacy	Pune	
Sinhgad Technical Education Society			
	NCRD'S Sterling Institute of Pharmacy	Nerul East, Navi Mumbai, Maharashtra	
Institute of Chemical Technology		Mumbai	

=== Odisha ===
Affiliated institution	School	Location	Ref.
Utkal University, Odisha	University Department of Pharmaceutical Sciences	Bhubaneswar, Odisha	https://utkaluniversity.nic.in/pharmacy

==== Punjab ====
Affiliated institution	School	Location	Ref.
	National Institute of Pharmaceutical Education & Research	Mohali	
Panjab University, Chandigarh	Institute of Pharmaceutical Sciences	Chandigarh	
Punjabi University	Department of Pharmaceutical Sciences & Drug Research	Patiala	
Sri Sai University	Sri Sai College of Pharmacy	Pathankot	
Sri Sai University	Sai Institute of Pharmaceutical Education & Research	Amritsar	

==== Rajasthan ====
Affiliated institution	School	Location	Ref.
Birla Institute of Technology and Science	Department of Pharmacy	Pilani	
Central University of Rajasthan	Department of Pharmacy	Ajmer	
Rajasthan University of Health Sciences	Regional College of Pharmacy	Jaipur	
University of Technology	Department of Pharmacy	Jaipur	

==== Sikkim ====
Affiliated institution	School	Location	Ref.
Sikkim University	Himalayan Pharmacy Institute	Gangtok	

==== Tamil Nadu ====
Affiliated institution	School	Location	Ref.
Anna University Chennai	Department of Pharmaceutical Technology	Tiruchirappalli	
Annamalai University	Department of Pharmacy	Annamalai Nagar	
Dr. M.G.R. Medical University		Chennai	
	J.S.S. College of Pharmacy	Ooty	
	KMCH College of Pharmacy	Coimbatore	
	K.M.R. College of Pharmacy	Perundurai	
	Madras College of Pharmacy		
	Periyar College of Pharmaceutical Sciences	Tiruchirappalli	
	PSG college of Pharmacy	Coimbatore	
Sri Ramakrishna Institute of Paramedical Sciences	College of Pharmacy	Coimbatore	
SRM university	SRM College of Pharmacy		

==== Telangana ====
Affiliated institution	School	Location	Ref.
CDC University	Hanamkonda		
Jawaharlal Nehru Technological University	CVM College of Pharmacy	Karimnagar	
Jawaharlal Nehru Technological University	SVS School of Pharmacy	Hanamakonda	
	St.Peters Institute of Pharmaceutical Sciences	Hanamakonda	
	Vaagdevi College of Pharmacy	Hanamakonda	
Jawaharlal Nehru Technological University	Moonray Institute of Pharmaceutical Sciences	Shadnagar	
Jawaharlal Nehru Technological University	Bhaskar Pharmacy College		

==== Uttar Pradesh ====
Affiliated institution	School	Location	Ref.
Barhmanand Group of Institutions	Centre for Pharmacy	Bulandshahr	
Indian Institute of Technology, BHU	Department of Pharmaceutics	Varanasi	
Muzaffarpur Institute of Technology	Department of Pharmacy	Muzaffarpur	
shri venkateshwara university	COLLEGE OF PHARMACY	Gajraula	[34]
Sam Higginbottom Institute of Agriculture, Technology and Sciences	Christian School of Pharmacy	Allahabad	
Shri Ram Murti Smarak College of Engineering & Technology		Bareilly	
Chhatrapati Shahu Ji Maharaj University	Institute of Pharmacy	Kanpur	
Uttar Pradesh University of Medical Sciences	Faculty of Pharmacy	Saifai, Etawah district	

==== Uttarakhand ====
Affiliated institution	School	Location	Ref.
Gurukula Kangri Vishwavidyalaya	Department of Pharmaceutical Sciences	Haridwar	
Siddhartha Institute of Pharmacy, Dehradun			
	Gyani Inder Singh Institute of Professional Studies	Dehradun	
Hemwati Nandan Bahuguna Garhwal University	Department of Pharmaceutical Chemistry	Srinagar	
Kumaun University	Pharmacy Department	Nainital	

==== West Bengal ====
Affiliated institution	School	Location	Ref.
The West Bengal University of Health Sciences	Haldia Institute of Pharmacy	Haldia	
The West Bengal University of Health Sciences	Institute of Pharmacy, Jalpaiguri	Jalpaiguri	
Jadavpur University	Department of Pharmaceutical Technology	Kolkata	
Brainware University	Department of Pharmaceutical Technology	Kolkata	
West Bengal University of Technology	B.C.D.A. College of Pharmacy & Technology	Kolkata	
West Bengal University of Technology	Bengal School of Technology	Hooghly	
West Bengal University of Technology	Bharat Technology	Howrah	
West Bengal University of Technology	Calcutta Institute of Pharmaceutical Technology & Allied Health Sciences	Howrah	
West Bengal University of Technology	Dr.B.C.Roy College of Pharmacy and Allied Health Sciences	Durgapur	
West Bengal University of Technology	Gupta College of Technological Science	Asansol	
West Bengal University of Technology	Gurunanak Institute of Pharmaceutical Science & Technology	Kolkata	
West Bengal University of Technology	Netaji Subhash Chandra Bose Institute of Pharmacy	Nadia	
West Bengal University of Technology	NSHM Knowledge Campus	Kolkata	

=== Indonesia ===
Affiliated institution	School	Location	Ref.
Ahmad Dahlan University	Faculty of Pharmacy	Yogyakarta	
Andalas University	Faculty of Pharmacy	Padang	
Gadjah Mada University	Faculty of Pharmacy	Yogyakarta	
Hasanuddin University	Faculty of Pharmacy	Makassar	
Bandung Institute of Technology	School of Pharmacy	Bandung	
Muhammadiyah University of Surakarta	Faculty of Pharmacy	Surakarta	
Muhammadiyah University of Yogyakarta	School of Pharmacy	Yogyakarta	
Padjadjaran University	Faculty of Pharmacy	Bandung	
Pancasila University	Faculty of Pharmacy		
Sanata Dharma University	Faculty of Pharmacy	Yogyakarta	
Syarif Hidayatullah State Islamic University Jakarta	Department of Pharmacy	Ciputat	
Udayana University	Department of Pharmacy	Denpasar	
University of Airlangga	Faculty of Pharmacy	Surabaya	
University of Anna White	School of Pharmacy		
University of Indonesia	Faculty of Pharmacy	Depok	
University of Jenderal Soedirman	Faculty of Pharmacy		
University of Surabaya	Faculty of Pharmacy	Surabaya	
University of Sumatera Utara	Faculty of Pharmacy		
Widya Mandala Catholic University Surabaya	Faculty of Pharmacy		

=== Iran ===
Affiliated institution	School	Location	Ref.
Ahvaz Jundishapur University of Medical Sciences	Faculty of Pharmacy	Ahvaz	
Hormozgan University of Medical Sciences	Faculty of Pharmacy	Bandar Abbas	
Gilan University of Medical Sciences	School of Pharmacy	Gilan	
Isfahan University of Medical Sciences	School of Pharmacy	Isfahan	
Islamic Azad University	Faculty of Pharmacy	multiple	
Kerman University of Medical Sciences	School of Pharmacy	Kerman	
Kermanshah University of Medical Sciences	School of Pharmacy	Kermanshah	
Mashhad University of Medical Sciences	School of Pharmacy	Mashhad	
Mazandaran University of Medical Sciences	School of Pharmacy	Sari	
Shahid Beheshti University of Medical Sciences	School of Pharmacy	Tehran	
Shiraz University of Medical Sciences	School of Pharmacy	Shiraz	
Tabriz University of Medical Sciences	Faculty of Pharmacy	Tabriz	
Tehran University of Medical Sciences	Faculty of Pharmacy	Tehran	
Zabol Medical Science University	School of Pharmacy	Zabol	
Urmia University of Medical Sciences	Faculty of Pharmacy	Urmia	
Zanjan University of Medical Sciences	School of Pharmacy	Zanjan	
Alborz University of Medical Sciences	School of Pharmacy	Alborz	

=== Iraq ===
Affiliated institution	School	Location	Ref.
American University of Iraq - Baghdad	College of Pharmacy	Baghdad	
Al-Mustansiriya University	Faculty of Pharmacy	Baghdad	
Al Yarmouk University College	Al-yarmook College of Pharmacy	Baghdad	
Baghdad Pharmacy College	Department of Pharmacy	Baghdad	
Hawler Medical University	Faculty of Pharmacy	Erbil	
Salahaddin University	Faculty of Pharmacy	Erbil	
University of Anbar	Faculty of Pharmacy	Ramadi	
University of Babylon	Faculty of Pharmacy	Hillah	
University of Baghdad	Faculty of Pharmacy	Baghdad	
University of Basrah	Faculty of Pharmacy	Basra	
University of Duhok	Faculty of Pharmacy	Duhok	
University of Karbala	Faculty of Pharmacy	Karbala	
University of Kufa	Faculty of Pharmacy	Najaf	
University of Mosul	Faculty of Pharmacy	Mosul	
University of Sulaymaniyah	Faculty of Pharmacy	Sulaymaniyah	
University of Tikrit	Faculty of Pharmacy	Tikrit	
Uruk University	College of Pharmacy	Baghdad	

=== Ireland ===
Affiliated institution	School	Location	Ref.
Trinity College Dublin	School of Pharmacy and Pharmaceutical Sciences	Dublin	
Royal College of Surgeons in Ireland	School of Pharmacy and Biomolecular Sciences	Dublin	
University College Cork	School of Pharmacy	Cork	
University of Galway	School of Pharmacy and Medical Sciences	Galway	
Atlantic Technological University	Department of Pharmacy & Pharmaceutical Sciences	Sligo	
South East Technological University	Department of Pharmacy	Waterford	

=== Israel ===
Affiliated institution	School	Location	Ref.
Ben-Gurion University of the Negev	School of Pharmacy	Beersheba	
Hebrew University of Jerusalem	School of Pharmacy	Jerusalem, Rehovot	

=== Italy ===
Affiliated institution	School	Location	Ref.
Magna Græcia University	Faculty of Pharmacy	Catanzaro	
Sapienza University of Rome	Faculty of Pharmacy	Rome	
University of Bari	Faculty of Pharmacy	Bari	
University of Bologna	Faculty of Pharmacy	Bologna	
University of Cagliari	Faculty of Pharmacy	Cagliari	
University of Camerino	Faculty of Pharmacy	Camerino	
University of Catania	Faculty of Pharmacy	Catania	
D'Annunzio University of Chieti–Pescara	Faculty of Pharmacy	Chieti	
University of Ferrara	Department of Pharmaceutical Sciences	Ferrara	
University of Florence	Faculty of Pharmacy	Florence	
University of Genoa	Faculty of Pharmacy	Liguria	
University of Messina	Faculty of Pharmacy	Messina	
University of Milan	Faculty of Pharmacy	Milan	
University of Modena and Reggio Emilia	Faculty of Pharmacy	Modena, Reggio Emilia	
University of Naples Federico II	Faculty of Pharmacy	Naples	
University of Padua	Faculty of Pharmacy	Padua	
University of Palermo	Faculty of Pharmacy	Palermo	
University of Parma	Faculty of Pharmacy	Parma	
University of Pavia	Faculty of Pharmacy	Pavia	
University of Perugia	Faculty of Pharmacy	Perugia	
University of Pisa	Faculty of Pharmacy	Pisa	
University of Salerno	Faculty of Pharmacy	Salerno	
University of Sassari	Faculty of Pharmacy	Sassari	
University of Siena	Faculty of Pharmacy	Siena	
University of Trieste	Faculty of Pharmacy	Trieste	
University of Turin	Faculty of Pharmacy	Turin	
University of Urbino	Faculty of Pharmacy	Urbino	

== J ==
=== Jamaica ===
Affiliated institution	School	Location	Ref.
University of Technology	School of Pharmacy and Health Science	Kingston	
University of the West Indies	School of Pharmacy	Mona	

=== Japan ===
Affiliated institution	School	Location	Ref.
Chiba University	Faculty of Pharmaceutical Science	Chiba	
	Gifu Pharmaceutical University	Gifu	
Fukuyama University	Faculty of Pharmacy and Pharmeutical Sciences	Fukuyama	
Hiroshima University	Institute of Pharmaceutical Sciences	Higashihiroshima, Hiroshima	
Hokkaido University	Faculty of Pharmaceutical Sciences	Sapporo	
Hokuriku University	Faculty of Pharmaceutical Sciences	Kanazawa	
Hoshi University	School of Pharmaceutical Sciences	Shinagawa	
Josai University	School of Pharmaceutical Sciences	Sakado	
Kanazawa University	Faculty of Pharmaceutical Sciences	Kanazawa	
Kumamoto University	Faculty of Pharmaceutical Sciences	Kumamoto	
Kitasato University	School of Pharmaceutical Sciences	Minato	
Kyoto University	Graduate School of Pharmaceutical Sciences	Kyoto	
Kyushu University	Faculty of Pharmaceutical Sciences	Fukuoka	
	Meiji Pharmaceutical University	Kiyose	
	Niigata University of Pharmacy and Applied Life Sciences	Nigata	
Okayama University	Faculty of Pharmaceutical Sciences	Okayama	
Osaka University	Faculty and Graduate School of Pharmaceutical Sciences	Osaka	
Showa University	School of Pharmacy	Tokyo	
	Showa Pharmaceutical University	Machida	
Teikyo University	School of Pharmaceutical Sciences	Itabashi	
Tohoku University	Graduate School of Pharmaceutical Sciences	Sendai	
Tokushima Bunri University	Faculty of Pharmaceutical Sciences	Tokushima	
Tokyo University of Pharmacy and Life Sciences		Hachiōji	
Tokyo University	Faculty of Pharmaceutical Sciences	Bunkyō	
University of Shizuoka	School of Pharmaceutical Sciences	Shizuoka	
University of Toyama	Department of Hospital Pharmacy	Toyama	

=== Jordan ===
Affiliated institution	School	Location	Ref.
American University of Madaba	Department of Pharmacy	Madaba	
Al-Ahliyya Amman University		Amman	
Al-Isra University	Faculty of Pharmacy	Amman	
Al-Zaytoonah University of Jordan	Faculty of Pharmacy	Amman	
Jordan University of Science and Technology	Faculty of Pharmacy	Ar Ramtha	
Petra University	Faculty of Pharmacy	Amman	
Philadelphia University	Faculty of Pharmacy	Amman	
University of Jordan	Faculty of Pharmacy	Amman	
Zarqa University	Faculty of Pharmacy	Zarqa	

== K ==
=== Kenya ===
Affiliated institution	School	Location	Ref.
Kenyatta University	School of Pharmacy	Nairobi	
University of Nairobi	School of Pharmacy	Nairobi	
Jomo Kenyatta University of Agriculture and Technology	School of Pharmacy	Kiambu	
Mount Kenya University	School of Pharmacy	Kiambu	
USIU Africa	School of pharmacy	Nairobi	
Kabarak University	School of Pharmacy	Nakuru	
Maseno University	School of Pharmacy	Kisumu	
Kenya Methodist University	Department of Pharmacy	Meru	
Kisii University	Department of Pharmacy	Kisii	

=== Kuwait ===
Affiliated institution	School	Location	Ref.
Kuwait University	Faculty of Pharmacy	Kuwait City	

== L ==
=== Latvia ===
Affiliated institution	School	Location	Ref.
Riga Stradiņš University	Faculty of Pharmacy	Riga	
University of Latvia	Faculty of Pharmacy	Riga	

=== Lebanon ===
Affiliated institution	School	Location	Ref.
Beirut Arab University	Faculty of Pharmacy	Beirut	
Lebanese American University	School of Pharmacy	Byblos, Beirut	
Lebanese International University	Faculty of Pharmacy	Beqaa Valley	
Lebanese University	Faculty of Pharmacy	Beirut	
Saint Joseph University	Faculty of Pharmacy	Beirut	

=== Libya ===
Affiliated institution	School	Location	Ref.
Elmergib University	Faculty of Pharmacy	Alkhoms	
University of Tripoli	Faculty of Pharmacy	Tripoli	
University of Benghazi	Faculty of Pharmacy	Benghazi	
University of Zawia	Faculty of Pharmacy	Alzawia	
University of Misurata	Faculty of Pharmacy	Misurata	
Omar Al-Mukhtar University	Faculty of Pharmacy	Al-bayda	
Al-Assmaria University	Faculty of Pharmacy	Zliten	
Sebha University	Faculty of Pharmacy	Sebha	

=== Lithuania ===
Affiliated institution	School	Location	Ref.
Lithuanian University of Health Sciences	Faculty of Pharmacy	Kaunas	

== M ==
=== Malaysia ===
Affiliated institution	School	Location	Ref.
AIMST University	Faculty of Pharmacy	Semeling	
Cyberjaya University College of Medical Sciences	Faculty of Pharmacy	Cyberjaya	
International Islamic University Malaysia	Kulliyyah of Pharmacy	Gambang	
International Medical University	Faculty of Pharmacy & Health Sciences	Kuala Lumpur	
MAHSA University	Faculty of Pharmacy	Kuala Lumpur	
Management and Science University	School of Pharmacy	Shah Alam	
MARA University of Technology	Faculty of Pharmacy	Puncak Alam	
Masterskill University College		Cheras	
Monash University Malaysia Campus	School of Pharmacy	Bandar Sunway	
National University of Malaysia	Faculty of Pharmacy	Bangi	
University of Nottingham Malaysia Campus	School of Pharmacy	Semenyih	
SEGi University	Faculty of Pharmacy & Health Sciences	Kota Damansara	
Taylor's University	Faculty of Pharmacy	Subang Jaya	
UCSI University	Faculty of Pharmaceutical Sciences	multiple	
University of Kuala Lumpur	Royal College of Medicine Perak	Kuala Lumpur	
University of Malaya	Department of Pharmacy, Faculty of Medicine	Kuala Lumpur	
University of Science, Malaysia	School of Pharmaceutical Sciences	Pulau Pinang	

=== Malta ===
Affiliated institution	School	Location	Ref.
University of Malta	Department of Pharmacy	Msida	

=== Mexico ===
Affiliated institution	School	Location	Ref.
Autonomous University of Nuevo León	Faculty of Chemical Sciences	Nuevo León	
Meritorious Autonomous University of Puebla	Faculty of Chemical Sciences	Puebla	
National Autonomous University of Mexico	Chemistry Faculty	Mexico City	
University of Guanajuato	School of Pharmacy	Guanajuato	

=== Moldova ===
Affiliated institution	School	Location	Ref.
Nicolae Testemiţanu State University of Medicine and Pharmacy	Department of Pharmacy	Chişinău	

=== Montenegro ===
Affiliated institution	School	Location	Ref.
University of Montenegro	Faculty of Pharmacy	Podgorica	

=== Morocco ===
Affiliated institution	School	Location	Ref.
Mohammed V University at Souissi	Faculty of Medicine and Pharmacy	Rabat	
University of Hassan II Casablanca	Faculty of Medicine and Pharmacy	Casablanca	

=== Myanmar ===
Affiliated institution	School	Location	Ref.
	University of Pharmacy	Mandalay	
	University of Pharmacy	North Okkalapa	

== N ==
=== Namibia ===
Affiliated institution	School	Location	Ref.
University of Namibia	School of Pharmacy	Windhoek	

=== Nepal ===
Affiliated institution	School	Location	Ref.
Crimson College of Technology	Department of Pharmacy	Devinagar	
Kathmandu University	Department of Pharmacy	Dhulikhel	
Pokhara University	Department of Pharmacy	Pokhara	
Purbanchal University	Department of Medical and Allied science	Biratnagar	
Tribhuvan University	Department of Pharmacy	Kirtipur	

=== Netherlands ===
Affiliated institution	School	Location	Ref.
Leiden University	Leiden/Amsterdam Center for Drug Research	Leiden	
University of Groningen	Department of Pharmacy	Groningen	
Utrecht University	Faculty of Pharmacy	Utrecht	

=== New Zealand ===
Affiliated institution	School	Location	Ref.
University of Auckland	Department of Pharmacy	Auckland	
University of Otago	School of Pharmacy	Dunedin	

=== North Korea ===
Affiliated institution	School	Location	Ref.
	Sariwon Pharmaceutical College of Koryo	Sariwon	

=== North Macedonia ===
Affiliated institution	School	Location	Ref.
Goce Delčev University of Štip	Faculty of Medical Sciences	Štip	
Ss. Cyril and Methodius University of Skopje	Faculty of Pharmacy	Skopje	

=== Norway ===
Affiliated institution	School	Location	Ref.
University of Tromsø	Institute of Pharmacy	Tromsø	

== P ==
=== Pakistan ===
Affiliation	School	Location	Ref.
Bahauddin Zakariya University	Faculty of Pharmacy	Multan	
Baqai Medical University	Baqai Institute of Pharmaceutical Sciences	Nazimabad	
COMSATS University Islamabad, Abbottabad Campus	Department of Pharmacy	Abbottabad Campus	
Federal Urdu University	Faculty of Pharmacy	Gulshan	
Government College University (Faisalabad)	College of Pharmacy	Faisalabad	
Gomal University	Faculty of Pharmacy	D.I. Khan	
Hajvery University	School of Pharmacy	Lahore	
Hamdard University	Faculty of Pharmacy	Karachi, Islamabad	
Islamia University	Faculty of Pharmacy	Bahawalpur	
Jinnah Medical and Dental College	Faculty of Pharmacy	Karachi	
Jinnah University for Women	Faculty of Pharmacy	Karachi	
Lahore College of Pharmaceutical Sciences	School of Pharmaceutical Sciences	Lahore	
Kohat University of Science and Technology	Facualty of Pharmacy	Kohat	
Lahore College for Women University	Department of Pharmacy	Lahore	
Quaid-i-Azam University	Department of Pharmacy	Islamabad	
Riphah International University	Department of Pharmacy	Islamabad	
Sarhad University of Science and Information Technology	Department of Pharmacy	Hayatabad	
University of Balochistan	Faculty of Pharmacy	Quetta	
University of Central Punjab	Faculty of Pharmacy	Lahore	
University of Faisalabad	Faculty of Pharmaceutical Sciences	Faisalabad	
University of Health Sciences	Yusra Institute of Pharmaceutical Sciences	Islamabad	
University of Karachi	Faculty of Pharmacy	Gulshan	
University of Lahore	Department of Pharmacy	Lahore	
University of Malakand	Department of Pharmacy	Malakand Division	
University of Peshawar	Department of Pharmacy	Peshawar	
University of the Punjab	University College of Pharmacy	Lahore	
University of Sargodha	Faculty of Pharmacy	Sargodha	
University of Sindh	Faculty of Pharmacy	Jamshoro	
University of Swabi	Department of Pharmacy	Swabi	
University of Veterinary and Animal Sciences	Department of Pharmacy	Lahore	
Ziauddin University	Ziauddin College of Pharmacy, Karachi	North Nazimabad	
Lahore College of Pharmaceutical Sciences	School of Pharmacy(Uos)	Lahore	

=== Palestine ===
Affiliated institution	School	Location	Ref.
Al-Azhar University – Gaza	Faculty of Pharmacy	Gaza City	
An-Najah National University	Faculty of Pharmacy	Nablus	
Al-Quds University	Faculty of Pharmacy	multiple	
Hebron University	Faculty of Pharmacy	Hebron	

=== Peru ===
Affiliated institution	School	Location	Ref.
Catholic University of Santa María	Faculty of Pharmacy and Biochemistry	Arequipa	
Cayetano Heredia University	Faculty of Science and Philosophy	Lima	
National University of San Marcos	Faculty of Pharmacy and Biochemistry	Lima	

=== Philippines ===
Affiliated institution	School	Location	Ref.
Adamson University	College of Pharmacy	Manila	
Angeles University Foundation	Department of Pharmacy	Angeles City	
Cebu Doctors' University	College of Pharmacy	Mandaue	
Centro Escolar University	School of Pharmacy	Manila	
Emilio Aguinaldo College	College of Pharmacy	Manila	
Far Eastern University – Nicanor Reyes Medical Foundation	School of Pharmacy	Quezon City	
Lyceum-Northwestern University	College of Pharmacy	Dagupan	
Manila Central University	College of Pharmacy	Caloocan	
Mariano Marcos State University	Department of Pharmacy	multiple, Ilocos Norte	
National University	Department of Pharmacy	Manila	
Negros Oriental State University	College of Pharmacy	Negros Oriental	
Nueva Ecija College	College of Pharmacy	Nueva Ecija	
Our Lady of Fatima University	College of Pharmacy	multiple	
Philippine Women's University	School of Pharmacy	Manila	
Saint Louis University	Department of Pharmacy	Baguio	
Saint Paul University Philippines	College of Pharmacy	Tuguergaro	
San Pedro College	College of Pharmacy	Mindanao	
Southwestern University	College of Pharmacy	Cebu City	
University of Bohol	College of Pharmacy	Tagbilaran	
University of Luzon	College of Pharmacy	Dagupan	
University of Perpetual Help System JONELTA	College of Pharmacy	Biñan	
University of Perpetual Help System DALTA	College of Pharmacy	multiple	
University of San Agustin	College of Pharmacy and Medical Technology	Iloilo City	
University of San Carlos	College of Pharmacy	Cebu City	
University of Santo Tomas	Faculty of Pharmacy	Manila	
University of Southern Philippines Foundation	College of Pharmacy	Cebu City	
University of the Immaculate Conception	College of Pharmacy	Davao City	
University of the Philippines Manila	College of Pharmacy	Manila	
University of the Visayas	College of Pharmacy	Cebu City	
University of Zamboanga	Department of Pharmacy	Zamboanga City	
Virgen Milagrosa University Foundation	College of Pharmacy	San Carlos	

=== Poland ===
Affiliated institution	School	Location	Ref.
Medical University of Gdańsk	Faculty of Pharmacy	Gdańsk	
Jagiellonian University	Faculty of Pharmacy and Division of Medical Analytics	Kraków	
Medical University of Białystok	Faculty of Pharmacy	Białystok	
Medical University of Lublin	Faculty of Pharmacy	Lublin	
Medical University of Łódź	Faculty of Pharmacy	Łódź	
Medical University of Silesia	Faculty of Pharmacy	Katowice	
Medical University of Warsaw	Faculty of Pharmacy with Laboratory Medicine Division	Warsaw	
Nicolaus Copernicus University	Medical College in Bydgoszcz, Faculty of Pharmacy	Toruń	
Poznań University of Medical Sciences	Faculty of Pharmacy	Poznań	
Wrocław Medical University	Faculty of Pharmacy	Wrocław	

=== Portugal ===
Affiliated institution	School	Location	Ref.
Egas Moniz Health Sciences Institute	Department of Pharmacy	Almada	
Fernando Pessoa University	Faculty of Health Sciences	Porto, Ponte de Lima	
Lusophone University of Humanities and Technologies	Department of Health Sciences	Lisbon	
Northern Health Sciences Institute	Department of Pharmaceutical Sciences	Paredes	
University of Algarve	Department of Chemistry, Biochemistry and Pharmacy	Faro	
University of Beira Interior	Faculty of Health Sciences	Covilhã	
University of Coimbra	Faculty of Pharmacy	Coimbra	
University of Lisbon	Faculty of Pharmacy	Lisbon	
University of Porto	Faculty of Pharmacy	Porto	

== Q ==
=== Qatar ===
Affiliated institution	School	Location	Ref.
Qatar University	College of Pharmacy	Doha	

== R ==
=== Romania ===
Affiliated institution	School	Location	Ref.
University of Medicine, Pharmacy, Science and Technology of Târgu Mureș	Faculty of Pharmacy	Targu Mureș	umfst.ro
Carol Davila University of Medicine and Pharmacy	Faculty of Pharmacy	Bucharest	
Grigore T. Popa University of Medicine and Pharmacy	Faculty of Pharmacy	Iași	
Iuliu Hațieganu University of Medicine and Pharmacy	Faculty of Pharmacy	Cluj-Napoca	
University of Medicine and Pharmacy of Craiova	Faculty of Pharmacy	Craiova	
Victor Babeș University of Medicine and Pharmacy	Faculty of Pharmacy	Timișoara	

=== Russia ===
Affiliated institution	School	Location	Ref.
Altai Medical Institute	Pharmaceutical Faculty		
Bashkirski Medical Institute	Pharmaceutical Faculty		
Belgorod State University	Pharmaceutical Faculty	Belgorod	
Irkutsk Medical Institute	Pharmaceutical Faculty		
Kazan State Medical University	Pharmaceutical Faculty	Kazan	
Kemerovo Medical Institute	Pharmaceutical Faculty		
Khabarovsk State Pharmaceutical Institute	Pharmaceutical Faculty	Khabarovsk	
Kursk Medical Institute	Pharmaceutical Faculty		
Moscow Medical Academy	Pharmaceutical Faculty	Moscow	
	Perm Pharmaceutical Institute		
	Pyatigorsk State Pharmaceutical Academy		
Rjazan Medical Institute	Pharmaceutical Faculty		
Samara Medical Institute	Pharmaceutical Faculty		
Sibir Medical University	Pharmaceutical Faculty		
St. Petersburg State Chemical-Pharmaceutical Academy			
	St. Petersburg State Pharmaceutical College		
Tumen Medical Institute	Pharmaceutical Faculty		
Yaroslavl Medical Institute	Pharmaceutical Faculty		

=== Rwanda ===
Affiliated institution	School	Location	Ref.
University of Rwanda	Department of Pharmacy	multiple	

== S ==
=== Saudi Arabia ===
Affiliated institution	School	Location	Ref.
Al Baha University	Faculty of Clinical Pharmacy	Al Bahah	
Al Jouf University	College of Pharmacy	Sakakah	
Islamic University of Madinah	Faculty of Pharmacy	Medina	IBNSINA National Pharmacy College Faculty of Pharmacy Jeddah
Jazan University	College of Pharmacy	Jizan	
King Abdulaziz University	Faculty of Pharmacy	Jeddah	
King Faisal University	Faculty of Pharmacy	Hofuf	
King Khalid University	Faculty of Pharmacy	'Asir Region	
King Saud University	Faculty of Pharmacy	Riyadh	
Najran University	Faculty of Pharmacy	Najran	
Northern Borders University	Faculty of Pharmacy	Rafha	
Princess Nora bint Abdul Rahman University	Faculty of Pharmacy	Riyadh	
Qassim University	Faculty of Pharmacy	Al-Qassim Region	
Salman bin Abdulaziz University	Faculty of Pharmacy	Al-Kharj	
Shaqra University	Faculty of Pharmacy	Shaqra	
Taibah University	Faculty of Pharmacy	Medina	
Taif University	Faculty of Pharmacy	Ta'if	
Riyadh College of Dentistry and Pharmacy	Faculty of Pharmacy	Riyadh	
Umm al-Qura University	Faculty of Pharmacy	Mecca	

=== Serbia ===
Affiliated institution	School	Location	Ref.
University of Belgrade	Faculty of Pharmacy	Belgrade	
University of Kragujevac	Department of Pharmacy	Kragujevac	
University of Niš	Department of Pharmacy	Niš	
University of Novi Sad	Department of Pharmaceutical Engineering	Novi Sad	

=== Singapore ===
Affiliated institution	School	Location	Ref.
Nanyang Polytechnic	School of Chemical & Life Sciences	Yio Chu Kang	
National University of Singapore	Department of Pharmacy	Singapore	
Ngee Ann Polytechnic	School of Life Sciences & Chemical Technology	Clementi	
Republic Polytechnic	School of Applied Science	Woodlands	
Temasek Polytechnic	School of Applied Science	Tampines	

=== Slovakia ===
Affiliated institution	School	Location	Ref.
Comenius University	Faculty of Pharmacy	Bratislava	
University of Veterinary Medicine and Pharmacy	Department of Pharmacy	Košice	

=== Slovenia ===
Affiliated institution	School	Location	Ref.
University of Ljubljana	Faculty of Pharmacy	Ljubljana	

=== South Africa ===
Affiliated institution	School	Location	Ref.
Nelson Mandela Metropolitan University	Department of Pharmacy	Port Elizabeth	
North-West University	School of Pharmacy	Potchefstroom	
Rhodes University	School of Pharmaceutical Sciences	Grahamstown	
University of KwaZulu–Natal	School of Pharmacy	Westville	
University of Limpopo, Tshwane University of Technology	School of Pharmacy	Medunsa	
University of Limpopo	School of Pharmacy	Sovenga	
University of the Western Cape	School of Pharmacy	Bellville	
University of the Witwatersrand	Department of Pharmacy	Johannesburg	

=== South Korea ===
Affiliated institution	School	Location	Ref.
Ajou University	College of pharmacy	Suwon	
Pusan National University	College of Pharmacy	Busan	
Catholic University of Daegu	College of Pharmacy	Daegu	
CHA University	College of Pharmacy	Pocheon	
Chonnam National University	College of Pharmacy	Gwangju	
Chosun University	College of Pharmacy	Gwangu	
Chung-Ang University	College of Pharmacy	Seoul	
Chungbuk National University	College of Pharmacy	Cheongju	
Chungnam National University	College of Pharmacy	Daejeon	
Dongduk Women's University	College of Pharmacy	Seoul	
Dongguk University	College of Pharmacy	Seoul, Goyang	
Duksung Women's University	College of Pharmacy	Seoul	
Ewha Womans University	College of Pharmacy	Seoul	
Gyeongsang National University	College of Pharmacy	Jinju	
Inje University	College of Pharmacy	Gimhae	
Kangwon National University	College of Pharmacy	Chuncheon	
Korea University	College of Pharmacy	Seoul	
Kyung Hee University	College of Pharmacy	Seoul	
Kyungpook National University	College of Pharmacy	Daegu	
Kyungsung University	College of Pharmacy	Busan	
Sahmyook University	College of Pharmacy	Seoul	
Seoul National University	College of Pharmacy	Seoul	
Sookmyung Women's University	College of Pharmacy	Yongsan-gu	
Sungkyunkwan University	College of Pharmacy	Seoul, Suwon	
Wonkwang University	College of Pharmacy	Iksan	
Woosuk University	College of Pharmacy	Wanju-gun	
Yeungnam University	College of Pharmacy	Gyeongsan	
Yonsei University	College of Pharmacy	Seoul, Incheon	
Mokpo National University	College of Pharmacy	Mokpo	

=== Spain ===
Affiliated institution	School	Location	Ref.
Complutense University of Madrid	Faculty of Pharmacy	Madrid	
Miguel Hernández University of Elche	Faculty of Pharmacy	Alicante	
University of Alcalá	Faculty of Pharmacy	Alcalá de Henares	
University of Barcelona	Faculty of Pharmacy	Barcelona	
University of the Basque Country	Faculty of Pharmacy	multiple	
University of Granada	Faculty of Pharmacy	Granada	
University of La Laguna	Faculty of Pharmacy	San Cristóbal de La Laguna	
University of Navarra	Faculty of Pharmacy	Pamplona	
University of Salamanca	Faculty of Pharmacy	Salamanca	
University of Santiago de Compostela	Faculty of Pharmacy	Santiago de Compostela	
University of Seville	Faculty of Pharmacy	Seville	
University of Valencia	Faculty of Pharmacy	Valencia	

=== Sri Lanka ===
Affiliated institution	School	Location	Ref.
University of Jaffna	Faculty of Medicine	Jaffna	
University of Peradeniya	Department of Pharmacy	Peradeniya	
University of Ruhuna	Faculty of Medicine	Matara	
University of Sri Jayewardenepura	Department of Allied Health Sciences	Gangodawila	

=== Sudan ===
Affiliated institution	School	Location	Ref.
Ahfad University for Women		Omdurman	
Khartoum College of Medical Sciences		Khartoum	
Omdurman Islamic University		Omdurman	
University of Khartoum		Khartoum	
University of Medical Sciences and Technology		Khartoum	
University of Gezira		Madani	
Neelain University		Khartoum	
Razi University		Khartoum	
Ribat University		Khartoum	
Karari University		Omdurman	

=== Sweden ===
Affiliated institution	School	Location	Ref.
Umeå University	Faculty of Medicine	Umeå	
University of Gothenburg	Sahlgrenska akademin	Gothenburg	
Uppsala University	Faculty of Pharmacy	Uppsala	

=== Switzerland ===
Affiliated institution	School	Location	Ref.
ETH Zurich	Institute of Pharmaceutical Sciences	Zürich	
Geneva-Lausanne School of Pharmacy	Department of Pharmacy	Geneva	
University of Basel	Department of Pharmacy	Basel	
University of Lausanne	Department of Pharmacy	Lausanne	

=== Syria ===
Affiliated institution	School	Location	Ref.
Arab International University	Faculty of Pharmacy	Ghabaghib	
Damascus University	Faculty of Pharmacy	Damascus	
Ebla Private University	School of Pharmacy	Idlib	
Homs University	Faculty of Pharmacy	Homs	
International University for Science and Technology		Oum el Qusur	
Latakia University	Faculty of Pharmacy	Latakia	
Kalmoon University	School of Pharmacy	Deir Attiya	
Syrian Private University		Damascus	
University of Aleppo	Faculty of Pharmacy	Aleppo	
Al-Andalus University for Medical Sciences	Faculty of Pharmacy	Al-Qadmus	
Al-Rasheed International Private University	Faculty of Pharmacy	Damascus	
Al-Sham Private University	Faculty of Pharmacy	Al-Tall	

== T ==
=== Tajikistan ===
Affiliated institution	School	Location	Ref.
Tajik Medical Institute	Pharmaceutical Faculty		

=== Taiwan (Republic of China) ===
Affiliated institution	School	Location	Ref.
Chia Nan University of Pharmacy and Science	College of Pharmacy and Science	Rende District	
China Medical University	Department of Pharmacy	Taichung	
Kaohsiung Medical University	School of Pharmacy	Kaohsiung	
National Defense Medical Center	School of Pharmacy	Taipei	
National Taiwan University	School of Pharmacy	Daan District	
Taipei Medical University	School of Pharmacy	Xinyi District	
Tajen University	Department of Pharmacy	Yanpu	

=== Tanzania ===
Affiliated institution	School	Location	Ref.
Catholic University of Health and Allied Sciences	School of Pharmacy	Mwanza	
Kampala International University Dar es Salaam College		Dar es Salaam	
Muhimbili University of Health and Allied Sciences	School of Pharmacy	Dar es Salaam	
St. John's University of Tanzania	School of Pharmacy and Pharmaceutical Sciences	Dodoma	

=== Thailand ===
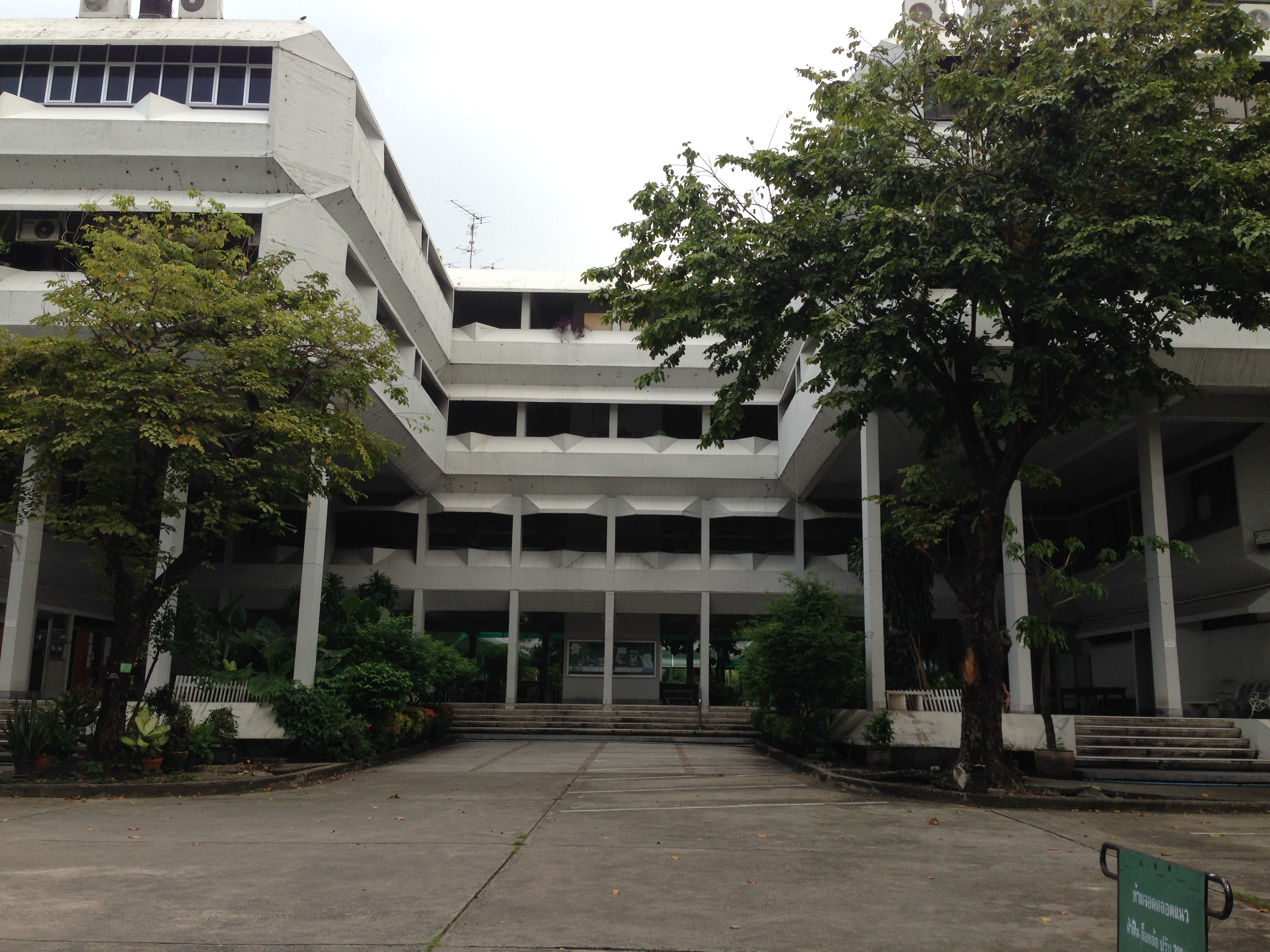
The Faculty of Pharmaceutical Sciences, Chulalongkorn University

Affiliated institution	School	Location	Ref.
Burapha University	Faculty of Pharmaceutical Sciences	Chonburi	
Chiang Mai University	Faculty of Pharmacy	Chiang Mai	
Chulalongkorn University	Faculty of Pharmaceutical Sciences	Bangkok	
Eastern Asia University	School of Pharmacy	Pathum Thani	
Huachiew Chalermprakiet University	Faculty of Pharmaceutical Sciences	Bangkok	
Khon Kaen University	Faculty of Pharmaceutical Sciences	Khon Kaen	
Mahasarakham University	Faculty of Pharmacy	Maha Sarakham	
Mahidol University	Faculty of Pharmacy	Bangkok	
Naresuan University	Faculty of Pharmaceutical Sciences	Phitsanulok	
University of Phayao	School of Pharmaceutical Sciences	Phayao	
Payap University	Faculty of Pharmacy	Chiang Mai	
Prince of Songkla University	Faculty of Pharmaceutical Sciences	Songkhla	
Rangsit University	Faculty of Pharmacy	Pathum Thani	
Siam University	Faculty of Pharmacy	Bangkok	
Silpakorn University	Faculty of Pharmacy	Nakhon Pathom	
Srinakharinwirot University	Faculty of Pharmaceutical Sciences	Nakhon Nayok	
Thammasart University	School of Pharmacy	Pathum Thani	
Ubon Ratchathani University	Faculty of Pharmaceutical Sciences	Ubon Ratchathani	
Walailak University	School of Pharmacy	Nakhon Si Thammarat	

=== Trinidad and Tobago ===
Affiliated institution	School	Location	Ref.
University of the West Indies	School of Pharmacy	Mt. Hope	

=== Tunisia ===
Affiliated institution	School	Location	Ref.
University of Monastir	Faculty of Pharmacy of Monastir	Monastir	

=== Turkey ===
Affiliated institution	School	Location	Ref.
Acıbadem University	Faculty of Pharmacy	Istanbul	
Adıyaman University	Faculty of Pharmacy	Adıyaman	
Ağrı İbrahim Çeçen University	Faculty of Pharmacy	Ağrı	
Akdeniz University	Faculty of Pharmacy	Antalya	
Altınbaş University	Faculty of Pharmacy	Istanbul	
Anadolu University	Faculty of Pharmacy	Eskişehir	
Ankara University	Faculty of Pharmacy	Ankara	
Atatürk University	Faculty of Pharmacy	Erzurum	
Bezmialem Foundation University	Faculty of Pharmacy	Istanbul	
Biruni University	Faculty of Pharmacy	Istanbul	
Bülent Ecevit University	Faculty of Pharmacy	Erciyes	
Cumhuriyet University	Faculty of Pharmacy	Sivas	
Çukurova University	Faculty of Pharmacy	Adana	
Dicle University	Faculty of Pharmacy	Diyarbakır	
Ege University	Faculty of Pharmacy	İzmir	
Erciyes University	Faculty of Pharmacy	Kayseri	
Erzincan University	Faculty of Pharmacy	Erzincan	
Gazi University	Faculty of Pharmacy	Ankara	
Hacettepe University	Faculty of Pharmacy	Ankara	
Harran University	Faculty of Pharmacy	Şanlıurfa	
Istanbul Medipol University	Faculty of Pharmacy	Istanbul	
Istanbul University	Faculty of Pharmacy	Istanbul	
Istinye University	Faculty of Pharmacy	Istanbul	
İnönü University	Faculty of Pharmacy	Malatya	
Karadeniz Technical University	Faculty of Pharmacy	Trabzon	
Marmara University	Faculty of Pharmacy	Istanbul	
Mersin University	Faculty of Pharmacy	Mersin	
Recep Tayyip Erdoğan University	Faculty of Pharmacy	Rize	
Selçuk University	Faculty of Pharmacy	Konya	
Tokat Gaziosmanpaşa University	Faculty of Pharmacy	Tokat	
Trakya University	Faculty of Pharmacy	Edirne	
Yeditepe University	Faculty of Pharmacy	Istanbul	
Yeni Yüzyıl University	Faculty of Pharmacy	Istanbul	
Yüzüncü Yıl University	Faculty of Pharmacy	Van	

== U ==
=== Ukraine ===
Affiliated institution	School	Location	Ref.
Danylo Halytsky Lviv National Medical University	Department of Pharmacy	Lviv	
National University of Pharmacy		Kharkiv	
Odesa National Medical University	Department of Pharmacy	Odesa	

=== Uganda ===
Affiliated institution	School	Location	Ref.
Makerere University School of Health Sciences	Department of Pharmacy	Mulago	
Mbarara University of Science and Technology		Mbarara	
	Soroti Pharmaceutical Training College	Soroti District	

=== United Arab Emirates ===
Affiliated institution	School	Location	Ref.
Al Ain University of Science and Technology	Faculty of Pharmacy and Health Sciences	Al Ain	
Ajman University of Science and Technology	Faculty of Pharmacy and Health Sciences	Ajman, Fujairah	
	Dubai Pharmacy College	Muhaisnah	
Gulf Medical University	College of Pharmacy	Ajman	
RAK Medical and Health Sciences University	College of Pharmaceutical Sciences	Ras al Khaimah	
University of Sharjah	College of Pharmacy	University City of Sharjah	

=== United Kingdom ===
Affiliated institution	School	Location	Ref.
Aston University	Birmingham School of Pharmacy	Gosta Green	
Cardiff University	Welsh School of Pharmacy	Cardiff	
De Montfort University	School of Pharmacy	Leicester	
Keele University	School of Pharmacy	Newcastle-under-Lyme	
King's College London	Department of Pharmacy	London	
Kingston University	Department of Pharmacy	Kingston	
Liverpool John Moores University	School of Pharmacy and Chemistry	Liverpool	
Newcastle University	School of Medical Education	Newcastle upon Tyne	
Queen's University Belfast	School of Pharmacy	Belfast	
Robert Gordon University	School of Pharmacy	Aberdeen	
University of Bath	Department of Pharmacy and Pharmacology	Bath	
University of Birmingham	School of Pharmacy	Birmingham	
University of Bradford	School of Life Sciences	Bradford	
University of Brighton	School of Pharmacy and Biomolecular Sciences	Moulsecoomb	
University of Central Lancashire	School of Pharmacy and Pharmaceutical Sciences	Preston	
University College London	UCL School of Pharmacy	London	
University of East Anglia	School of Pharmacy	Norwich	
University of Greenwich/University of Kent	Medway School of Pharmacy	Medway	
University of Hertfordshire	School of Pharmacy	multiple	
University of Huddersfield	Division of Pharmacy and Pharmaceutical Sciences	Huddersfield	
University of Lincoln	Lincoln School of Pharmacy	Lincoln	
University of Manchester	School of Pharmacy and Pharmaceutical Sciences	Manchester	
University of Nottingham	School of Pharmacy	Nottingham	
University of Portsmouth	School of Pharmacy and Biomedical Sciences	Portsmouth	
University of Reading	School of Pharmacy	Reading	
University of Strathclyde	Strathclyde Institute of Pharmacy and Biomedical Sciences	Glasgow	
University of Sunderland	School of Health, Natural and Social Sciences	Sunderland	
University of Sussex	School of Life Sciences	Falmer	
Ulster University	School of Pharmacy and Pharmaceutical Sciences	multiple	
University of Wolverhampton	School of Applied Sciences	multiple	

=== United States ===
==== Alabama ====
Affiliated institution	School	Location	Ref.
Auburn University	Harrison College of Pharmacy	Auburn	
Samford University	McWhorter School of Pharmacy	Birmingham	

==== Arizona ====
Affiliated institution	School	Location	Ref.
Midwestern University	College of Pharmacy	Glendale	
University of Arizona	R. Ken Coit College of Pharmacy	Tucson	

==== Arkansas ====
Affiliated institution	School	Location	Ref.
Harding University	College of Pharmacy	Searcy	
University of Arkansas for Medical Sciences	College of Pharmacy	Little Rock	

==== California ====
Affiliated institution	School	Location	Ref.
American University of Health Sciences	School of Pharmacy	Signal Hill	
California Health Sciences University	School of Pharmacy	Clovis	
California Northstate University College of Pharmacy	College of Pharmacy	Sacramento	
Chapman University	School of Pharmacy	Irvine	
Keck Graduate Institute	School of Pharmacy	Claremont	
Loma Linda University	School of Pharmacy	Loma Linda	
Marshall B. Ketchum University	College of Pharmacy	Fullerton	
Touro University California	College of Pharmacy	Vallejo	
University of California, Irvine	School of Pharmacy and Pharmaceutical Sciences	Irvine	
University of California, San Diego	Skaggs School of Pharmacy	La Jolla	
University of California, San Francisco	UCSF School of Pharmacy	San Francisco	
University of the Pacific	Thomas J. Long School of Pharmacy & Health Science	Stockton	
University of Southern California	USC Alfred E. Mann School of Pharmacy and Pharmaceutical Sciences	Los Angeles	
West Coast University	College of Pharmacy	Los Angeles	
Western University of Health Sciences	College of Pharmacy	Pomona	

==== Colorado ====
Affiliated institution	School	Location	Ref.
Regis University	Rueckert-Hartman School for Health Professions	Denver	
University of Colorado Denver	Skaggs School of Pharmacy	Denver	

==== Connecticut ====
Affiliated institution	School	Location	Ref.
Saint Joseph University	School of Pharmacy and Physician Assistant Studies	West Hartford	
University of Connecticut	School of Pharmacy	Storrs	

==== District of Columbia ====
Affiliated institution	School	Location	Ref.
Howard University	School of Pharmacy, College of Pharmacy, Nursing & AHS	Washington, D.C.	

==== Florida ====
Affiliated institution	School	Location	Ref.
Florida Agricultural and Mechanical University	College of Pharmacy and Pharmaceutical Sciences	Tallahassee	
Lake Erie College of Osteopathic Medicine	LECOM School of Pharmacy Bradenton Campus	Bradenton	
Nova Southeastern University	Barry and Judy Silverman College of Pharmacy	Davie	
Palm Beach Atlantic University	School of Pharmacy	West Palm Beach	
University of Florida	University of Florida College of Pharmacy	Gainesville	
University of South Florida	College of Pharmacy	Tampa	

==== Georgia ====
Affiliated institution	School	Location	Ref.
Mercer University	Mercer University Health Sciences Center	Atlanta	
Philadelphia College of Osteopathic Medicine	School of Pharmacy, Georgia campus	Suwanee	
South University	School of Pharmacy	Savannah	
University of Georgia	University of Georgia College of Pharmacy	Athens	

==== Hawaii ====
Affiliated institution	School	Location	Ref.
University of Hawaii at Hilo	Daniel K. Inouye College of Pharmacy	Hilo	

==== Idaho ====
Affiliated institution	School	Location	Ref.
Idaho State University	College of Pharmacy	Pocatello	

==== Illinois ====
Affiliated institution	School	Location	Ref.
Chicago State University	College of Pharmacy	Chicago	
Midwestern University	Chicago College of Pharmacy	Downers Grove	
Roosevelt University	College of Pharmacy	Schaumburg	
Rosalind Franklin University of Medicine and Science	College of Pharmacy	North Chicago	
Southern Illinois University Edwardsville	SIUE School of Pharmacy	Edwardsville	
University of Illinois at Chicago	UIC College of Pharmacy	Chicago	

==== Indiana ====
Affiliated institution	School	Location	Ref.
Butler University	College of Pharmacy and Health Sciences	Indianapolis	
Manchester University	College of Pharmacy	North Manchester	
Purdue University	Purdue University College of Pharmacy	West Lafayette	

==== Iowa ====
Affiliated institution	School	Location	Ref.
Drake University	Drake University College of Pharmacy & Health Sciences	Des Moines	
University of Iowa	University of Iowa College of Pharmacy	Iowa City	

==== Kansas ====
Affiliated institution	School	Location	Ref.
University of Kansas	School of Pharmacy	Lawrence	

==== Kentucky ====
Affiliated institution	School	Location	Ref.
Sullivan University	College of Pharmacy and Health Sciences	Louisville	
University of Kentucky	University of Kentucky College of Pharmacy	Lexington	

==== Louisiana ====
Affiliated institution	School	Location	Ref.
University of Louisiana at Monroe	College of Pharmacy	Monroe	
Xavier University of Louisiana	College of Pharmacy	New Orleans	

==== Maine ====
Affiliated institution	School	Location	Ref.
Husson University	School of Pharmacy	Bangor	
University of New England	School of Pharmacy	Portland	

==== Maryland ====
Affiliated institution	School	Location	Ref.
Notre Dame of Maryland University	School of Pharmacy	Baltimore	
University of Maryland	School of Pharmacy	Baltimore	

==== Massachusetts ====
Affiliated institution	School	Location	Ref.
Massachusetts College of Pharmacy and Health Sciences	School of Pharmacy-Boston	Boston	
Massachusetts College of Pharmacy and Health Sciences	School of Pharmacy-Worcester	Worcester	
Northeastern University	Northeastern University School of Pharmacy	Boston	
Western New England University	College of Pharmacy and Health Sciences	Springfield	

==== Michigan ====
Affiliated institution	School	Location	Ref.
Ferris State University	College of Pharmacy	Big Rapids	
University of Michigan	University of Michigan College of Pharmacy	Ann Arbor	
Wayne State University	Eugene Applebaum College of Pharmacy and Health Sciences	Detroit	

==== Minnesota ====
Affiliated institution	School	Location	Ref.
University of Minnesota	University of Minnesota College of Pharmacy	Minneapolis and Duluth	

==== Mississippi ====
Affiliated institution	School	Location	Ref.
University of Mississippi	School of Pharmacy	Oxford	
William Carey University	School of Pharmacy	Biloxi	

==== Missouri ====
Affiliated institution	School	Location	Ref.
University of Health Sciences and Pharmacy in St. Louis	University of Health Sciences and Pharmacy in St. Louis	St. Louis	
University of Missouri–Kansas City	School of Pharmacy	Kansas City	

==== Montana ====
Affiliated institution	School	Location	Ref.
University of Montana	Skaggs School of Pharmacy	Missoula	

==== Nebraska ====
Affiliated institution	School	Location	Ref.
Creighton University	School of Pharmacy and Health Professions	Omaha	
University of Nebraska	College of Pharmacy	Omaha	

==== Nevada ====
Affiliated institution	School	Location	Ref.
Roseman University of Health Sciences	College of Pharmacy	Henderson	

==== New Jersey ====
Affiliated institution	School	Location	Ref.
Fairleigh Dickinson University	School of Pharmacy and Health Sciences	Florham Park	
Rutgers University	Ernest Mario School of Pharmacy	Piscataway	

==== New Mexico ====
Affiliated institution	School	Location	Ref.
University of New Mexico	College of Pharmacy	Albuquerque	

==== New York ====
Affiliated institution	School	Location	Ref.
D'Youville University	School of Pharmacy	Buffalo	
Long Island University	Arnold & Marie Schwartz College of Pharmacy and Health Sciences	Brooklyn	
St. John Fisher University	Wegmans School of Pharmacy	Rochester	
St. John's University	College of Pharmacy and Health Sciences	New York City	
Binghamton University	School of Pharmacy and Pharmaceutical Sciences	Binghamton	
University at Buffalo	University at Buffalo School of Pharmacy and Pharmaceutical Sciences	Buffalo	
Touro College	College of Pharmacy	New York City	
Union University	Albany College of Pharmacy and Health Sciences	Albany	

==== North Carolina ====
Affiliated institution	School	Location	Ref.
Campbell University	Campbell University School of Pharmacy	Buies Creek	
High Point University	Fred Wilson School of Pharmacy	High Point	
University of North Carolina	UNC Eshelman School of Pharmacy	Chapel Hill	
Wingate University	School of Pharmacy	Wingate	

==== North Dakota ====
Affiliated institution	School	Location	Ref.
North Dakota State University	College of Pharmacy	Fargo	

==== Ohio ====
Affiliated institution	School	Location	Ref.
Cedarville University	School of Pharmacy	Cedarville	
Northeast Ohio Medical University	College of Pharmacy	Rootstown	
Ohio Northern University	Rudolph H. Raabe College of Pharmacy	Ada	
Ohio State University	College of Pharmacy	Columbus	
University of Cincinnati	James L. Winkle College of Pharmacy	Cincinnati	
University of Findlay	College of Pharmacy	Findlay	
University of Toledo	College of Pharmacy & Pharmaceutical Sciences	Toledo	

==== Oklahoma ====
Affiliated institution	School	Location	Ref.
Southwestern Oklahoma State University	School of Pharmacy	Weatherford	
University of Oklahoma	College of Pharmacy	Norman	

==== Oregon ====
Affiliated institution	School	Location	Ref.
Oregon State University	College of Pharmacy	Corvallis	
Pacific University	School of Pharmacy	Hillsboro	

==== Pennsylvania ====
Affiliated institution	School	Location	Ref.
Duquesne University	Duquesne University School of Pharmacy	Pittsburgh	
Lake Erie College of Osteopathic Medicine	LECOM School of Pharmacy	Erie	
Temple University	School of Pharmacy	Philadelphia	
Thomas Jefferson University	Jefferson School of Pharmacy	Philadelphia	
University of the Sciences in Philadelphia	Philadelphia College of Pharmacy	Philadelphia	
University of Pittsburgh	University of Pittsburgh School of Pharmacy	Pittsburgh	
Wilkes University	Nesbitt School of Pharmacy	Wilkes-Barre	

==== Puerto Rico ====
Affiliated institution	School	Location	Ref.
University of Puerto Rico	School of Pharmacy	San Juan	

==== Rhode Island ====
Affiliated institution	School	Location	Ref.
University of Rhode Island	University of Rhode Island College of Pharmacy	Kingston	

==== South Carolina ====
Affiliated institution	School	Location	Ref.
Medical University of South Carolina	College of Pharmacy	Charleston	
Presbyterian College	College of Pharmacy	Clinton	
South University	School of Pharmacy	Columbia	
University of South Carolina	College of Pharmacy	Columbia	

==== South Dakota ====
Affiliated institution	School	Location	Ref.
South Dakota State University	College of Pharmacy and Allied Health Professions	Brookings	

==== Tennessee ====
Affiliated institution	School	Location	Ref.
Belmont University	College of Pharmacy	Nashville	
East Tennessee State University	Bill Gatton College of Pharmacy	Johnson City	
Lipscomb University	College of Pharmacy	Nashville	
South College	School of Pharmacy	Knoxville	
Union University	College of Pharmacy	Jackson	
University of Tennessee Health Science Center	College of Pharmacy	Memphis	

==== Texas ====
Affiliated institution	School	Location	Ref.
Texas A&M University	Irma Lerma Rangel School of Pharmacy	Kingsville	
Texas Southern University	College of Pharmacy and Health Sciences	Houston	
Texas Tech University Health Sciences Center	School of Pharmacy	Amarillo	
University of Houston	College of Pharmacy	Houston	
University of Texas at Austin	College of Pharmacy	Austin	
University of Texas at Tyler	Fische College of Pharmacy	Tyler	
University of the Incarnate Word	Feik School of Pharmacy	San Antonio	
University of North Texas Health Science Center	College of Pharmacy	Fort Worth	

==== Utah ====
Affiliated institution	School	Location	Ref.
Roseman University of Health Sciences	College of Pharmacy	South Jordan	
University of Utah	College of Pharmacy	Salt Lake City	

==== Vermont ====
Affiliated institution	School	Location	Ref.
Albany College of Pharmacy and Health Sciences	Albany College of Pharmacy	Colchester	

==== Virginia ====
Affiliated institution	School	Location	Ref.
Appalachian College of Pharmacy	Appalachian College of Pharmacy	Oakwood	
Hampton University	School of Pharmacy	Hampton	
Shenandoah University	Bernard J. Dunn School of Pharmacy	Winchester	
Virginia Commonwealth University	VCU School of Pharmacy	Richmond	

==== Washington ====
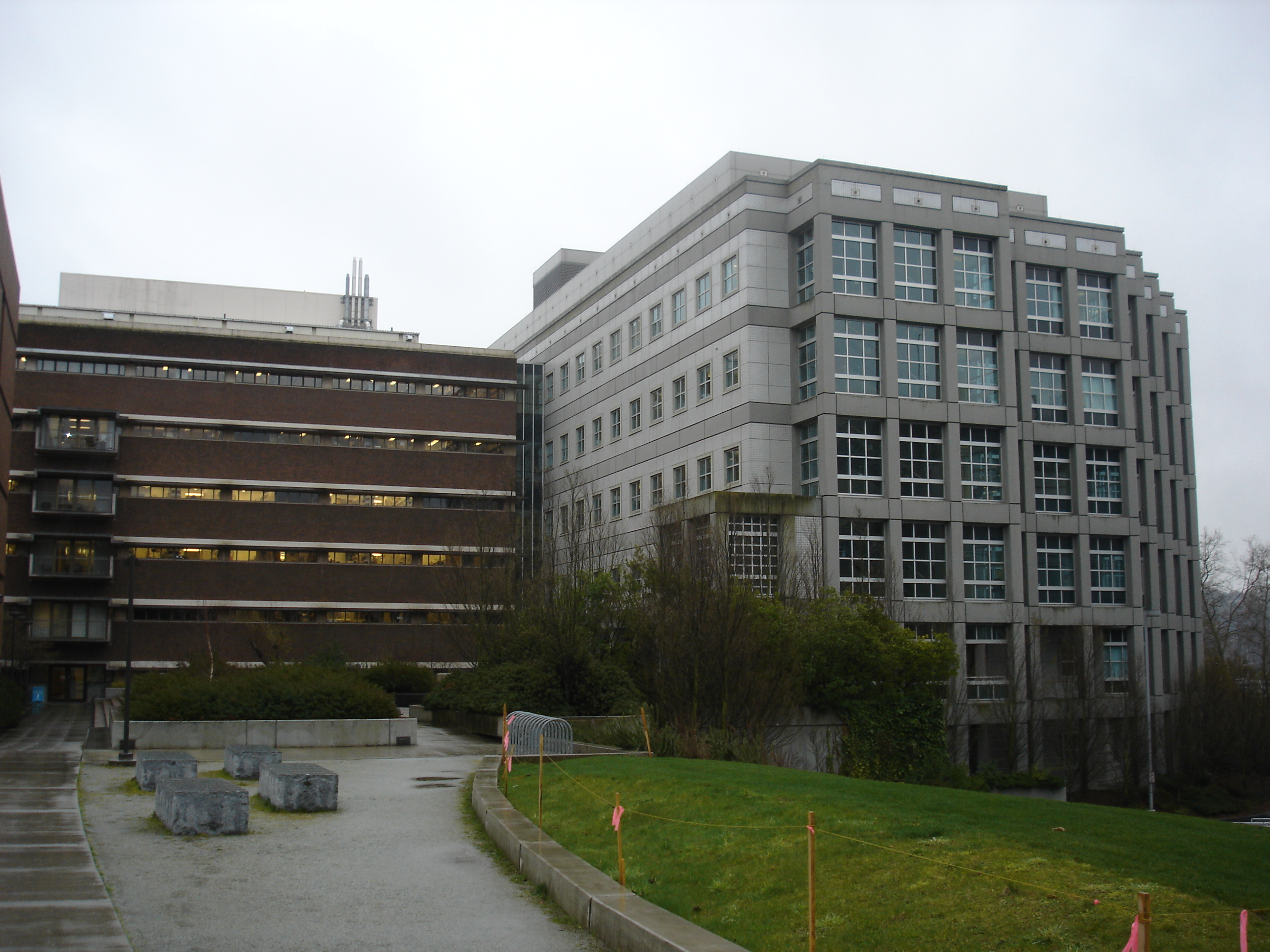
Magnuson Building, University of Washington School of Pharmacy

Affiliated institution	School	Location	Ref.
University of Washington	University of Washington School of Pharmacy	Seattle	
Washington State University	Washington State University College of Pharmacy and Pharmaceutical Sciences	Spokane	

==== West Virginia ====
Affiliated institution	School	Location	Ref.
Marshall University	School of Pharmacy	Huntington	
University of Charleston	School of Pharmacy	Charleston	
West Virginia University	School of Pharmacy	Morgantown	

==== Wisconsin ====
Affiliated institution	School	Location	Ref.
Concordia University Wisconsin	School of Pharmacy	Mequon	
Medical College of Wisconsin	School of Pharmacy	Milwaukee	
University of Wisconsin–Madison	School of Pharmacy	Madison	

==== Wyoming ====
Affiliated institution	School	Location	Ref.
University of Wyoming	School of Pharmacy	Laramie	

=== Uruguay ===
Affiliated institution	School	Location
University of the Republic	Faculty of Chemistry	Montevideo

=== Uzbekistan ===
Affiliated institution	School	Location
Tashkent Pharmaceutical Institute	Tashkent Pharmaceutical Institute	Tashkent

== V ==
=== Venezuela ===
Affiliated institution	School	Location
Central University of Venezuela	Faculty of Pharmacy	Caracas
Universidad Santa María	Faculty of Pharmacy	Caracas
University of the Andes	Faculty of Pharmacy	Mérida

=== Vietnam ===
Affiliated institution	School	Location
Hanoi University of Pharmacy	Hanoi University of Pharmacy	Hanoi
Vietnam National University, Hanoi	University of Medicine and Pharmacy	Hanoi
Ho Chi Minh City Medicine and Pharmacy University	Faculty of Pharmacy	Ho Chi Minh City
Hue College of Medicine and Pharmacy – University of Huế	Faculty of Pharmacy	Huế
Vietnam National University, Ho Chi Minh City	School of Medicine	Ho Chi Minh City
Cần Thơ University of Medicine and Pharmacy	Faculty of Pharmacy	Cần Thơ

== Z ==
=== Zambia ===
Affiliated institution	School	Location
University of Zambia	Department of Pharmacy	Lusaka
Texila American University Zambia	School of Allied Health Sciences	Lusaka

=== Zimbabwe ===
Affiliated institution	School	Location
Harare Institute of Technology	Department of Pharmaceutical Technology	Harare, Zimbabwe
University of Zimbabwe	Department of Pharmacy and Pharmaceutical Sciences	Harare, Zimbabwe

=== See also ===
- History of pharmacy
- List of medical schools
