= Isra University (disambiguation) =

Isra or al-Isra or Israa' or al-Israa University may refer to a university:

- in Jordan, created in 1989
- in Pakistan, created in 1997
- in Palestine, created in 2014
