= Ahvaz Jundishapur University of Medical Sciences =

Medical school in Khuzestan Province of Iran

Coordinates: 31.29735°N 48.65037°E

- دانشگاه علوم پزشکی جندی‌ شاپوراهواز; Daneshgāh-e olum pezeshki-ye Jondi Shāpur-e Ahvāz.
- Ahvaz Jundishapur University of Medical Sciences
- Type: Public
- Established: 1955
- President: Dr Hatam Boostani
- Academic staff: 823
- Total staff: 26000
- Students: 9123
- Location: Ahvaz, Khuzestan, Iran
- Campus: Urban
- Website: www.ajums.ac.ir

== History ==
Ahvaz Jundishapur University of Medical Sciences (AJUMS) is a medical school in Khuzestan Province of Iran.

Located in southwestern Iran in the city of Ahvaz, the university was established as a College of Medicine administered by the Shahid Chamran University of Ahvaz in 1955, which itself was a revived reincarnation of the Academy of Gundishapur that existed in the same area in antiquity. The university separated and fell under the Ministry of Health and Medical Education of Iran in 1986. The university has 3 campuses in Ahvaz, Behbahan, and Abadan, and is constituted of 9 Schools, offering doctorate degrees in science and medicine in 27 fields.

The university administers 8 public hospitals in the city of Ahvaz, and 20 other hospitals in the surrounding areas, as well as dozens of clinics scattered across the province.

Ahvaz Jundishapur University of Medical Sciences has 24 research centers, three research institutes focusing on basic medical sciences, health, and clinical sciences, and one health research institute, two incubators, and a central research laboratory.

== Faculties ==
- Faculty of Paramedical Sciences: The faculty of pharmacy is the only pharmacy faculty in the south of Iran. It was established in 1974. The educational program offered in this school are based upon Iran's nationwide educational schedule prepared by the Ministry of Health and Medical Education of Iran. The degrees available in this faculty are Doctorate of Pharmacy (for Pharmacy students), Ph.D. in Pharmacology, Ph.D. in Pharmaceutics and MSc in Toxicology.
- Faculty of Medicine: The School of Medicine at Ahvaz Jundishapur University of Medical Sciences provides education and training in basic medical sciences and clinical disciplines. Its basic science departments include physiology, medical genetics, immunology, medical biotechnology, microbiology, virology, parasitology, mycology, medical ethics, biochemistry, anatomy, medical physics, and medical education. Clinical departments cover cardiology, internal medicine, otolaryngology, neurology, anesthesiology, asthma and allergy, neurosurgery, general surgery, urology, pathology, emergency medicine, infectious diseases, pediatrics, obstetrics and gynecology, toxicology and forensic medicine, psychiatry, ophthalmology, orthopedics, dermatology, radiology, social medicine, nuclear medicine, and radiation oncology. The school offers medical education at the professional doctorate (MD) level, as well as specialty and subspecialty training. Its academic activities include teaching and research in basic and clinical medical sciences.
- Faculty of Rehabilitation Sciences: The School of Rehabilitation Sciences at Ahvaz Jundishapur University of Medical Sciences was established in 1975 at Imam Khomeini Hospital, initially offering undergraduate training in physiotherapy. The school moved to its current university campus location in 2005 and expanded its clinical services with the establishment of a comprehensive rehabilitation clinic in 2007. Its educational and clinical fields include physiotherapy, speech therapy, occupational therapy, audiology, and orthopedic technology. The school is also associated with research and professional organizations, including the Rehabilitation Research Center and the Comprehensive Child Development Center.
- Faculty of Health sciences: The School of Public Health at Ahvaz Jundishapur University of Medical Sciences was established in 1995. Its academic departments cover public health, environmental health engineering, occupational health engineering, medical entomology and vector control, health services management, biostatistics, epidemiology, and health education and health promotion. The school offers educational programs at undergraduate, master's, and doctoral levels in relevant fields. Its facilities include laboratories supporting teaching and research in public and environmental health. The school also hosts research centers focusing on environmental technologies and the social determinants of health.
- Faculty of Dentistry: The School of Dentistry at Ahvaz Jundishapur University of Medical Sciences was established in 1996. It provides education and training in dentistry and related specialties. Its postgraduate specialty programs include dental prostheses, oral and maxillofacial surgery, oral and maxillofacial radiology, pediatric dentistry, restorative dentistry, orthodontics, periodontics, and endodontics. The school’s academic activities include dental education and research.
- Faculty of Nursing & Midwifery: The School of Nursing and Midwifery at Ahvaz Jundishapur University of Medical Sciences traces its origins to the establishment of a nursing school in Ahvaz in 1968. In 1986, the integration of nursing education programs led to the formation of the school in its current institutional structure. Its academic programs encompass nursing, midwifery, operating room technology, and pre-hospital emergency care. The school offers undergraduate and postgraduate education, including master's and doctoral programs in nursing and midwifery. Its academic departments cover critical care nursing, pediatric nursing, community health nursing, psychiatric nursing, medical-surgical nursing, midwifery, midwifery counseling, and operating room technology. The school also provides facilities for classroom instruction, clinical skills training, library services, and postgraduate study.
- Faculty of Paramedical sciences: The School of Allied Health Sciences at Ahvaz Jundishapur University of Medical Sciences was established in 1972 through the consolidation of several academic departments, including laboratory sciences, radiology, and pharmaceutical sciences. It was initially known as the School of Hospital Sciences and later renamed the School of Medical Technology before adopting its present name. Its academic structure subsequently expanded to include nutrition in 1974, public health in 1976, biomedical engineering in 1977, and anesthesiology and physiotherapy in 1984. The school offers undergraduate and postgraduate programs in fields such as nutrition, laboratory sciences, medical imaging and radiological sciences, anesthesia technology and education, health information technology, and medical informatics.

== Office of International Affairs ==
The Office of International Affairs at the university plays a pivotal role in a strategic approach toward achieving the institution’s global objectives. A comprehensive program implemented by this directorate encompasses a wide range of initiatives, including enhancing the recruitment and support services for international students, expanding scientific and educational collaborations with prestigious foreign universities and institutes, strengthening cultural and consular activities, developing language training infrastructure, and elevating the university’s presence and engagement in global ranking, accreditation, and networking systems.

== Contracting universities ==
Ahvaz Jundishapur University of Medical Sciences has established memorandums of understanding (MoUs) with universities in several countries to facilitate international academic cooperation. These agreements provide a framework for activities such as academic exchanges, sabbatical visits, and collaborative research projects with partner institutions.

- Maysan University
- Al-Turath University
- Saint Petersburg University
- Novosibirsk State University
- Chungnam National University

== Ahvaz Jundishapur University of Medical Science research centers ==
Ahvaz Jundishapur University of Medical Sciences has 24 research centers that conduct research in various fields of medical and health sciences. The university’s Vice-Chancellorship for Research and Technology oversees research activities and supports the development of scientific projects across the university. The research centers provide a framework for academic staff and students to undertake research in their respective fields.

- Physiology Research Center
- Nursing Care Research Center in Chronic Diseases
- Infectious and Tropical Diseases Research Center
- Hyperlipidemia Research Center
- Hearing Research Center
- Nanotechnology Research Center
- Menopause Andropause Research Center
- Environmental Technologies Research Center
- Social Determinants of Health Research Center
- Fertility and Infertility and Fetal Health Research Center
- Eye Infections Research Center
- Atherosclerosis Research Center
- Medicinal Plants Research Center
- Reproductive Health Promotion Research Center
- Thalassemia and Hemoglobinopathy Research Center
- Pain Research Center
- Chronic Renal Failure Research Center
- Diabetes Research Center
- Toxicology Research Center
- Nutrition and Metabolic Diseases Research Center
- Cancer Research Center
- Cellular and Molecular Research Center
- Gastroenterology Research Center
- Air Pollution and Respiratory Diseases research Center

== Hospitals ==
- Ahvaz Razi Hospital
- Ahvaz Aboozar Hospital
- Ahvaz Salamat Hospital
- Ahvaz Golestan Hospital
- Ahvaz Shahid Baghaei Hospital
- Ahvaz Emam Khomeini Hospital
- Ahvaz Taleghani Hospital
- Karoon Sina Hospital

== Central Research Laboratory ==
The Central Research Laboratory of Ahvaz Jundishapur University of Medical Sciences provides specialized laboratory facilities and analytical services to support research by university researchers and other academic institutions. Its activities include instrumental analysis, materials characterization, molecular and cellular studies, and the analysis of pharmaceutical, biological, food, and environmental samples. The laboratory is equipped with instruments such as atomic force microscopy (AFM), gas chromatography–mass spectrometry (GC–MS), atomic absorption spectroscopy (AAS), flow cytometry, real-time PCR, high-performance liquid chromatography (HPLC), and UV–visible spectrophotometry. Its services support research in areas including nanomaterials, chemical analysis, environmental pollutants, biological markers, gene expression, and pharmaceutical analysis. The laboratory also supports the development of laboratory quality-control systems and collaboration among research laboratories.

== Ranking ==
Ahvaz Jundishapur University of Medical Sciences Times Higher Education Ranking
Year	Total Participating	Global Rank	National Rank
2027	3146	801-1000	21 of 89
2026	3118	801-1000	23 of 101

Ahvaz Jundishapur University of Medical Sciences CWTS Leiden Ranking Traditional Edition
Year	Publications	Global Rank	National Rank
2025	1046	1333 of 1594	36 of 48
2024	1034	1271 of 1506	37 of 46

Ahvaz Jundishapur University of Medical Sciences CWTS Leiden Ranking Open Edition
Year	Publications	Global Rank	National Rank
2025	1725	1115 of 2773	26 of 82
2024	1735	1099 of 2766	25 of 82

UI GreenMetric World Ranking
Year	Global Rank
2025	1070 of 1745
2024	1033 of 1477
2023	736 of 1183
2022	698 of 1050

Ahvaz Jundishapur University of Medical Sciences SCImago
Year	Overall percentile	Research percentile	Innovation percentile	Societal percentile
2026	69th	46th	65th	77th

== Scientific journals ==
Sources:

- Jundishapur Journal of Microbiology
- Jundishapur Journal of Natural Pharmaceutical Products
- Jentashapir Journal of Cellular and Molecular Biology
- Jundishapur Journal of Chronic Disease Care
- Jundishapur Journal of Health Sciences
- Jundishapur Journal of Oncology
- Jundishapur Journal of Medical Sciences
- JundiShapur Educational Development
- The Journal of Telemedicine
