= University of Otago School of Pharmacy =

Coordinates: 45.868°S 170.508°E

Part of the University of Otago's Division of Health Sciences, the School of Pharmacy and Pharmacology is based in Dunedin, New Zealand. It is ranked in the world's top-200 universities for pharmacy and pharmacology.

== Undergraduate programmes ==
The School teaches the four-year Bachelor of Pharmacy (BPharm) and Bachelor of Pharmacy with Honours (BPharm(Hons)) programmes. Admission is competitive, usually following successful completion of the University's Health Sciences First Year programme.

The School has credit transfer agreements with Malaysia's International Medical University and multiple polytechnics in Singapore. These agreements can allow students to obtain an Otago Pharmacy degree in 2–3 years.

== Postgraduate programmes ==
The School offers the following postgraduate programmes:

- Postgraduate Certificate in Pharmacy
- Postgraduate Certificate in Pharmacy endorsed in Medicines Management
- Postgraduate Certificate in Pharmacy endorsed in Social Pharmacy
- Postgraduate Certificate in Pharmacist Prescribing
- Postgraduate Diploma in Clinical Pharmacy
- Master of Clinical Pharmacy
- PhD
