= Devinagar =

Devinagar देवीनगर
- Village development committee
- Location in Nepal
- Coordinates: 27.81°N 83.71°E
- Country: Nepal
- Province: Lumbini Province
- District: Palpa District

Population (1991)
  - Total: 200,000
- Time zone: UTC+5:45 (Nepal Time)

Devinagar is a village development committee in Palpa District in Lumbini Province of southern Nepal. At the time of the 1991 Nepal census it had a population of 3280 people living in 541 individual households.
