= Khabarovsk State Pharmaceutical Institute =

Higher education institute in Khabarovsk, Russia

- Хабаровский государственный фармацевтический институт
- Established: 1981
- Location: Khabarovsk, Russia
- Language: Russian

Khabarovsk State Pharmaceutical Institute (Russian: Хабаровский государственный фармацевтический институт) is a medical institution of higher education in Khabarovsk that existed from 1981 to 1994.

== History ==
The Khabarovsk State Pharmaceutical Institute was established in 1981 on the basis of the Faculty of Pharmacy of the Khabarovsk State Medical Institute in accordance with the Decree of the Council of Ministers of the RSFSR of 26 September 1980 No. 460 and the order of the Ministry of Health of the RSFSR of 4 November 1980 No. 587. The university was subordinate to the Ministry of Health of the RSFSR.

The institute included one full-time faculty, it was a higher education institution of the 3rd category, the main direction of the educational activity of this educational institution was the preparation of students in the specialty of pharmacy. The first enrollment of 250 students was held in the 1981/82 academic year. Also, from 1 September 1981, students of the 2nd and 3rd courses of the pharmaceutical faculty of the Khabarovsk State Medical Institute (now the Far Eastern State Medical University) were transferred to the medical institute. And on 2 February 1982, by a joint decision of the Regional Committee of the CPSU and the Regional Executive Committee, it was decided to transfer the former building of the institute and Khabarovskgrazhdanproekt to the Khabarovsk State Pharmaceutical Institute at the address: Amur Boulevard, 27.

The first and only rector of the institute was Candidate of Pharmaceutical Sciences, Associate Professor Dzhumaev Mels Annaevich (b. 1943). In addition to administrative and economic units, the Khabarovsk State Pharmaceutical Institute included:

Having worked until 1994, in accordance with the order of the Government of the Russian Federation of March 7, 1995 No. 230 and the order of the Ministry of Health of the Medical Industry of the Russian Federation of 26 April 1995 No. 109 "On the reorganization of the Khabarovsk State Pharmaceutical Institute and the Khabarovsk State Medical Institute", the pharmaceutical institute was reorganized by joining the medical Institute as its structural subdivision - Faculty of Pharmacy. The closure of the university was carried out by a special liquidation commission.

The State Archives of the Khabarovsk Territory contains documents related to the specified university.

== Departments ==
- Marxism–Leninism
- Physical education
- Foreign and Latin
- Physics, biophysics and higher mathematics
- Inorganic and physical colloid chemistry
- Analytical Chemistry
- Organic and biological chemistry
- Pharmacognosy and resource science of medicinal plants
- Botanists with biology
- Physiology with anatomy and pathology course
- Pharmaceutical and toxicological chemistry
- Technologies of dosage forms and biopharmacy
- Organizations and economics of pharmacy with courses in Soviet law and introduction to the specialty

== Courses ==
- Medical and pharmaceutical commodity science, hygiene, special training, civil defense, civil defense medical service
- Microbiology
- Pharmacology, pharmacotherapy and first aid

== Literature ==
- ЮБИЛЕЙНАЯ КНИГА 75 лет Дальневосточному государственному медицинскому университету (1930—2005 гг.)
