= University of Rhode Island College of Pharmacy =

Pharmacy school in Rhode Island

- URI College of Pharmacy
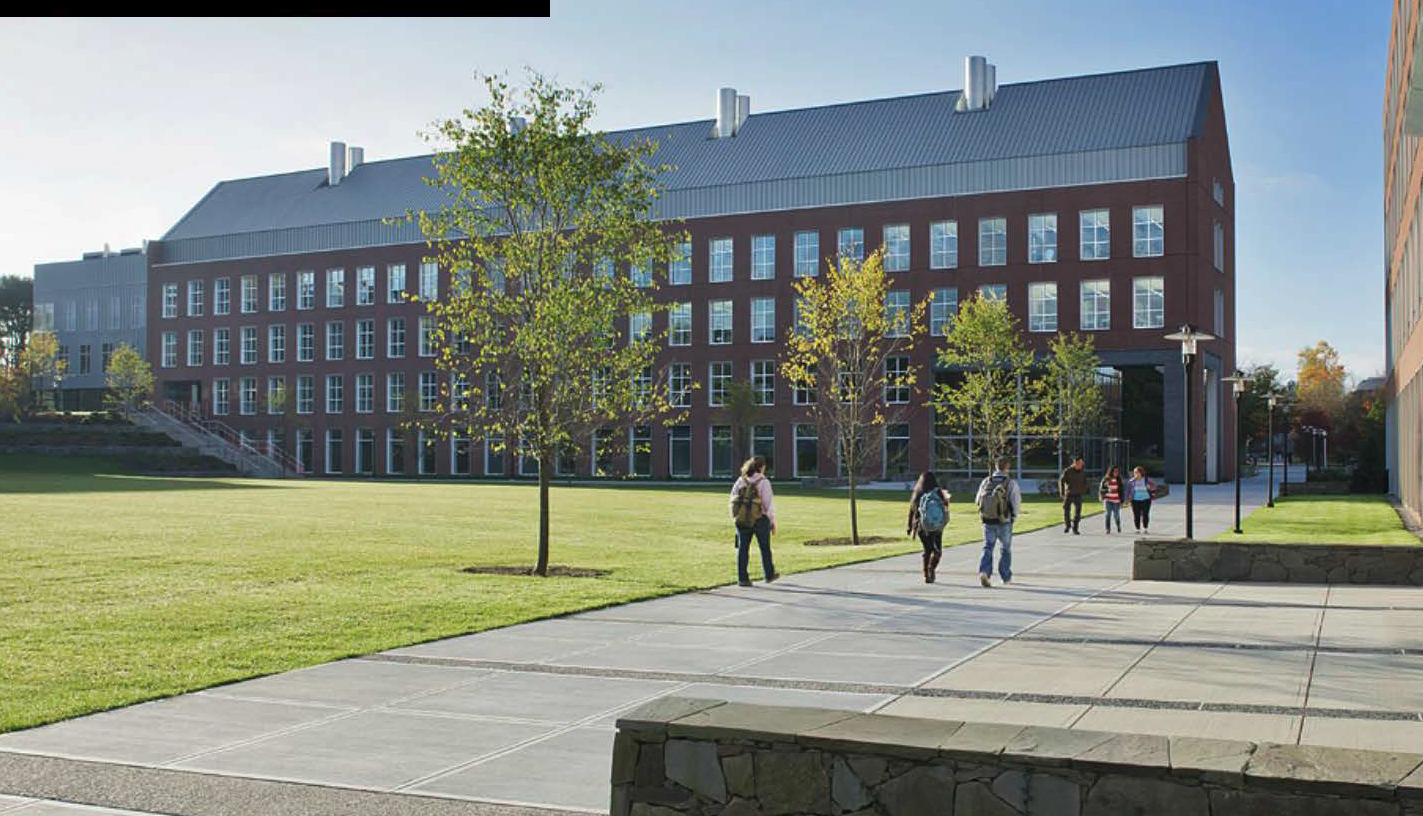
- Type: Public
- Established: 1902 as the Rhode Island College of Pharmacy and Allied Sciences; 1957 as the University of Rhode Island College of Pharmacy
- Parent institution: The University of Rhode Island (URI)
- Affiliations: Advance-CTR programs; George and Anne Ryan Institute for Neuroscience (GARIN); Institute for Integrated Health and Innovation (IIHI); Rhode Island State Crime Laboratory; Pharmaceutical Development Institute (PDI)
- Dean: Kerry LaPlante
- Location: Avedisian Hall, 7 Greenhouse Road, Kingston, RI 02881
- Campus: 145,000 ft^{2} (13,500 m^{2}); Rural
- Website: web.uri.edu/pharmacy/

The University of Rhode Island, College of Pharmacy is a pharmacy school located in the URI’s Kingston campus in southern Rhode Island, United States. Founded in 1902 as the Rhode Island College of Pharmacy and Allied Sciences in Providence, Rhode Island, the College relocated to the University of Rhode Island in Kingston in 1957.

== History ==
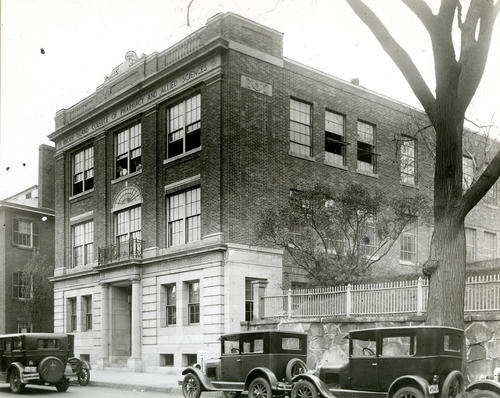
Benefit Street 1920s

In the early 1870s, the first pharmacy classes were taking place in Rhode Island which resulted in the creation of the Rhode Island College of Pharmacy and Allied Sciences in 1902 that operated in Providence, RI through 1957. The first class included 21 students with 2 being female. In 1955, the College’s trustees and pharmacy leaders throughout the state felt an affiliation with the state university would be helpful, and established the College of Pharmacy at URI in 1956, with a final approval granted by the Rhode Island General Assembly. The school was transferred to the University of Rhode Island’s (URI) Kingston Campus and opened its doors in 1957.

The initial home for the College was Pastore Hall and Ranger Hall on the Kingston campus. In 1960, the same year that the College instituted the five-year bachelor’s degree, Rhode Island voters approved a $1.5 million bond referendum (equivalent to $12.2 million in 2024) for a new pharmacy and nursing building. Fogarty Hall was initially designed to accommodate 150 students and 10 faculty members. By 2000, the facility hosted 700 students and 40 faculty. Recognizing Fogarty space constraints, a bond proposal for $65 million (equivalent to $97 million in 2024) for a new pharmacy building to be part of a new health and life sciences district in the northern portion of the Kingston Campus was approved in 2006. This 145,000-square-foot (13,500 m^{2}) facility was named for, and dedicated to, Paramaz Avedisian in 2017.

In 2014, Thomas M. Ryan, a 1975 pharmacy graduate and the former chairman, president and CEO of CVS Caremark, and his wife, Cathy, made the largest private donation in URI’s history to establish the George & Anne Ryan Institute for Neuroscience.

By 2020, the College was home to 767 Doctor of Pharmacy students and 136 Bachelors and 56 graduate students in the pharmaceutical sciences, with a student-to-faculty ratio of 12:1. In addition to the Pharm.D. program, allowing students to complete the degree just six years after graduating high school, the College also offers Master’s and Ph.D. programs, as well as a Bachelor of Science in Pharmaceutical Sciences.

== Reputation ==
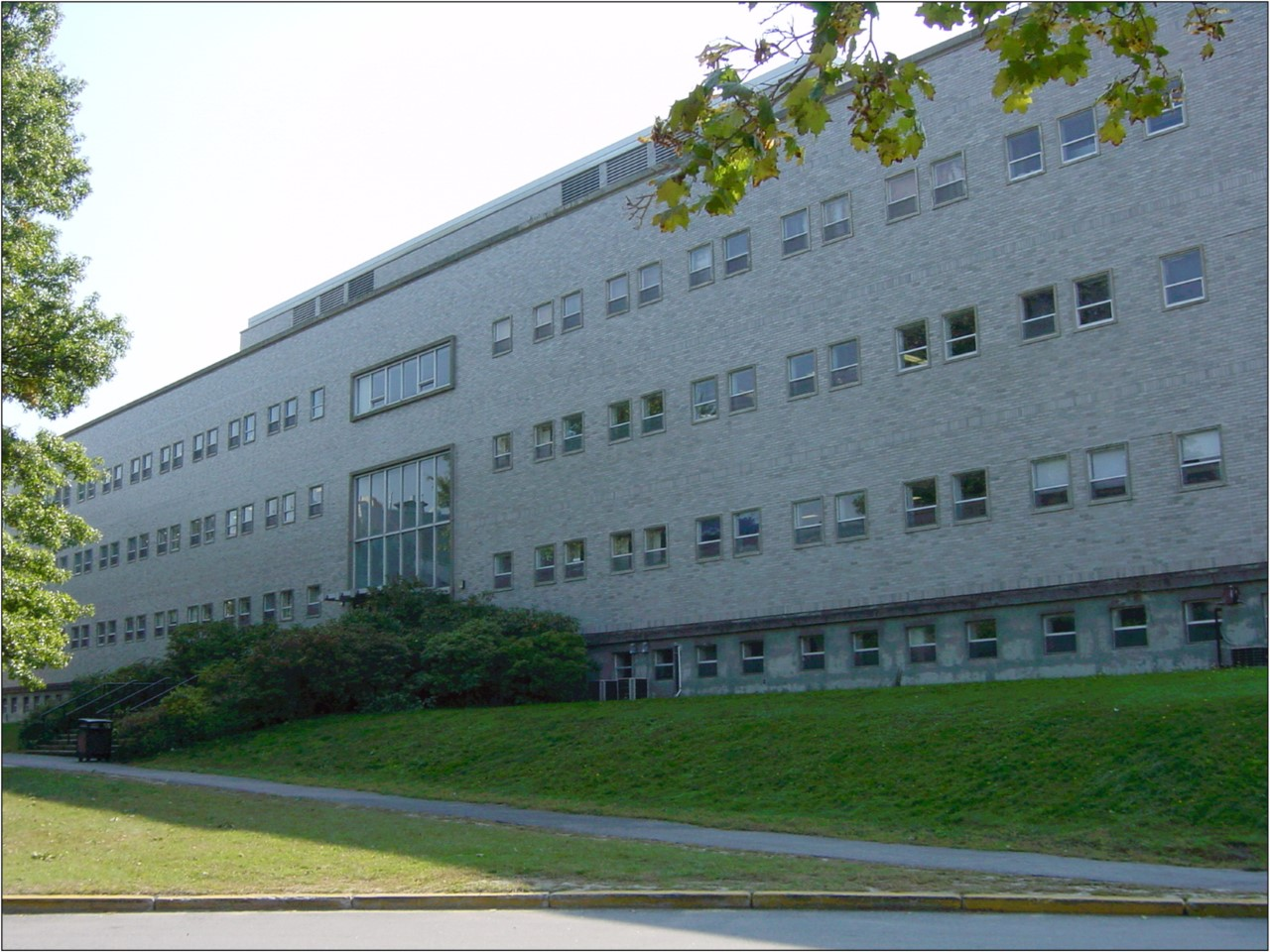
Fogarty Hall

The College’s program has achieved its highest ranking to date, now standing at number 31 out of 141 pharmacy colleges in the United States. In the 2026 rankings by U.S. News & World Report. The University of Rhode Island was also ranked the number one public university in New England by The Wall Street Journal in 2026. The University additionally joined the top level of research universities, earning R1 designation in the latest Carnegie Classification of Institutions of Higher Education, a distinction held by only 4.8% of degree-granting postsecondary institutions nationally. As of FY2026, the College reported the highest postgraduate residency match total in New England, with an 87.9% first-year residency placement rate and a 100% second-year placement rate, and a first-time pass rate of 91.8% on the North American Pharmacist Licensure Examination (NAPLEX), according to the National Association of Boards of Pharmacy.

== Departments ==
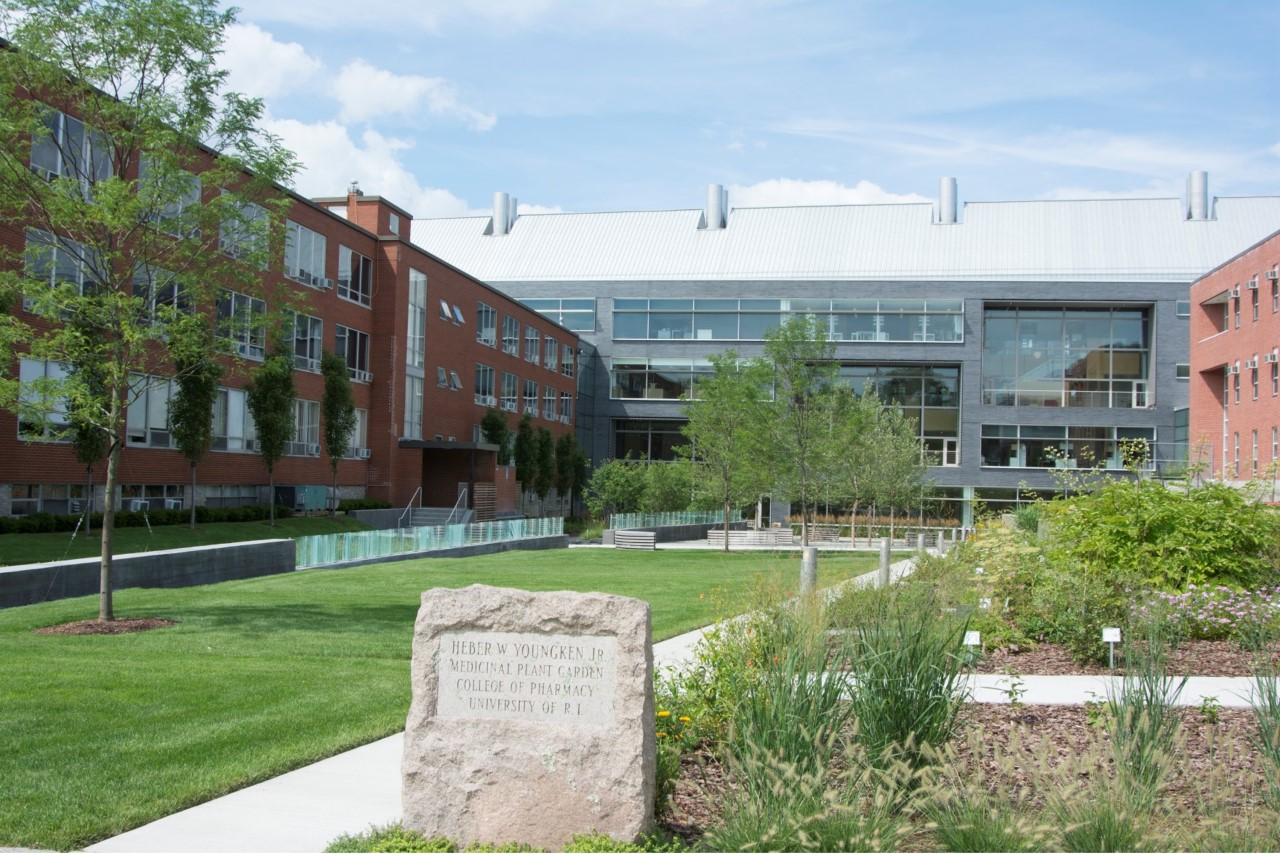
HMY Medical Gardens

The College of Pharmacy consists of two major departments organized around different areas of the pharmaceutical sciences.

- Department of Biomedical and Pharmaceutical Sciences (BPS)
- Department of Pharmacy Practice (PHP)

The Rhode Island State Crime Laboratory is also part of the College.

== Research ==
In 2016, the College of Pharmacy’s research awards exceeded $6.5 million (equivalent to $8.3 million in 2024). In 2020, the college's total reportable research federal funding was $15 million (equivalent to $17.9 million in 2024). In 2023, the College’s extensive research is funded by over $21 million in extramural grants, research awards and industry partnerships.

== Notable alumni ==
- Thomas M. Ryan – Former Chair and CEO of CVS/Health
- Ernest Mario – Former CEO and Chair, Glaxo Pharmaceuticals, ALZA Corp.
- Hubert Humphrey – former Vice President of the United States (honorary degree)
