= University of Montenegro Faculty of Pharmacy =

Educational institution at the University of Montenegro

- Farmaceutski fakultet Univerziteta Crne Gore
- Type: Public
- Established: 2007
- Affiliations: University of Montenegro
- Dean: Refik Zejnilović
- Location: Podgorica, Montenegro; 42.436594°N 19.244565°E
- Campus: Urban
- Website: www.farmacija.ac.me

The University of Montenegro Faculty of Pharmacy (Montenegrin: Farmaceutski fakultet Univerziteta Crne Gore Фармацеутски факултет Универзитета Црне Горе) is one of the educational institutions of the University of Montenegro. The Faculty is located in Podgorica, in a building shared with the Faculty of Medicine.

== History ==
In 2007, the Independent Study Programme Pharmacy (Montenegrin: Samostalni studijski program Farmacija) was officially established, and the first students started their teaching courses on October 3, 2007 - the date which is now celebrated as the Day of the Faculty. The Independent Study Programme Pharmacy was upgraded and officially transformed into the Pharmaceutical Faculty in 2010.

== Organization ==
The undergraduate studies at the Faculty last ten semesters (five years). No courses of studies have been planned at this study group, but the students can choose electives, in compliance with their affinities, thus orienting themselves towards particular disciplines.
