= Al-Isra University =

Private university in Jordan

Isra University
- جامعة الإسراء
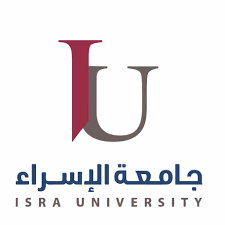
- Type: Private
- Established: 1989
- Affiliations: IAU, FUIW, AArU
- President: Prof.Dr. Mohammad Hamed
- Location: Amman, Jordan; 31.789°N 35.929°E
- Campus: Urban 3 square kilometres (740 acres)
- Language: Arabic
- Colors: Steel Blue and Lavender
- Website: Isra University website

Isra University (Arabic: جامعة الإسراء) is a private university in Amman, Jordan. It was established in 1989, the first scholastic year started in fall 1991. The university offers the Bachelor of Science (B.Sc) degree in thirty two majors in ten different faculties, and twelve Master's programs (M.Sc) The university started receiving the first batch of students in the educational fields in 1991/1992.

The University currently has international students from over 53 countries around the world. With over 32,800 graduated students.

== See also ==
- List of Islamic educational institutions
