= Clinical scientist =

Clinical scientist may refer to:

- Biomedical scientist
- Clinical laboratory scientist
- Healthcare scientist
- Physician-scientist

== See also ==
- Clinical pathologist
- Clinical biologist
- Medical laboratory
