= Var's 7th constituency =

Constituency of the National Assembly of France

7th constituency of Var
- inline Constituency of the National Assembly of France

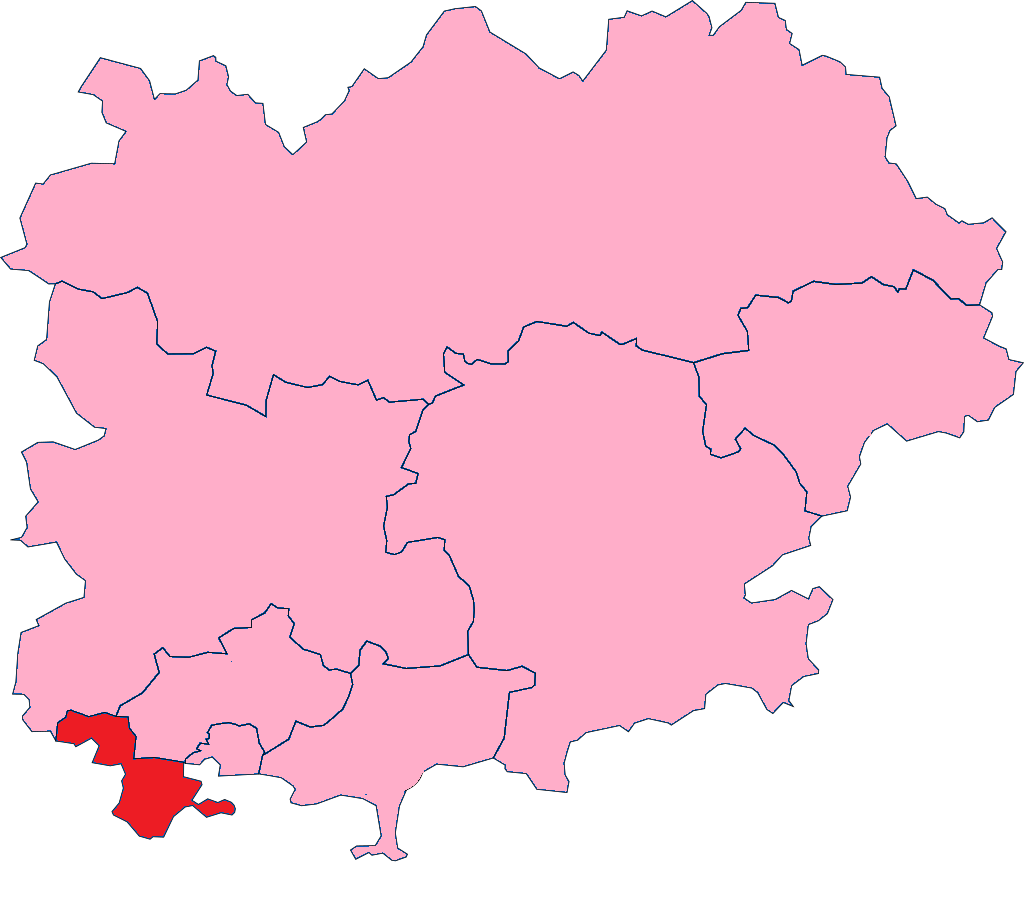
- Var's 7th Constituency shown within the Var
- Deputy: Isabelle Delyon; RN
- Department: Var
- Cantons: Saint-Mandrier-sur-Mer, La Seyne-sur-Mer, Six-Fours-les-Plages, communes of Sanary-sur-Mer and Bandol
- Registered voters: 103,503

The 7th constituency of the Var (French: Septième circonscription du Var) is a French legislative constituency in the Var département. Like the other 576 French constituencies, it elects one MP using the two-round system, with a run-off if no candidate receives over 50% of the vote in the first round.

== Description ==
The 7th constituency of the Var lies in the south west of the department and includes the town La Seyne-sur-Mer opposite Toulon's harbour.

In common with other seats in the department this constituency had a tradition of voting for centre right candidates until 2017 when it swung behind Emmanuel Macron's centrist coalition.

== Assembly Members ==
| Election | Member | Party |
|---|---|---|
| 1988 | Arthur Paecht | UDF |
| 1993 | Arthur Paecht | UDF |
| 1997 | Arthur Paecht | RPR |
| 2002 | Jean-Sébastien Vialatte | UMP |
| 2007 | Jean-Sébastien Vialatte | UMP |
| 2012 | Jean-Sébastien Vialatte | UMP |
| 2017 | Émilie Guerel | LREM |
| 2022 | Frédéric Boccaletti | RN |

== Election results ==
=== 2024 ===
Legislative Election 2024: Var's 7th constituency
| Party | Candidate | Votes | % | ±% |
|---|---|---|---|---|
| LR | Sandra Kuntz | 5,129 | 7.56 | −3.64 |
| RE (Ensemble) | Cécile Muschotti | 12,567 | 18.53 | −8.09 |
| DIV | Marie-Ève Perru | 819 | 1.21 | n/a |
| LO | Patrice Ciuti | 381 | 0.56 | n/a |
| LÉ–EELV (NFP) | Claudine Cartereau | 1,169 | 1.72 | n/a |
| RN | Frédéric Boccaletti | 32,748 | 48.30 | +19.60 |
| ÉAC | Laurile Koscielski | 1,169 | 1.72 | n/a |
| DLF | Christèle Gueniot-Desmazures | 71 | 0.10 | n/a |
| DIV | Sébastien Gioia | 1,870 | 2.76 | n/a |
| REC | Mathieu Reho | 887 | 1.31 | −8.21 |
| Turnout | | 67,807 | 98.14 | +53.74 |
| Registered electors | | 103,766 | | |
2nd round result
| RN | Frédéric Boccaletti | 36,043 | 55.81 | +3.76 |
| RE | Cécile Muschotti | 28,544 | 44.19 | −3.76 |
| Turnout | | 64,587 | 95.44 | +51.99 |
| Registered electors | | 703,771 | | |
| RN hold | | | | |

=== 2022 ===
Legislative Election 2022: Var's 7th constituency
| Party | Candidate | Votes | % | ±% |
|---|---|---|---|---|
| RN | Frédéric Boccaletti | 13,185 | 28.70 | +4.84 |
| LREM (Ensemble) | Cécile Muschotti | 12,226 | 26.62 | -4.93 |
| GE (NUPÉS) | Basma Bouchkara | 6,830 | 14.87 | −0.39 |
| LR (UDC) | Romain Vincent | 5,145 | 11.20 | −7.96 |
| REC | Charles Iannessi | 4,371 | 9.52 | N/A |
| PS | Bouchra Reano* | 972 | 2.12 | N/A |
| Others | N/A | 3,207 | 6.98 | |
| Turnout | | 45,936 | 44.40 | +0.52 |
2nd round result
| RN | Frédéric Boccaletti | 22,311 | 52.05 | +9.02 |
| LREM (Ensemble) | Cécile Muschotti | 20,557 | 47.95 | −9.02 |
| Turnout | | 42,868 | 43.45 | +7.89 |
| RN gain from LREM | | | | |

* PS dissident, not supported by NUPES alliance.

=== 2017 ===
Legislative Election 2017: Var's 7th constituency
| Party | Candidate | Votes | % | ±% |
|---|---|---|---|---|
| LREM | Émilie Guerel | 14,330 | 31.55 | |
| FN | Frédéric Boccaletti | 10,838 | 23.86 | |
| LR | Jean-Sébastien Vialatte | 8,658 | 19.06 | |
| LFI | Laurent Richard | 4,665 | 10.27 | |
| DVD | Jean-Pierre Colin | 1,669 | 3.67 | |
| EELV | Denise Reverdito Nee Ortigue | 1,358 | 2.99 | |
| PCF | Janine Lecler | 910 | 2.00 | |
| Others | N/A | 2,988 | | |
| Turnout | | 45,416 | 43.88 | |
2nd round result
| LREM | Émilie Guerel | 20,967 | 56.97 | |
| FN | Frédéric Boccaletti | 15,838 | 43.03 | |
| Turnout | | 36,805 | 35.56 | |
| LREM gain from LR | | | | |

=== 2012 ===
Legislative Election 2012: Var's 7th constituency
| Party | Candidate | Votes | % | ±% |
|---|---|---|---|---|
| UMP | Jean-Sébastien Vialatte | 19,236 | 34.37 | |
| DVG | Ladislas Polski | 15,266 | 27.27 | |
| FN | Frédéric Boccaletti | 13,008 | 23.24 | |
| DVD | Arthur Paecht | 2,695 | 4.81 | |
| FG | Christine Sampéré | 2,541 | 4.54 | |
| Others | N/A | 3,226 | | |
| Turnout | | 55,972 | 55.29 | |
2nd round result
| UMP | Jean-Sébastien Vialatte | 23,705 | 41.65 | |
| DVG | Ladislas Polski | 19,976 | 35.10 | |
| FN | Frédéric Boccaletti | 13,234 | 23.25 | |
| Turnout | | 56,915 | 56.23 | |
| UMP hold | | | | |

=== 2007 ===
Legislative Election 2007: Var's 7th constituency
| Party | Candidate | Votes | % | ±% |
|---|---|---|---|---|
| UMP | Jean-Sébastien Vialatte | 31,302 | 51.10 | |
| PRG | Laroussi Oueslati | 8,042 | 13.13 | |
| MoDem | Ferdinand Bernhard | 6,712 | 10.96 | |
| FN | Joël Houvet | 4,168 | 6.80 | |
| DVG | Patrick Martinenq | 2,447 | 3.99 | |
| PCF | Philippe Mignoni | 2,324 | 3.79 | |
| Far left | Joëlle Arnal | 1,514 | 2.47 | |
| LV | Hélène D'Ortoli | 1,223 | 2.00 | |
| Others | N/A | 3,529 | | |
| Turnout | | 62,231 | 57.69 | |
| UMP hold | | | | |

=== 2002 ===
Legislative Election 2002: Var's 7th constituency
| Party | Candidate | Votes | % | ±% |
|---|---|---|---|---|
| UMP | Jean-Sébastien Vialatte | 21,327 | 35.08 | |
| FN | Michel de Maynard | 11,479 | 18.88 | |
| PS | Mireille Peirano | 11,102 | 18.26 | |
| DL | Ferdinand Bernhard | 8,882 | 14.61 | |
| PCF | Jean-Pierre Meyer | 2,380 | 3.91 | |
| Others | N/A | 5,626 | | |
| Turnout | | 61,811 | 61.10 | |
2nd round result
| UMP | Jean-Sébastien Vialatte | 33,792 | 71.54 | |
| FN | Michel de Maynard | 13,442 | 28.46 | |
| Turnout | | 52,758 | 52.16 | |
| UMP gain from UDF | | | | |

=== 1997 ===
Legislative Election 1997: Var's 7th constituency
| Party | Candidate | Votes | % | ±% |
|---|---|---|---|---|
| UDF | Arthur Paecht | 15,402 | 27.47 | |
| FN | Jean-Claude Pons | 14,920 | 26.61 | |
| PS | Mireille Peirano | 8,265 | 14.74 | |
| PCF | Philippe Arcamone | 6,495 | 11.59 | |
| DIV | Patrick Martinenq | 2,451 | 4.37 | |
| LV | Elise Beltrame | 1,568 | 2.80 | |
| Others | N/A | 6,958 | | |
| Turnout | | 58,286 | 60.35 | |
2nd round result
| UDF | Arthur Paecht | 35,576 | 65.85 | |
| FN | Jean-Claude Pons | 18,453 | 34.15 | |
| Turnout | | 60,770 | 62.93 | |
| UDF hold | | | | |
