= Clinical pharmaceutical scientist =

Scientist specializing in pharmaceutical sciences

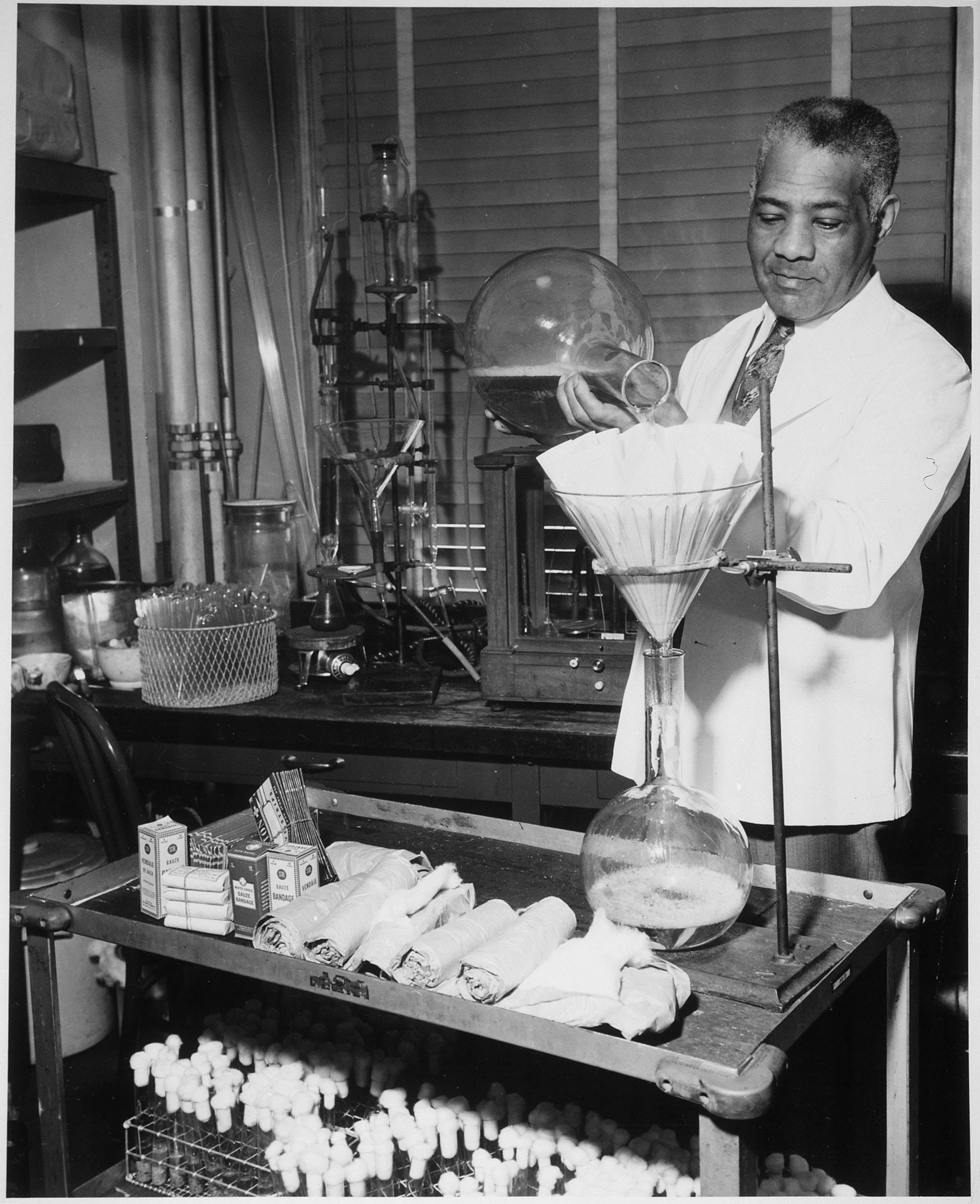

Occupation
- Names: pharmacist-scientist, apothecary-scientist
- Occupation type: profession
- Activity sectors: academia, industry, government (including regulators), healthcare

Description
- Competencies: Translational medicine, independent research skills, pharmacy practice, residency or fellowship training
- Education required: Doctor of Pharmacy, often with an academic research certificate, master's or doctorate degree
- Related jobs: scientist, pharmacist, physician-scientist

A clinical pharmaceutical scientist (or pharmacist-scientist) is a licensed, practicing pharmacist who also functions as an independent researcher in the pharmaceutical sciences. Clinical pharmaceutical scientists are a type of clinician scientist, analogous to physician-scientists.

== Terminology ==
The term clinical pharmaceutical scientist is distinct from the term pharmaceutical scientist, in that a clinical pharmaceutical scientist is a practicing clinical pharmacist involved in science relating to the discovery and/or development of pharmaceuticals, the development of new knowledge improving the use of pharmaceuticals in clinical practice, or any other subfield of pharmaceutical science (e.g. pharmacoeconomics, pharmacokinetics, outcomes research), while a pharmaceutical scientist need not also be a clinician (pharmacist). Thus, all clinical pharmaceutical scientists are pharmaceutical scientists, but not all pharmaceutical scientists are clinical pharmaceutical scientists.

Clinical pharmaceutical scientists are both practicing pharmacists and clinical pharmacologists.

== History ==
=== Modern conceptualization ===
Most sources attribute the origination of the term "clinical pharmaceutical scientist" to the 1973–1975 Millis Study Commission on Pharmacy (often referred to simply as the "Millis Commission"). The Millis Commission was so-named after Dr. John (Jack) S. Millis, the commission's chairman. The Millis Commission was tasked with examining the place of pharmacists in the American healthcare system, the state of professional pharmacy education at the time, and the prevalence of prescription drug misuse. The Millis Commission recommended "training skilled pharmacy practitioners in research to increase the number and variety of clinical pharmacists," who were "equally skilled and trained in a science and in pharmacy practice", but did not go as far as to explicitly define the term "clinical pharmaceutical scientist" or its educational requirements. Since the Millis Commission, multiple sources have conceptualized clinical pharmaceutical scientists. The 2003 edition of the Encyclopedia of Clinical Pharmacy defines the clinical pharmaceutical scientist as the following:

A clinical pharmaceutical scientist is an independent investigator with education and training in pharmacotherapeutics who utilizes contemporary research approaches to generate new knowledge relevant to drug behavior in humans, to therapeutic interventions, and/or to patient outcomes.

=== Notable clinical pharmaceutical scientists ===
The history of pharmacy contains numerous individuals that dabbled in both clinical pharmacy practice and pharmaceutical science. Many major scientific discoveries in pharmacology were by pharmacists, acting as clinical pharmaceutical scientists (although not necessarily recognized by that term). For example, Friedrich Sertürner was a German pharmacist who discovered and isolated the opiate morphine from opium in 1805.

The American Pharmacy (1852–2002): A Collection of Historical Essays contains a comprehensive history of American pharmacy from the late modern period to the contemporary era. In his essay The Pharmaceutical Science in America, 1852–1902, John Parascandola writes:

Unlike Europe, the United States has never produced practicing pharmacist-scientists of the caliber of Carl Scheele or Joseph Pierre Pelletier, who made important discoveries in the laboratories associated with their pharmacies. It should be noted, however, that the sciences were becoming increasingly specialized by the second half of the 19th century, and the tradition of the apothecary-scientist was on the wane even in Europe by this time.

== Education and training ==
=== Requirements ===
A clinical pharmaceutical scientist must have education in both clinical pharmacy and research. Broadly, the clinical pharmaceutical scientist's clinical knowledge is centered around expertise pertaining to pharmacotherapy, with less emphasis on diagnostic skills and nonpharmacologic therapies (e.g. surgery). Clinical pharmaceutical scientists must possess expertise in the pharmaceutical sciences and in the management of drug therapy problems.

To achieve this expertise, clinical pharmaceutical scientists typically pursue education after their professional pharmacy degrees (in the United States, a PharmD is generally a prerequisite). This can involve a 2–3 year postdoctoral fellowship or pursuing graduate degrees (e.g. MS, PhD). Postdoctoral programs tend to emphasize a specific area of pharmaceutical science for the scientist to specialize in, such as pharmacoepidemiology or pharmacogenetics.

Postdoctoral residency training is generally recommended, though is not a prerequisite, for most fellowship programs.

Some programs offer combined PharmD-PhD training. While praised as convenient, time saving, and for growing clinical pharmaceutical science, there has also been concern that the intense requirements of graduate research may take precedence over the clinical curriculum and internship/clerkship opportunities of PharmD training. As one candidate wrote in Pharmacy Times, the duration of combined PharmD-PhD programs can vary, usually lasting 7–8 years in total.

According to Robert Powell, PharmD, of the Center for Drug Evaluation and Research (a division of the FDA), pharmacists may serve as principal investigators (PI's) on clinical trials for investigational new drug applications in the United States, provided that they meet the same requirements that every other PI must meet.

=== Comparison ===
There are multiple postdoctoral pathways to entering a career as a clinical pharmaceutical scientist. The pathways tend to vary by the time required and the depth of training, with programs of longer duration providing more extensive training.

The shortest program is a graduate certificate in clinical pharmaceutical research, which tend to last one year. These programs provide graduates with the ability to conduct clinical research, though not necessarily design it as principal investigators. Due to the short duration of these programs, there is less time to develop independent research skills.

Master's degree programs in clinical pharmaceutical research typically last 2–3 years, placing more emphasis on designing clinical trials.

Fellowship training can also last 2–3 years, though the training is thought to place more emphasis on independence. Because fellowship training can occur in non-academic environments, fellowships can also prepare individuals to begin careers in the pharmaceutical industry or with federal regulators. Fellowships do not have a didactic curriculum, and can involve additional clinical responsibilities.

The longest program is a Doctor of Philosophy (PhD) in clinical pharmaceutical research, which can last about 4–5 years. The goals of PhD programs are the same as fellowship training, though the added time provides an even greater depth in a research area of interest, in addition to supplemental didactic curriculum. PhD programs generally do not mandate any clinical responsibilities, though the University of Pittsburgh School of Pharmacy piloted the addition of a clinical component for their PhD clinical pharmaceutical scientist program.

== Careers ==
=== Industry ===
Within the pharmaceutical industry, clinical pharmaceutical scientists can pursue careers as "clinical research officers," also known as "project managers." In these roles, clinical pharmaceutical scientists are intimately involved with designing, conducting, and consulting on clinical trials by pharmaceutical companies. Postdoctoral pharmacy fellowships with pharmaceutical industry sponsors are traditional gateways for pharmacists to enter the industry. Careers for clinical pharmaceutical scientists within the pharmaceutical industry often involve less clinical work, and are more business and/or research intensive. Clinical pharmaceutical scientists work in the areas of drug discovery, drug formulation optimization and pharmacokinetics, pharmacoeconomics, labeling and regulatory compliance, and post-marketing research.

=== Academia ===
Clinical pharmaceutical scientists working in academia must have expertise in what the American Pharmacists Association calls the "three legs" of academia: scholarship (research), teaching, and service (clinical practice and professional development activities). Clinical pharmaceutical scientists have expertise in both research and clinical pharmacy, which is conducive to a career that demands those skills. The Commission on the Future of Graduate Education in the Pharmaceutical Sciences, appointed in 1996 by the American Association of Colleges of Pharmacy (AACP), has recommended that more American pharmacy schools develop combined PharmD/PhD programs to train clinical pharmaceutical scientists. The AACP Educating Clinical Scientists Task Force has recommended that clinical practice be combined with teaching assistantship for first-year students in clinical pharmaceutical science programs. This would effectively prepare them for all three domains of academia identified by the American Pharmacists Association above.

=== Government ===
In the United States, clinical pharmaceutical scientists can work as researchers for governmental agencies, such as the Food and Drug Administration and the National Institute of Health.

=== Private sector ===
Clinical pharmaceutical scientists working in the community setting face unique challenges. The private sector is focused on individual profitability, rather than performing academic research and disseminating knowledge for the profession itself. This applies to both (non-academic affiliated) hospital and community/retail pharmacy practice, where time and funding constraints limit opportunities for individual research.

== Research scope ==
The research scope of clinical pharmaceutical scientists can be broken into the fields of preclinical, clinical, outcomes, and translational research, with translation research representing the middle ground between preclinical and clinical research. Subjects of interest to clinical pharmaceutical scientists in their respective field may involve the following:

Preclinical research

- Pharmacokinetics/pharmacodynamics/pharmacogenomics
- Drug delivery
- Drug development (de novo drug development, as well as repurposing drugs for novel indications)
- Pharmacology, including research aimed at elucidating mechanisms of action
- Assay development

Clinical research

- Clinical research projects, including serving as principal investigators
- Researching nuances in clinical practice

Translational research

- "Translating" research, from "bench to bedside"

Outcomes research

- Pharmacoeconomics
- Public health outcomes
- Health policy research
- Pharmacy practice research

== Duties ==
The duties of clinical pharmaceutical scientists can be broadly divided into two categories: scientific and clinical duties:

Scientific duties

- Grant writing
- Research ethics
- Independent research
- Dissemination of knowledge

Clinical duties

- Interdisciplinary practice
- Clinical pharmacy practice

== Sources ==
- Blouin, Robert A.; Cloyd, James C.; Ludden, Thomas M.; Kroboth, Patricia D. (1991). "Central Issues Relevant to Clinical Pharmaceutical Scientist Training Programs". Pharmacotherapy. 11 (3): 257–263. doi:10.1002/j.1875-9114.1991.tb02637.x. PMID 1862017. S2CID 44827608.
- Kroboth, Patricia D.; Poloyac, Samuel M.; Matzke, Gary R. (2003). Encyclopedia of Clinical Pharmacy. New York, NY: Marcel Dekker, Inc. ISBN 978-0-8247-0752-1.
- The Millis Study Commission on Pharmacy: A Roadmap to a Profession's Future. Binghamton, NY: Pharmaceutical Products Press. 2006-02-17. ISBN 978-0-7890-2425-1.
- Parascandola, John (2005), "The Pharmaceutical Sciences in America, 1852–1902", in Higby, Gregory; Stroud, Elaine Condouris (eds.), American Pharmacy (1852–2002): A Collection of Historical Essays, ISBN 978-0931292392
- The Report of the Study Commission on Pharmacy. Ann Arbor, Michigan: Health Administration Press. 1975. pp. 123–125.
