= Biological pharmacist =

Medical profession

In France and in other countries like Portugal, Spain, Belgium or Switzerland, a Biological pharmacist (called Pharmacien biologiste in France) is a Pharmacist specialized in Clinical Biology a speciality similar to Clinical Pathology. They have almost the same rights as Medical Doctors specialized in this discipline. They both are called a "Clinical biologist"".

These Pharm.D. follow a "post-graduate" formation in hospital's medical laboratories.

In France, this specialization called "Internat de Biologie médicale" is a residency and lasts fours years after the five undergraduate years common to all pharmacists.

== See also ==
- Pathology
- Medical laboratory
- Anatomic pathology
- Medical technologist
- Veterinary pathology
- Clinical Biologist
