= Anthony Brosse =

French politician (born 1980)

Member of the National Assembly for Loiret's 5th constituency
- Incumbent
- Assumed office 22 June 2022
- Preceded by: Marianne Dubois

Personal details
- Born: 4 November 1980 (age 45) Saint-Calais, Sarthe, France
- Party: Renaissance

Anthony Brosse (born 4 November 1980) is a French politician of Renaissance who has been a Member of the National Assembly for Loiret's 5th constituency since 2022.

== See also ==
- List of deputies of the 16th National Assembly of France
