= Isabelle Delyon =

French politician (born 1955)

Member of the National Assembly for Var's 7th constituency
- Incumbent
- Assumed office 10 November 2026
- Preceded by: Frédéric Boccaletti
- Parliamentary group: RN

Deputy Mayor of La Seyne-sur-Mer
- In office 28 March 2026 – 10 November 2026

Member of the Regional Council of Bourgogne-Franche-Comté
- In office 4 January 2016 – 2 July 2021
- President: Marie-Guite Dufay

Personal details
- Born: 3 August 1955 (age 71) Giessen
- Occupation: chartered accountant, politician

Isabelle Delyon (born 3 August 1955 in Giessen) is a French chartered accountant and politician of the National Rally (RN). She has been a member of the National Assembly for Var's 7th constituency since 10 November 2026.

== Biography ==
Isabelle Delyon was born on 3 August 1955.

From 2016 to 2021 she was a National Front member of the Regional Council of Bourgogne-Franche-Comté. She was elected in the 2015 regional election.

In March 2026 she became deputy mayor of La Seyne-sur-Mer under mayor Dorian Munoz.

She was the substitute (suppléante) for Frédéric Boccaletti in the 2024 French legislative election. Boccaletti was elected mayor of Six-Fours-les-Plages in March 2026, and she replaced him in the National Assembly on 10 November 2026.
