= Cécile Muschotti =

French politician

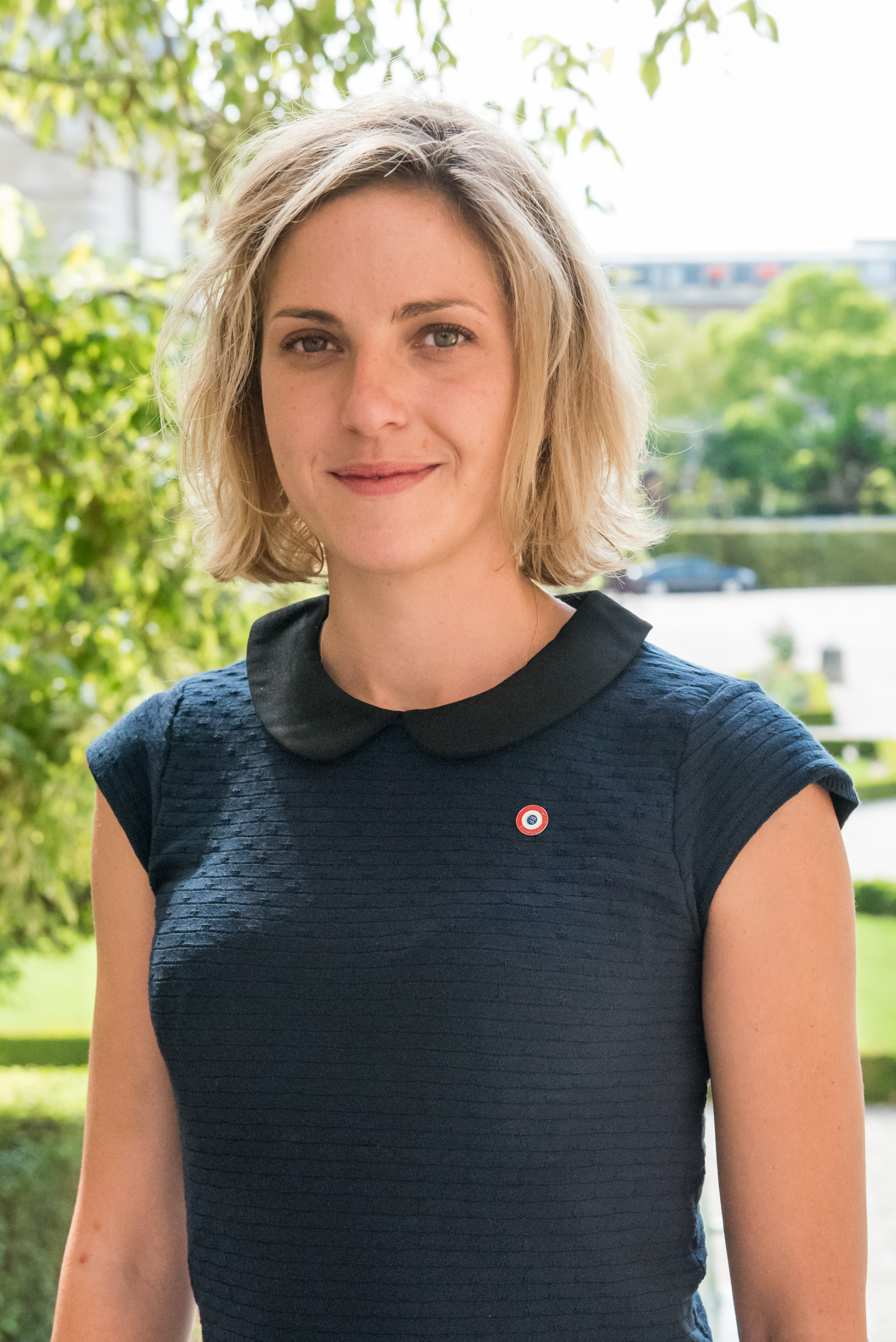

Member of the French National Assembly for Var's 2nd constituency
- In office 21 June 2017 – 21 June 2022
- Preceded by: Philippe Vitel
- Succeeded by: Laure Lavalette

Personal details
- Born: 30 October 1987 (age 38) Toulon, France
- Party: En Marche!

Cécile Muschotti is a French politician who has been serving as a member of the National Assembly from 2017 to 2022, representing the 2nd district of Var.

In parliament, Muschotti serves as member of the Committee on Cultural Affairs and Education.

In 2020, Muschotti joined En commun (EC), a group within LREM led by Barbara Pompili.
