= Jean-Paul Charié =

French politician

Jean-Paul Charié (25 April 1952, Égry - 3 November 2009) was a member of the National Assembly of France. He represented the 5th constituency in the Loiret department from 1988 to 2009, and was a member of the Union for a Popular Movement.

When he died, he was succeeded by Marianne Dubois.

== Biography ==
Jean-Paul Charié was born on April 25, 1952, in Égry, a commune located in the north of the French department of Loiret and the natural region of Gâtinais. He is the son of resistance fighter and politician Pierre Charié.

He was elected deputy on June 21, 1981, in the Loiret's 5th constituency, where his father had served between 1958 and 1973, succeeding Gaston Girard. He entered the National Assembly on July 2, 1981, where he was the youngest member at 29 years old. A member of the Rassemblement pour la République (RPR) and then the Union pour un mouvement populaire (UMP) parties, he was re-elected continuously until his death.

Aspiring to establish himself locally in the town of Pithiviers, as mayor or general councilor, he never managed to gain a foothold there, being systematically defeated in municipal and cantonal elections.

He was the rapporteur for the 2008 Economic Modernization Act, which dealt with the reform of commercial urban planning. It was in this spirit that he supported the creation of the Institute for Cities and Commerce in 2009.

In his Blue Book on Lobbying in France, lamenting its poor image in the public eye, Jean-Paul Charié advocates for a revaluation of Advocacy group in France, an activity he considers useful and even indispensable to the proper functioning of a democracy and necessary for a country's “performance,” taking the United States and the United Kingdom as models.

He died on November 3, 2009, and was replaced by his deputy, Marianne Dubois.

Jean-Paul Charié est le père de deux enfants, Romain et Anne-Carole.
