= Loiret's 5th constituency =

Constituency of the National Assembly of France

5th constituency of Loiret
- inline Constituency of the National Assembly of France

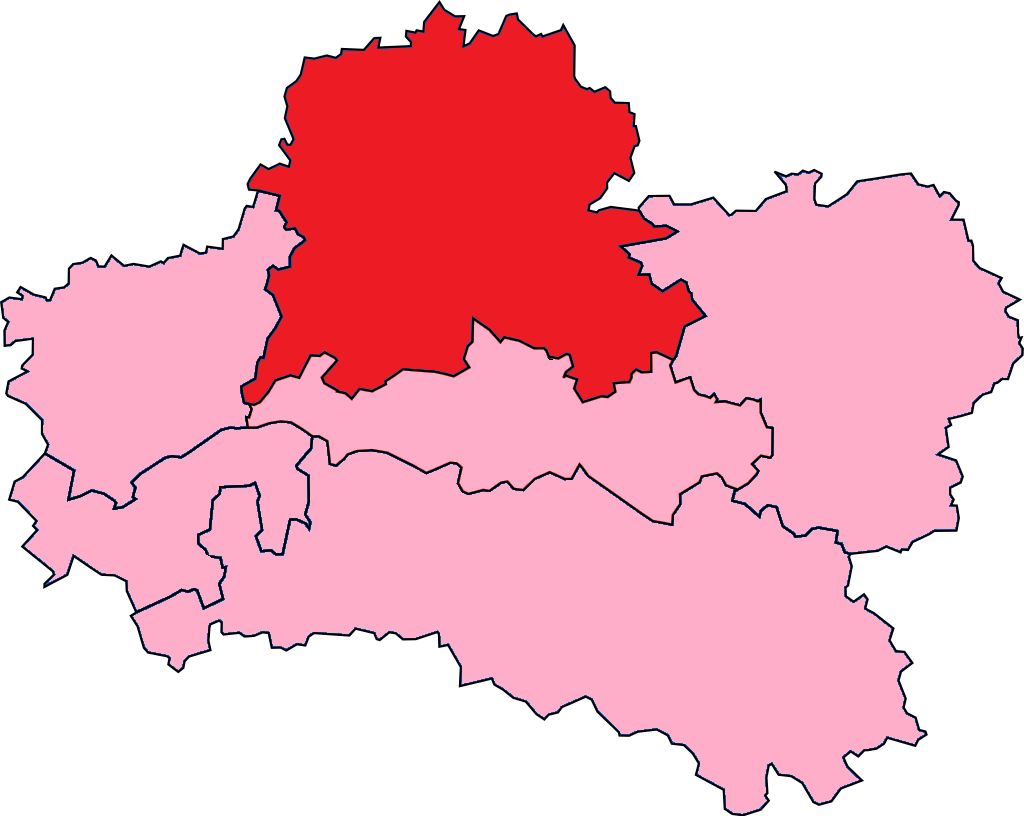
- Loiret's 5th Constituency shown within Loiret
- Deputy: Anthony Brosse; RE
- Department: Loiret
- Cantons: Beaune-la-Rolande, Bellegarde, Fleury-les-Aubrais, Malesherbes, Neuville-aux-Bois, Outarville, Pithiviers, Puiseaux
- Registered voters: 74554

The 5th constituency of the Loiret (French: Cinquième circonscription du Loiret) is a French legislative constituency in the Loiret département. Like the other 576 French constituencies, it elects one MP using a two round electoral system.

== Description ==
The 5th Constituency of the Loiret lies in the north of the department covering a largely rural area on the border with Île-de-France making it within easy reach of Paris.

This seat traditionally supported candidates from the conservative centre right parties. In 2017 the seat was held by The Republicans by the slender margin of 88 votes in the second round against En Marche!. However, LR did subsequently lose the seat to LREM in 2022, who narrowly defeated the far-right RN candidate by just 11 votes in the second roung.

== Assembly Members ==
Election	Member	Party
1988	Jean-Paul Charié	RPR
1993	Jean-Paul Charié	RPR
1997	Jean-Paul Charié	RPR
2002	Jean-Paul Charié	UMP
2007	Jean-Paul Charié	UMP
2012	Marianne Dubois	UMP
2017	Marianne Dubois	LR
2022	Anthony Brosse	RE
2024	Anthony Brosse	RE

== Election results ==
=== 2024 ===
Candidate	Party	Alliance	First round			Second round		
Candidate	Party	Alliance	Votes	%	+/–	Votes	%	+/–
Jean-Lin Lacapelle	RN		20,893	43.37	+15.50	23,335	49.30	-0.68
Anthony Brosse	RE	Ensemble	10,604	22.01	+0.27	23,999	50.70	+0.68
Anne-Laure Boutet	LFI	NFP	9,524	19.77	+0.90	withdrew		
Benjamin Quelin	LR	UDC	4,817	10.00	-8.66			
Christine Biardeau	DIV		1,259	2.61	new			
Martine Robert	REC		651	1.35	-2.46			
Céline Sottejeau	LO		429	0.89	-0.36			
Votes			48,177	100.00		47,334	100.00	
Valid votes			48,177	97.65	-0.12	47,334	95.49	+3.75
Blank votes			793	1.61	-0.03	1,675	3.38	-2.90
Null votes			365	0.74	+0.15	562	1.13	-0.85
Turnout			49,335	67.05	+18.53	49,571	67.35	+20.77
Abstentions			24,246	32.95	-18.53	24,034	32.65	-20.77
Registered voters			73,581			73,605		
Result			RE HOLD					

=== 2022 ===
Legislative Election 2022: Loiret's 5th constituency
Party	Candidate	Votes	%	±%
RN	Valentin Manent	9,741	27.87	+8.84
LREM (Ensemble)	Anthony Brosse	7,597	21.74	-8.11
LFI (NUPÉS)	Florence Chabirand	6,594	18.87	−0.30
LR (UDC)	Maxime Buizard	6,520	18.66	−4.94
DVD	Thierry Barjonet	1,745	4.99	N/A
REC	Eric de Nas de Tourris	1,330	3.81	−1.25
Others	N/A	1,420	-	−
Turnout		34,947	48.52	+0.60
2nd round result
LREM (Ensemble)	Anthony Brosse	15,747	50.02	+0.18
RN	Valentin Manent	15,736	49.98	N/A
Turnout		31,483	46.58	+8.82
LREM gain from LR				

=== 2017 ===
Legislative Election 2017: Loiret's 5th constituency
Party	Candidate	Votes	%	±%
LREM	David Simonnet	10,640	29.85	
LR	Marianne Dubois	8,414	23.60	
FN	Jeanne Beaulier	6,784	19.03	
LFI	Marie Agam	3,311	9.29	
PS	Thierry Stromboni	1,697	4.76	
EELV	Benoît Varin	1,250	3.51	
DIV	Nicolas Sanson	1,204	3.38	
DLF	Frédéric Malmartel	766	2.15	
Others	N/A	1,581		
Turnout		35,647	47.82	
2nd round result
LR	Marianne Dubois	14,120	50.16	
LREM	David Simonnet	14,032	49.84	
Turnout		28,152	37.76	
LR hold				

=== 2012 ===
Legislative Election 2012: Loiret's 5th constituency
Party	Candidate	Votes	%	±%
UMP	Marianne Dubois	14,609	34.50	
PS	Carole Canette	13,751	32.47	
FN	Jeanne Beaulier	8,675	20.48	
FG	Karine Percheron	1,965	4.64	
Others	N/A	3,349		
Turnout		42,349	58.26	
2nd round result
UMP	Marianne Dubois	21,627	53.82	
PS	Carole Canette	18,556	46.18	
Turnout		40,183	55.28	
UMP hold				

=== 1993 ===
Legislative Election 1993: Loiret's 5th constituency
Party	Candidate	Votes	%	±%
RPR	Jean-Paul Charié	25,850	46.86	
FN	Andre Beaudoin	8,477	15.37	
PS	Claude Laurent	8,178	14.82	
GE	Yves de Kisch	4,218	7.65	
PCF	Jean-Pierre Lefaucheux	4,168	7.56	
NERNA	Dominique Ernst	2,274	4.12	
LO	Patrick Lamiable	1,562	2.83	
EXG	Avelin Castello	440	0.80	
Turnout		58,300	72.86	
Registered electors		80,018		
2nd round result
RPR	Jean-Paul Charié	31,305	72.12	
FN	Andre Beaudoin	12,103	27.88	
Turnout		53,213	66.51	
Registered electors		80,007		
RPR hold				
