= Émilie Guerel =

French politician

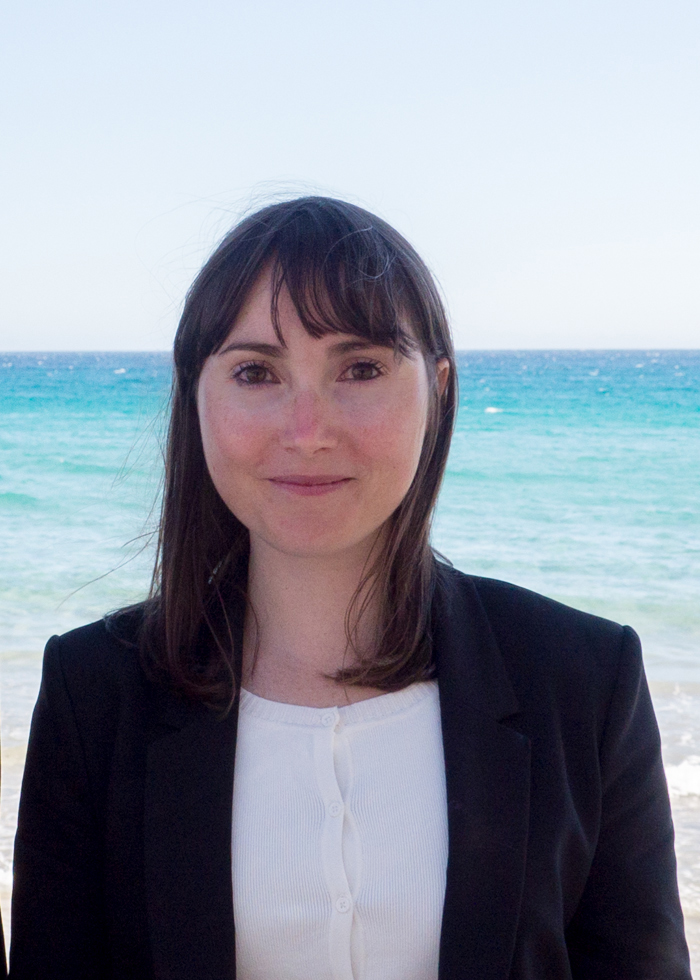

Member of the French National Assembly for Var's 7th constituency
- In office 21 June 2017 – 2022
- Preceded by: Jean-Sébastien Vialatte

Personal details
- Born: 18 December 1983 (age 42) Carpentras, Vaucluse, France
- Party: En Marche!

Émilie Guerel (born 18 December 1983) is a French politician of La République En Marche! (LREM) who served as a member of the French National Assembly from 2017 to 2022, representing the 7th constituency in the department of Var.

In parliament, Guerel served as member of the Committee on Legal Affairs. In this capacity, she was the parliament's co-rapporteur (alongside Marianne Dubois) on the introduction of the General National Service (SNU) in 2018.

== See also ==
- 2017 French legislative election
