= Var's 2nd constituency =

Constituency of the National Assembly of France

2nd constituency of Var
- inline Constituency of the National Assembly of France

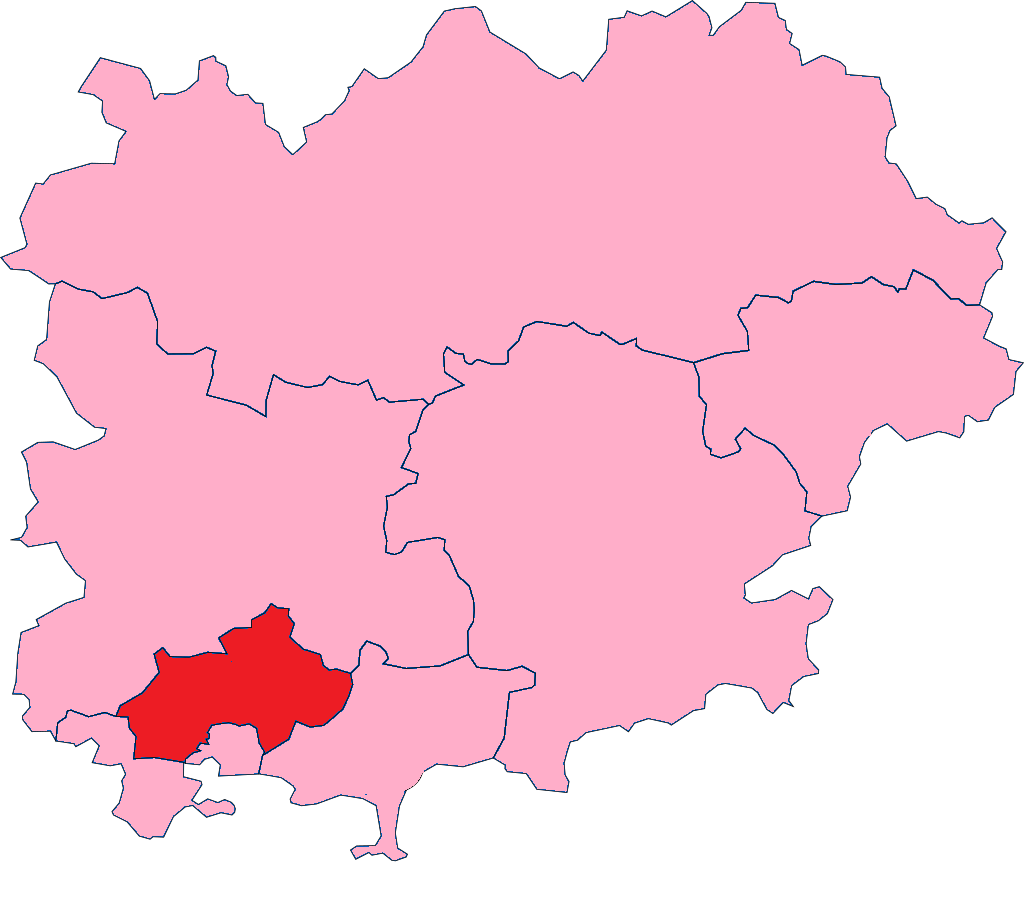
- Var's 2nd Constituency shown within the Var
- Deputy: Laure Lavalette; RN
- Department: Var
- Cantons: Ollioules (part), Toulon II, Toulon III, Solliès-Pont, La Valette-du-Var
- Registered voters: 90,541

The 2nd constituency of the Var (French: Deuxième circonscription du Var) is a French legislative constituency in the Var département. Like the other 576 French constituencies, it elects one MP using the two-round system, with a run-off if no candidate receives over 50% of the vote in the first round.

== Description ==
The 2nd constituency of the Var covers parts of northern Toulon as well as its suburb of La Valette-du-Var and the detached town of Solliès-Pont to the north west.

== Assembly Members ==
Election	Member	Party
1988	Louis Colombani	UDF
1993	Louis Colombani	UDF
1997	Robert Gaïa	PS
2002	Philippe Vitel	UMP
2007	Philippe Vitel	UMP
2012	Philippe Vitel	UMP
2017	Cécile Muschotti	LREM
2022	Laure Lavalette	RN

== Election results ==
=== 2024 ===
Legislative Election 2024: Var's 2nd constituency
Party	Candidate	Votes	%	±%
HOR (Ensemble)	Josy Chambon	13,061	21.72	n/a
DIV	Florian Fimbel	405	0.67	n/a
RN	Laure Lavalette	30,551	50.81	+19.95
LO	Jean-Michel Ghiotto	493	0.82	n/a
LFI (NFP)	Isaline Cornil	11,613	19.31	+1.40
REC	Julie Bonnefoy	1,506	2.50	−5.47
ÉAC	Olivier Lesage	2,500	4.16	n/a
Turnout		60,129	97.50	+52.49
Registered electors		92,819		
RN hold				

=== 2022 ===
Legislative Election 2022: Var's 2nd constituency
Party	Candidate	Votes	%	±%
RN	Laure Lavalette	12,595	30.86	+7.44
LREM (Ensemble)	Ange Musso	11,203	27.45	-6.26
LFI (NUPÉS)	Isaline Cornil	7,311	17.91	+2.23
REC	Aline Bertrand	3,252	7.97	N/A
LR (UDC)	Julien Argento	2,566	6.29	−12.95
Others	N/A	3,191	9.53	
Turnout		40,818	45.01	+0.92
2nd round result
RN	Laure Lavalette	19,756	51.64	+8.91
LREM (Ensemble)	Ange Musso	18,504	48.36	−8.91
Turnout		38,260	43.96	+8.60
RN gain from LREM				

=== 2017 ===
Legislative Election 2017: Var's 2nd constituency
Party	Candidate	Votes	%	±%
LREM	Cécile Muschotti	13,455	33.71	
FN	Rache Roussel	9,350	23.42	
LR	Philippe Vitel	7,678	19.24	
LFI	Michel Lagreca	4,247	10.64	
EELV	Guy Rebec	1,146	2.87	
DLF	Marie-Reine Zimmermann	905	2.27	
PCF	Alain Bolla	867	2.17	
Others	N/A	2,001		
Turnout		39,916	44.09	
2nd round result
LREM	Cécile Muschotti	18,334	57.27	
FN	Rache Roussel	13,678	42.73	
Turnout		32,012	35.36	
LREM gain from LR				

=== 2012 ===
Legislative Election 2012: Var's 2nd constituency
Party	Candidate	Votes	%	±%
UMP	Philippe Vitel	16,934	35.28	
PS	Mireille Peirano	14,461	30.13	
FN	Jean-Yves Waquet	11,650	24.27	
FG	Luc Leandri	2,543	5.30	
DVE	Olivier Lesage	999	2.08	
Others	N/A	1,406		
Turnout		47,993	54.98	
2nd round result
UMP	Philippe Vitel	19,409	40.13	
PS	Mireille Peirano	18,329	37.89	
FN	Jean-Yves Waquet	10,633	21.98	
Turnout		48,371	55.41	
UMP hold				

=== 2007 ===
Legislative Election 2007: Var's 2nd constituency
Party	Candidate	Votes	%	±%
UMP	Philippe Vitel	16,500	53.18	
PS	Robert Gaïa	6,565	21.16	
FN	Jean-Louis Bouguereau	2,204	7.10	
MoDem	Marika Antal-Nguyen	1,786	5.76	
LV	Guy Rebec	851	2.74	
PCF	André de Ubeda	808	2.60	
Others	N/A	2,315		
Turnout		31,507	55.40	
UMP hold				

=== 2002 ===
Legislative Election 2002: Var's 2nd constituency
Party	Candidate	Votes	%	±%
UMP	Philippe Vitel	13,003	41.14	
PS	Robert Gaïa	9,008	28.50	
FN	Jean-Claude Lunardelli	6,437	20.37	
RPF	Joseph Santini	650	2.06	
Others	N/A	2,509		
Turnout		32,256	60.40	
2nd round result
UMP	Philippe Vitel	17,108	61.82	
PS	Robert Gaïa	10,568	38.18	
Turnout		29,318	54.90	
UMP gain from PS				

=== 1997 ===
Legislative Election 1997: Var's 2nd constituency
Party	Candidate	Votes	%	±%
FN	Jean-Claude Lunardelli	10,449	30.05	
PS	Robert Gaïa	7,241	20.82	
UDF	Louis Colombani	5,907	16.99	
PCF	Danielle De March	4,105	11.80	
UDF	Philippe Goetz*	3,129	9.00	
DVD	Jean-Pierre Rinaldi	928	2.67	
GE	Renée Chelli	865	2.49	
Others	N/A	2,150		
Turnout		35,915	64.78	
2nd round result
PS	Robert Gaïa	17,988	52.68	
FN	Jean-Claude Lunardelli	16,156	47.32	
Turnout		37,584	67.79	
PS gain from UDF				

* UDF dissident
