= Louis Colombani =

French politician (1931–2024)

Deputy of the French National Assembly for Var's 2nd constituency
- In office 23 June 1988 – 21 April 1997
- Preceded by: François Léotard (1986) proportional representation
- Succeeded by: Robert Gaïa

Personal details
- Born: 5 May 1931 Toulon, France
- Died: 29 January 2024 (aged 92) Menorca, Spain
- Party: PR; UDF
- Occupation: Commercial trader

Louis Colombani (5 May 1931 – 29 January 2024) was a French commercial trader and politician of the Republican Party (PR) and the Union for French Democracy (UDF).

== Biography ==
Born in Toulon on 5 May 1931, Colombani was first elected to the National Assembly in 1988. Re-elected in 1993, he was eventually defeated in the first round in 1997, ultimately succeeded by Robert Gaïa.

Louis Colombani died on the Spanish island of Menorca on 29 January 2024, at the age of 92.
