= Laure Lavalette =

French lawyer and politician (born 1976)

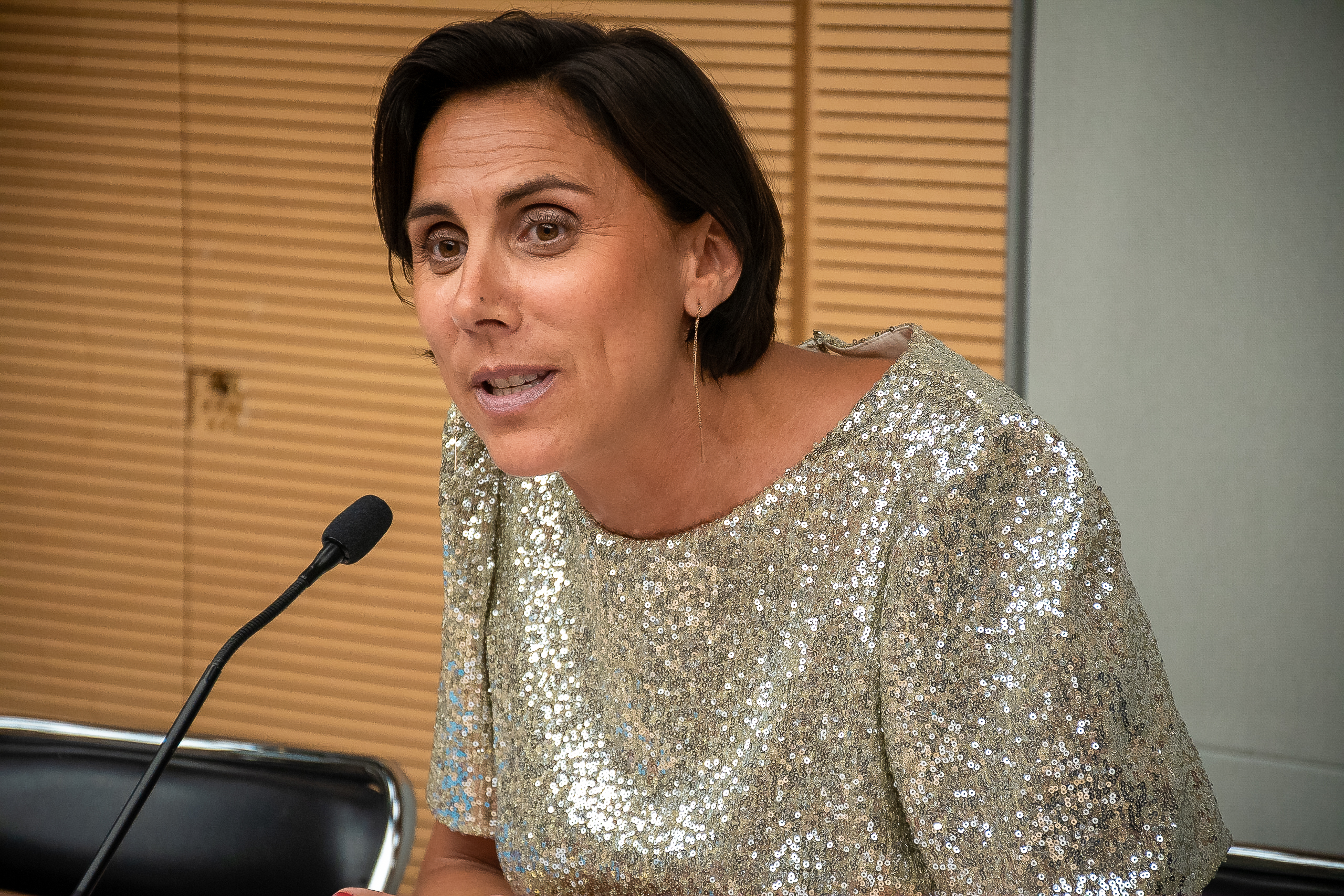

Member of the National Assembly for Var's 2nd constituency
- Incumbent
- Assumed office 22 June 2022
- Preceded by: Cécile Muschotti

Member of the Regional Council of Provence-Alpes-Côte d'Azur
- Incumbent
- Assumed office 2 July 2021
- President: Renaud Muselier

Personal details
- Born: 11 April 1976 (age 50) Paris, France
- Party: National Rally (1997–1999, 2018–present)
- Other political affiliations: National Republican Movement (1999)
- Children: 5
- Occupation: Lawyer

Laure Lavalette (French pronunciation: [lɔʁ lavalɛt]; born 11 April 1976) is a French politician who has represented the 2nd constituency of the Var department in the National Assembly since 2022. A member of the National Rally (RN), she started her political career as a municipal councillor of Toulon (2014–2022). Lavalette is a lawyer by occupation.

== Education and personal life ==
Laure Lavalette was born on 16 April 1976 in Talence. Her father, Jean-Philippe Lavelette, was active in the far right, having been a member of the neo-fascist movement Ordre Nouveau, and later of the National Front (FN). He stood as an FN candidate in the 1993 and 1997 parliamentary elections in the fifth constituency of the Gironde. Her grandfather was an activist with the Croix-de-Feu.

After completing a Master’s degree in viticulture and wine law in Bordeaux, Laure Lavalette settled in Toulon in 1999. A traditionalist Catholic, she attends Mass in Latin every Sunday and adheres to the Tridentine Rite.

Lavelette was born and spent her youth in Paris. She trained and practised as a lawyer in Bordeaux before moving to Toulon in 1999. However, she left her profession for a period in order to care for one of her children who was born with down's syndrome. She is married to a fisherman and has five children. Lavelette has also described herself as a practicing Catholic.

== Political career ==
Then member of the far right student union Renouveau Etudiant, she joined the National Front (now National Rally) in 1997 and unsuccessfully stood for the party in the regional elections of that year in Bègles. In 1999, she defected to the National Republican Movement formed by former National Front politician Bruno Mégret but subsequently returned to the National Front.

Lavelette was elected municipal councillor within the opposition in Toulon in 2014 then regional councilor in Provence-Alpes-Côte d'Azur in June 2021.

During the 2022 French legislative election Lavelette contested Var's 2nd Constituency and was elected defeating incumbent deputy Cécile Muschotti.

== Positions ==
Lavelette has campaigned in support of pro-life messages. In 2014, she signed a text asking local elected officials to support for the senatorial or presidential elections, the candidates committing, among other things, to "repeal, in the long term, the right to abortion." During her 2015 campaign in Provence-Alpes-Côte d'Azur, she supported the abolition of family planning public subsidies in the event of victory, the message on which Marion Maréchal campaigned.

In 2022, she expressed opposition to proposals by the LREM led government to extend the abortion period in France.

However, that same year Lavelette stated that she did not support banning abortion in France, claiming "at no time did I question the right to abortion" and added that repealing the Veil Act was "not a political objective" for her.
