= Frédéric Boccaletti =

French Businessman

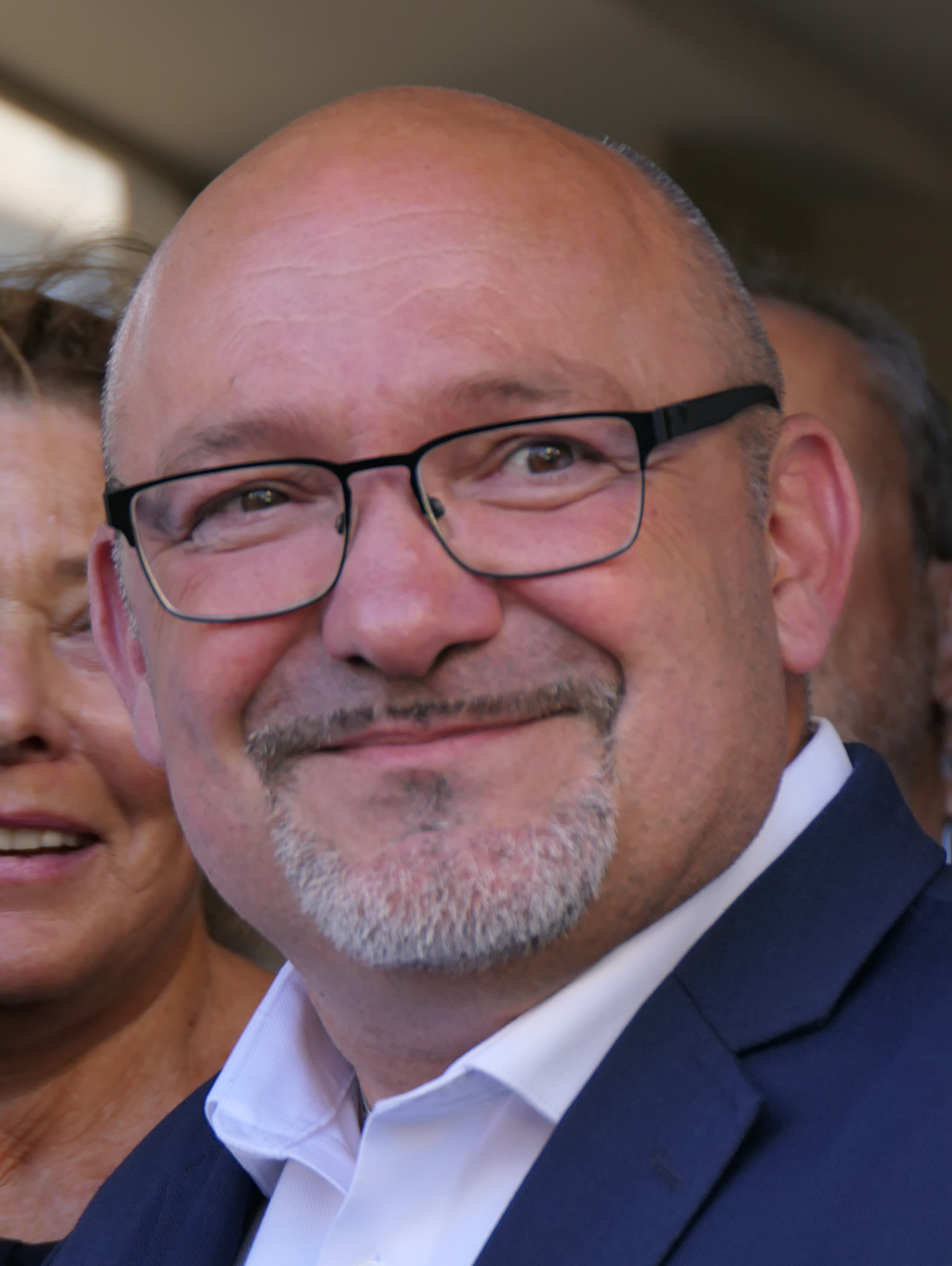

Member of the National Assembly for Var's 7th constituency
- Incumbent
- Assumed office 22 June 2022
- Preceded by: Émilie Guerel

Personal details
- Born: 23 November 1973 (age 52) Martigues, France
- Party: National Rally (1994–1998, 2008–present)
- Other political affiliations: National Republican Movement (1999–2008)
- Occupation: Bookseller, businessman, politician

Frédéric Boccaletti (born 23 November 1973 in Martigues) is a French businessman, political activist and politician affiliated to the National Rally.

Since 2022, he has been a member of the National Assembly for Var's 7th constituency was chairman of the National Rally's group in the Regional Council of Provence-Alpes-Côte d'Azur.

== Biography ==
=== Early life ===
Boccaletti was born in 1973. According to his personal biography, he dropped out of high school and began training as a chef. He then became a bookseller at the Anthinéa bookstore in Toulon which he later named and took ownership of. Boccaletti stated the name pays homage to the book Anthinéa, from Athens to Florence by Charles Maurras which he republished.

=== Political career ===
In 1994, Boccaletti became deputy secretary of the National Youth Front (now known as Génération Nation), the former youth wing of the French National Front. However, he joined Bruno Mégret's splinter National Republican Movement party in 1999 and was elected as a municipal councilor for the party in 2001.

In 2008, he returned to the National Front and was Jean-Marie Le Pen's campaign manager during the 2010 French regional elections. He also served as Marion Maréchal-Le Pen's campaign chief during the 2015 French regional elections and succeeded her as the chairman of the FN in the Provence-Alpes-Côte d'Azur region until he was made to step down in 2020.

During the 2022 French legislative election he was elected as the National Rally's candidate for Var's 7th constituency defeating Émilie Guerel during the election.

=== Views and controversies ===
Boccaletti has been considered a more hardline and traditionalist far-right member of the National Rally with ideas close to former leader Jean-Marie Le Pen and Marion Le Pen.

French newspapers Libération and Le Point indicated that Boccaletti's bookshop often stocked controversial works, including books with racist and Holocaust denying content. He has also been noted and implicated for links to Holocaust revisionist writer Éric Delcroix and former leader of the British National Party Nick Griffin.

Boccaletti selection as a candidate in the 2022 election also caused some controversy after it was found he had been charged and briefly jailed in 2000 with illegal possession of a weapon before being pardoned for health reasons. The revelation came after Marine Le Pen's announcement that the RN would not select candidates with criminal records. His selection also caused a stir within the RN as he had been removed from his post as regional chairman due to repeated controversies.
