= Pharmacy residency =

Post-graduate internship

Pharmacy residency is education a pharmacist can pursue beyond the degree required for licensing as a pharmacist (in the United States of America: PharmD). A pharmacy residency program allows for the implementation of skill set and knowledge acquired in pharmacy school through interaction with the public either in a hospital setting or community practice. The program is done over a span of about two years after graduation from pharmacy school and licensure as a pharmacist. Pharmacy residency helps improve the resume of a pharmacist so as to increase chances of obtaining employment outside community practice. A 2022 review suggested that there is sufficient evidence that residency develops key competencies for junior pharmacists.

== Residency by country ==
=== In Thailand ===
After completing Pharm.D.(6-year program) and registering as pharmacist

The Royal College of Pharmacy of Thailand (RCPhT)

The Royal College consists of 7 colleges.

1. College of Pharmacotherapy

Residencies and Fellowships in Pharmacy Practice (Pharmaceutical care) (4-year Program)

In 2003, representatives from school of pharmacy and Thai Pharmacy council met to discuss the need for initiation of an organized, directed, postgraduate training program in a defined area of pharmacy practice also known as "residency" and "fellowship” training. In 2006, the residency program is formally established and offered through 3 universities naming Khon Kaen University, Prince Songklanagarind University and Naraesuan University. A residency may occur at any career point following an entry-level degree in pharmacy. Individuals planning practice-oriented careers are encouraged to complete all formal academic education before entry into a residency. Residency and fellowship programs in Thailand are integrated into intensive 4-yr program. The first year “Pharmacy Practice” exists primarily to train pharmacists in professional practice and management activities. Residencies provide experience in integrating pharmacy services with the comprehensive needs of individual practice settings and provide in-depth experiences leading to advanced practice skills and knowledge. The resident's practice experiences are closely directed and evaluated by a qualified practitioner-preceptor. The 2nd and 3rd year “Specialized Residencies” advance an ability to conceptualize new and improved pharmacy services. Within a given residency program, there is considerable consistency in content for each resident. In addition, accreditation standards and program guidelines produced by College of Pharmacotherapeutics (Thailand) provide considerable program content detail and look after consistency among programs. The 4th year “Fellowship” is aimed primarily to develop competency in the scientific research process, including conceptualizing, planning, conducting, and reporting research. Under the close direction and instruction of a qualified researcher-preceptor, the participant (the fellow) receives a highly individualized learning experience that utilizes the fellow's research interests and knowledge needs as a focus for his or her education and training. A fellowship candidate is expected to possess basic practice skills relevant to the knowledge area of the fellowship. Such skills may be obtained through practice experience or through an appropriate residency and should be maintained during the program.

2. College of Pharmaceutical and Health Consumer Protection

Residencies and Fellowships in Pharmaceutical and Health Consumer Protection (3-year Program)

3. College of Herbal Pharmacy

Certiflcate Short Course Training Program in Herbal Pharmacy (14 weeks)

4. College of Industrial Pharmacy

The training management system is a separate training. It is a credit accumulation system to complete the study plan. Trainees must register for and complete a short-term training course (18 weeks) of 4 courses, 2 credits of research methods and statistics in industrial pharmacy, and conduct a professional action research project to complete the credits according to the curriculum structure.

5. College of Community Pharmacy

Residencies and Fellowships in Community Pharmacy (4-year Program)

6. College of Pharmacy Administration

The year-round education system is a credit accumulation system to complete the study plan. Pharmacists who study must register and pass 4 short-term training courses (4.5 months) and carry out projects to complete the credits according to the certificate curriculum structure.

7. College of Pharmacogenomics and Precision Pharmacy

Residencies and Fellowships in Pharmacogenomics and Precision Pharmacy (4-year Program)

8. College of Advanced Therapy Medicinal Product pharmacy (Establishment project)

=== In France ===
The residency lasts four years (eight semesters) and is open to students having succeeded in the national competitive examination ("concours national de l'internat en pharmacie") regulated by French law and happening once per year in December. The resident is both a student and an employee of the hospital and receives salary.

Residents are usually working in hospitals and have night / week-end shifts duties (additional remuneration). Residents can also be asked to perform emergency tasks such as during the COVID-19 pandemic in 2020 where they were contributing to qPCR analyses in addition to their normal duties. Residents must also validate university courses during their residency.

There are three specialties or section:

- Hospital pharmacy (also called hospital and industrial pharmacy),
- Medical Biology and
- Pharmaceutical Innovation and Research (Innovation Pharmaceutique et Recherche since 2009 or Pharmacie spécialisée in French).

In each specialty, there are subspecialties or sections, for instance research specializations.

The completion of the residency leads to two to four degrees depending on the section:

- the specific degree related to the residency and obtained after defending a thesis is called "Diplôme d'Etudes Spécialisées" (DES),
- the Pharm.D. (Doctor of Pharmacy) degree or "Diplôme d'Etat de Docteur en Pharmacie" obtained after the same defense and at the end of the residency (4 years, i.e. 9 years in total).

Residents in the Pharmaceutical Innovation and Research section obtain two additional degrees: a master's degree and a Doctor of Philosophy (Ph.D.). This section allows the residents to focus on research projects alongside hospital appointments and university courses. The first year of the master's education is obtained following additional courses that the student must validate before starting the residency. The second year of the master's education is usually validated after the first year of residency and following the defense of the master's project giving the degree. The last three years of residency are dedicated to the Ph.D. project and completed with a specific Ph.D. defense.

=== In Spain ===
The residency lasts four years (that leads to the title pharmacist specialist in Hospital Pharmacy which is the official title required to work as a hospital pharmacist). There are several minors sub-specialties (not official) such as Oncology pharmacy, Nutritional pharmacy, Infectious disease pharmacy, Ambulatory Care pharmacy, Clinical Trials Management, Drug Information pharmacy and Clinical Pharmacokinetics.

Spanish Pharmacists can also major in other specialties such as Clinical Biochemistry, Microbiology and Parasitology, Immunology, Clinical/biological Analysis, Nuclear Pharmacy or Radiopharmacy, Pharmaceutical Analysis and Industrial Pharmacy.

=== In the US ===
The first year is generally referred to as post graduate year one or PGY1. A second year is referred to as a PGY2 and places emphasis on a specialty practice area. Each residency is a year long endeavor although some programs are combining a PGY1 and PGY2 into a two-year endeavor. For the residency year beginning in 2016, 1708 accredited programs participated in the ASHP Resident matching program. In total, 3954 residents were placed within these programs.

There are three different kinds of PGY1's, as recognized by American Society of Health-System Pharmacists. These are Pharmacy Practice (based in hospital setting), Community Pharmacy residency in partnership with the American Pharmacists Association (APhA) (based in a community pharmacy) and Managed Care Pharmacy residency in partnership with the Academy of Managed Care Pharmacy (AMCP) (based in managed care organizations such as health plans or pharmacy benefit management companies [PBMs]).

The Pharmacy Practice residency usually covers a wide array of topics and deems one eligible for Board Certification in Pharmacotherapy Specialty.

The Community Pharmacy residency usually covers many issues at hand with patients coming to community pharmacies and provides in depth knowledge of patient medication adherence patterns, medication therapy management, and collaborative drug therapy management with associated practitioners with prescribing authorities.

Managed Care Pharmacy residency trains pharmacists to deliver pharmaceutical care utilizing three practice models: 1. individual patient care in which the pharmacist communicates findings and recommendations to patients and those health care providers who provide care directly to the patient; 2. care provided to targeted groups of patients in which the pharmacist designs, conducts, monitors and evaluates the outcomes of organized and structured programs; and 3. population care management in which the pharmacist develops and implements medication-use policy.

To be considered for PGY1 equivalent experience the individual must have practiced at least THREE years as a PHARMACIST and must be licensed to practice as a pharmacist in the US.

The PGY2 consists of many different sub-specialties. The American Society of Health-System Pharmacists recognizes the following: Ambulatory Care; Biologics/Pharmacogenomics; Cardiology; Community; Critical Care; Drug Information; Emergency Medicine; Geriatrics; Health System Pharmacy Practice Administration; HIV; Infectious Diseases; Internal Medicine; Managed Care; Medication Use Safety; Nephrology; Nuclear Pharmacy; Nutrition Support Pharmacy; Oncology; Palliative Care/Pain Management; Pediatrics; Pharmacoeconomics and Outcomes Research; Pharmacogenetics; Pharmacotherapy; Pharmacy Informatics; Psychiatric Pharmacy; Solid Organ Transplantation; Transition of Care.

The PGY2 year further trains the pharmacist with symptoms, treatments (both drug and non-drug) in a particular area. Upon completion of a PGY2, one becomes eligible to take the Pharmacy Board Certification Exam for one of the seven specialties currently recognized by the Board of Pharmaceutical Specialties. These Specialties are psychiatry, nutritional support, oncology, pediatric, pharmacotherapy, nuclear pharmacy, and ambulatory care.

After completion of PGY1 or PGY2, one can either choose to practice, pursue another residency, or a fellowship, which would train one to be an independent researcher.

There are separate fields called pharmacy fellowships programs, which are similar but separate paths.

=== In Canada ===
A typical pharmacy residency in Canada consists of 12 months of structured rotations covering aspects such as pharmacy practice and administration, internal medicine, pediatrics, cardiology, surgery, nephrology, gastrointestinal systems, respirology, emergency medicine, intensive care, ambulatory care, and toxicology. Certain centres may have more specialized care, as is the case in cancer agencies and pediatric hospitals. This 12-month program is equivalent to the USA's PGY1.

A second, more specialized residency is available in certain hospitals and institutions in Eastern Canada.

All accredited residencies are in collaboration with universities, local health authorities, and the Canadian Society of Hospital Pharmacists.

Upon completion, the resident may use the title designation of ACPR (Accredited Canadian Pharmacy Resident).
