= Clinical biologist =

A clinical biologist is a health professional such as a doctor of medicine, pharmacist, biologist that is specialized in clinical biology, a medical specialty derived from clinical pathology. The concept includes interventional biology, including assisted reproductive technology.

These professionals follow a medical residency whose duration varies between countries (from 3 to 5 years).

This term is frequently used in France, Switzerland, Belgium, and other countries in Western Europe, Africa or Asia.

== Europe ==
=== France ===
In France, a clinical biologist (biologiste médical) is a doctor in medicine or pharmacy who has completed a four-year specialization in medical biology. The profession is strictly regulated, and clinical biologists are responsible for overseeing and interpreting laboratory analyses. Their training includes a national competitive exam (internat de biologie médicale), followed by a structured residency program in clinical laboratories. They play a key role in laboratory diagnostics, clinical decision-making, and quality management of biological analyses.

=== Italy ===
In Italy to become clinical or medical Biologist, you must achieve a BSc. and a MSc. in Biological Sciences and then four years of medical school of specialization in clinical Pathology ex general Pathology, ex Clinical biology.

=== Switzerland ===
In Switzerland, the equivalent profession to a clinical biologist is the FAMH Specialist in Laboratory Medicine. This title is awarded by the Foederatio Analyticorum Medicinalium Helveticorum (FAMH), the Swiss organization responsible for the postgraduate training and certification of specialists in medical laboratory diagnostics.

To obtain this title, professionals must complete a four-year postgraduate training program, which is carried out alongside employment in an accredited medical laboratory. The program is open to individuals holding a medical degree (MD), a pharmacy degree, or a master’s/PhD in biomedical sciences, biology, or related disciplines. The training covers several specialties, including hematology, clinical chemistry, medical microbiology, immunology, and genetics.

The FAMH Specialist in Laboratory Medicine plays a key role in medical diagnostics. They are responsible for the supervision and interpretation of laboratory analyses, validation of results, and communication with clinicians. They also ensure quality management and compliance with ISO 15189 standards, while contributing to the training and supervision of laboratory technical staff.

The FAMH Specialist title is federally recognized and is a mandatory requirement to lead and validate medical diagnostic laboratories in Switzerland.

=== Belgium ===
In Belgium, a clinical biologist (biologiste clinique) is a medical doctor or pharmacist who has completed a five-year postgraduate specialization in clinical biology (biologie clinique). This specialization is regulated by the Belgian Ministry of Public Health, and clinical biologists work in both hospital and private laboratories. Their training includes rotations in different laboratory disciplines, including hematology, microbiology, and clinical chemistry. They are responsible for interpreting laboratory results, ensuring quality control, and advising clinicians on diagnostic strategies.

== See also ==
- Biological pharmacist
- Medical laboratory
- Clinical laboratory scientist
- Clinical pathology
