= Marianne Dubois =

French politician

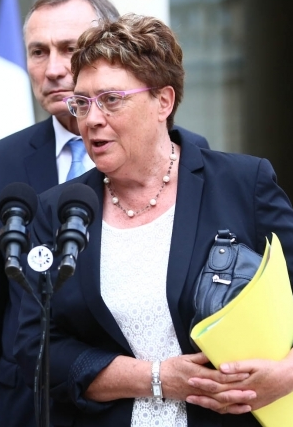

Member of the National Assembly for Loiret's 5th constituency
- In office 4 November 2009 – 2022
- Preceded by: Jean-Paul Charié

Personal details
- Born: 17 December 1957 (age 68) Corbeil-Essonnes, France
- Party: The Republicans

Marianne Dubois (born 17 December 1957) is a French Republican politician who has represented Loiret's 5th constituency in the National Assembly from 2009 to 2022.

== Political career ==
In parliament, Dubois served on the Defence Committee. In this capacity, she was the parliament's co-rapporteur (alongside Émilie Guerel) on the introduction of the General National Service (SNU) in 2018. In addition to her committee assignments, she was a member of the French-Bolivian Parliamentary Friendship Group.

Dubois did not stand down at the 2022 French legislative election.

== Political positions ==
In the Republicans’ 2016 presidential primaries, Dubois endorsed François Fillon as the party's candidate for the office of President of France. In the party's 2017 leadership election, she later supported Laurent Wauquiez. Ahead of the 2022 presidential elections, she publicly declared her support for Michel Barnier as the Republicans’ candidate.
