= Philippe Vitel =

French politician

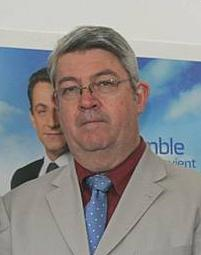
Vitel in 2008

Philippe Vitel (French pronunciation: [filip vitɛl]; born February 22, 1955, in Toulon) is a former member of the National Assembly of France. He represented Var's 2nd constituency, before losing his seat in the 2017 legislative election. He is a member of The Republicans.
