= Jean-Sébastien Vialatte =

French politician

Mayor of Six-Fours-les-Plages
- Incumbent
- Assumed office 26 June 1995
- Preceded by: Philippe Estève

Personal details
- Born: 30 January 1951 (age 75) Saint-Étienne, France
- Party: RPR; UMP; LR
- Occupation: Biological pharmacist

Jean-Sébastien Vialatte (French pronunciation: [ʒɑ̃ sebastjɛ̃ vjalat]; born 30 January 1951) is a French politician and Mayor of Six-Fours-les-Plages. From 2002 to 2017 he was a member of the National Assembly of France, where he represented the Var department. Vialatte is a member of the Les Republicains.
