= Doctor of Pharmacy =

Doctoral degree in pharmacy

A Doctor of Pharmacy (PharmD; Neo-Latin: Pharmaciae Doctor) is a professional doctorate in pharmacy. In some countries, it is a proficient graduate degree to practice the profession of pharmacy or to become a clinical pharmacist. In many countries, people with their Doctor of Pharmacy are allowed to practice independently and can prescribe drugs directly to patients. A PharmD program has significant experiential and/or clinical education components in introductory and advanced levels for the safe and effective use of drugs. Experiential education prepares graduates to be practice-ready, as they already have spent a significant amount of time training in areas of direct patient care and research.

== Africa ==
=== Algeria ===
In Algeria, Doctor of Pharmacy degree replaced the state's diploma of pharmacist in 2011, thus concepts on clinical pharmacy and pharmaceutical care were taught for the first time. Algeria has 01 Faculty of Pharmacy (University of Algiers 1) and 08 Pharmacy Department (University of Batna 2, University of Blida 1, University of Tlemcen, University of Tizi Ouzzou, University of Sétif 1, University of Sidi Bel Abbes, University of Annaba, University of Constantine 3).

=== Egypt ===
PharmD is a professional degree in pharmaceutical sciences and according to newly adopted educational advancements, it is the minimum requirement to be licensed as a Pharmacist in Egypt, the curriculum consists of 6 years ( 5 years of Pharmaceutical & clinical studies followed by 1 year of Clinical internships ), this program is intended for students who have graduated from High school. As for the Pharmacists with a bachelor of Pharmaceutical Sciences who graduated before the decree of the new law, there is a Postgraduate PharmD offered by many faculties of Pharmacy for Pharmacists, The duration of the program consists of two calendar years. The first year consists of many didactic courses covering topics such as pharmacotherapy, pharmacokinetics, and pharmaceutical care of many diseases. The second year consists of clinical rotations in different specialties including ambulatory care, oncology, cardiology, nephrology, pediatrics, and others. Some of the universities that offer this degree include Capital University,Cairo University, Ain Shams University, Mansoura University, Tanta University, Alexandria University, Suez Canal University, Beni- Suef University and Galala University.

=== Ghana ===
PharmD is a 6-year course offered in Ghana from the academic year 2012/2013, initially by the Kwame Nkrumah University of Science and Technology (KNUST). It leads to the award of the Doctor of Pharmacy certificate making one eligible to qualify, register and operate as a licensed pharmacist. An aggregate of 06 in the WASSCE results is currently the acceptable cut-off point. Also, a year top-up program was rolled out in the 2017/18 academic year for practicing pharmacists with the B.Pharm(Bachelor of Pharmacy) qualification to obtain the Pharm.D qualification which will soon become the minimum degree for licensure. The University of Health and Allied Sciences (UHAS) - Volta Region (2016/17 academic year), The University of Ghana - Legon, Entrance University College of Health Sciences - Spintex and Central University (Ghana) - Miotso (in 2018/19 academic year) The University for Development Studies-UDS, Tamale(2018/19 academic year), have also rolled out the Pharm.D program.

The first graduating group of the Pharm.D course in Ghana graduated in °2018.

=== Morocco ===
PharmD is a program offered at the Faculty of Medicine and Pharmacy of Rabat. and the Faculty of Medicine and Pharmacy of Casablanca. In Morocco, Pharm.D studies can only be accessed through a competitive examination ("concours", with numerus clausus) happening at the start of the first year of health studies. All candidates hold a Scientific Baccalaureate from the equivalent to high schools (lycée). About a 100 students are accepted every year. In order to obtain the state diploma of "Doctor of Pharmacy", studies last a minimum of six years, or 11 years for students choosing residency (hospital/clinical pharmacy, pharmaceutical industry or medical biology). It is accessible through another two competitive exams, even more selective. The first (Internat) is accessible in the start of the sixth year, it grants residency after two years of internship and after the student defends their thesis. The second (Résidanat) is accessible after obtaining the doctorate. Residency lasts four years and gives another diploma of specialist like in medicine (DES for "diplôme d'études spécialisées" ).

=== Nigeria ===
Presently, these are the only universities in Nigeria offering the Doctor of Pharmacy (PharmD.) program. These are the University of Benin, Benin City, Bayero University, Kano, University of Nigeria, Nsukka, University of Jos, Gombe State University, Delta State University, Abraka, University of Ilorin, and University of Ibadan, and the State University of Medical And Applied Sciences, Igbo Eno, and most recently, the University of PortHarcourt and Sa'adu Zungur University, Bauchi. The University of Benin (Uniben) commenced the program in 2001 following the approval given for the commencement of the program by the regulatory government agency for pharmacy education and practice in the country, Pharmacy Council of Nigeria (PCN). However, it was not until 2016 that the overall regulatory government agency for all university degree programs in the country, National Universities Commission (NUC), formally approved the PharmD degree program. Like other universities approved for PharmD program in Nigeria, the PharmD in Uniben is a six-year undergraduate program. Upon successful completion of the program in Uniben, students are awarded both the Bachelor of Pharmacy (BPharm) degree and the Doctor of Pharmacy (PharmD) degree. Prior to the commencement of the program, the university offered a five-year BPharm degree program which commenced in 1970. In the PharmD program, students are given extensive didactic preclinical/professional clinical preparation as well as clinical training (including pharmaceutical care) in different hospitals and community pharmacies. Students are prepared to have knowledge on patients counseling, drug information, pharmaceutical care, adverse drug reaction reporting, pharmacovigilance and much more. Pharmacy council of Nigeria and the national professional body of pharmacists, Pharmaceutical Society of Nigeria (PSN), have envisaged that in the near future, PharmD degree will become the minimum educational qualification for the registration/licensing of fresh graduates of Nigeria's pharmacy schools for practice in the country. Through the efforts of the PCN, most pharmacy schools in Nigeria are now intensifying their preparations to commence the PharmD degree program.

=== South Africa ===
Since 2006, Pharm.D is a post-graduate course being offered by Rhodes University.

=== Tunisia ===
The PharmD program has been available in Tunisia since 1975.

There is only one faculty in Tunisia that provides education for PharmD; Faculty of pharmacy of Monastir.

It is a diverse program focusing on pharmaceutical sciences, chemistry and biology along with marketing and management. It can have two minors : biological pharmacy and industrial pharmacy.

== Asia ==
=== Bangladesh ===
At present a five-year professional degree is offered in various public universities in Bangladesh. Previously, it was a four-year degree (Graduation) and a one-year degree (Post-Graduation) in Pharmacy is offered in numerous universities of Bangladesh. The study material is taught in English. The textbooks, exams as well as thesis are also provided in English. The universities are the University of Dhaka since 1964, Jahangirnagar University since 1982, University of Chittagong, Rajshahi University, Khulna University, Jagannath University, Pabna University of Science & Technology, Jessore University of Science & Technology and Noakhali Science & Technology University, Gopalganj Science and Technology University. All of these are government universities. There are also 20 private universities in Bangladesh offering pharmacy education. Among them Gono Bishwabidyalay, BGC Trust University Bangladesh (BGCTUB), Southeast University (SEU), East West University, Northern University Bangladesh since 2003, Daffodil International University, University of Science and Technology Chittagong (USTC), Stamford University Bangladesh (SUB), Manarat International University (MIU), Dhaka International University (DIU), The University of Asia Pacific, International Islamic University Chittagong, North South University, ASA University Bangladesh (ASAUB), City University (CU) and University of Development Alternative (UODA), Bangladesh University(BU) are the top rated private universities. It is the best for home and abroad students. The B.Pharm. is completed in 4 years and the M.Pharm. in one year. Pharmacy Council of Bangladesh (PCB) is the Professional Regulatory Authority for Pharmacists in Bangladesh.

=== India ===
The PharmD degree was introduced by the Government of India and Pharmacy Council of India (PCI) in 2008. It is a post-graduate professional doctorate of 6 years which includes 5 years of study and 1 year of internship or residency. It was introduced to improve clinical pharmacy services in the country and is the only service which is in direct contact with the patient health care system. The first batch of post-baccalaureate PharmD students graduated in August 2011 and the first regular batch graduated in June 2014. The PharmD degree requires 5 years of classroom and hospital-based didactic study (two years didactic post-baccalaureate course), followed by one year of internship training in hospitals in addition to ongoing practicals and finishing a research project.

With reference to the clarification on the PharmD qualification and designation of "Dr." for graduates, it was clarified to all universities that the PharmD is a post-graduate degree and passing students can directly register for a PhD from 2012. With all the changes made to the degree, it is still only approved by the PCI, as the National Medical Commission (NMC) does not recognize the degree in India. After the Amendment in August 2019, it is now compulsory for hospitals to develop a DIC (Drug Information Centre). It will be head by a PharmD graduate; similarly, another cadre was created, the "Clinical Pharmacist". The only minimum educational qualification required for the cadre is the PharmD. The Clinical Pharmacist must also assist the physician and other medical representatives to promote the wellness and correct use of medications for patients.

=== Nepal ===
Nepal started three years post baccalaureate Pharm.D in 2010 in Department of Pharmacy, Kathmandu University, Dhulikhel, Kavre. It is the first batch in Nepal pursuing the degree. The first batch is now currently involved in a 1 years internship at different well established teaching hospitals of Nepal. The students are enrolled in Manipal Teaching Hospital, Pokhara, College of Medical Sciences Bharatpur and KIST medical College, Lalitpur for their internship of 1 year. Kathmandu University has already enrolled the next two batches for further continuation of the Pharm D program.

=== Pakistan ===
Pharmacy Council of Pakistan (PCP) is the professional regulatory authority for Pharmacists in Pakistan. Earlier (before 2003), pharmacy degree was a 4-year undergraduate B.Pharmacy (Bachelor of Pharmacy) that focused mainly on drug manufacturing and pharmaceutics but later in 2004, Higher Education Commission of Pakistan and Pharmacy Council of Pakistan collaboratively changed the syllabus and upgraded the B.Pharmacy degree to Pharm.D. Pharm.D (Doctor of Pharmacy) is a 5-year professional degree in Pakistan. Admission requirements for Pharm.D is 12-years of schooling or HSSC (Higher Secondary School Certificate) in pre-medical subjects (Biology, Chemistry and Physics etc.) or A-levels in similar subjects. Passing an aptitude test is mandatory for getting admission into Pharm.D program. As compared to B.Pharm., Pharm.D is a more clinical and research oriented program. Some pharmacy institutes have collaboration with hospitals for providing clinical clerkship during 4th & 5th Professional year. In 2008, first batch completed Pharm.D program.

=== Philippines ===
Centro Escolar University Makati offers the degree Doctor of Pharmacy (Pharm.D.). The degree requires the completion of 52 units of formal course work and 36 units of clinical rotation done at the Makati Medical Center and The Medical City. It is a 2-year first postbaccalaureate degree open to licensed pharmacists in the Philippines.

=== Taiwan ===
In Taiwan, Doctor of Pharmacy (Pharm. D.) program was first introduced in National Taiwan University since Fall 2009.

PharmD program in Taiwan is a six-year academic program, while Bachelor of Science in pharmacy (BSc. Pharm.) is a four-year or five-year program. Students taking either PharmD or BSc Pharm. program are all eligible to take the pharmacist licensure exam. The universities offering Pharm. D. program or BSc. Pharm. program are listed below.

University	PharmD (6-year program)	BSc Pharm (4-year program)	BSc Pharm (5-year program)	Notes
National Taiwan University	V	Stopped offering in fall 2014.		Currently only PharmD program is available.
National Yang Ming Chiao Tung University	V			Since fall 2016.
Taipei Medical University	V	V		Pharm. D. program is available since fall 2013. Currently both programs are available to students.
National Defense Medical Center	V	Stopped offering in fall 2015.		Currently only PharmD program is available.
National Cheng Kung University	V			Since fall 2015.
China Medical University	V		V	Students can select whether they want to join PharmD program after admission.
Kaohsiung Medical University		Stopped offering in fall 2019.	V (since fall 2019)	5-year program will start in fall 2019.
Chia Nan University of Pharmacy & Science		Stopped offering in fall 2018.	V	5-year program started in fall 2018.
Tajen University	V		V	PharmD program is available since fall 2016. Currently both programs are available to students.

=== Thailand ===
In Thailand, Doctor of Pharmacy (Pharmaceutical Care) program first curriculum in Asia was established at Faculty of Pharmaceutical Sciences, Chulalongkorn University in 1913. The PharmD Program (Pharmaceutical care or Industrial Pharmacy) is a six-year academic program.

== Australia ==
In Australia, all university qualifications are mapped to the Australian Qualification Framework (AQF). Coursework degrees that are offered that can lead to initial registration as a pharmacist include:

- Bachelor's degree (an AQF Level 7)
- Bachelor's degree with honours (an AQF level 8)
- Master's degree (an AQF level 9)
- Master's degree (an AQF extended level 9).

In Australia, an extended level 9 master's programmes must be granted an exemption to be awarded using the title "Doctor". Only extended level 9 master's programmes for medicine, dentistry, veterinary science, law, physiotherapy, optometry and podiatry were named as exemptions to be able to offer an extended level 9 master's programme as a Doctor of Pharmacy. Pharmacy was only added to the exemption list in December 2024, so prior to this there was no avenue for any university to award a Doctor of Pharmacy.

All programmes of study leading to initial registration as a pharmacist must be accredited by the Australian Pharmacy Council (APC). After completing their accredited qualifying degree, graduates are required to undertake a one-year internship during which they are provisionally registered as pharmacists before being able to practice independently. Most accredited programs were a three-year Bachelor of Pharmacy (AQF Level 7) until the mid-1990s when programmes transitioned to a four-year Bachelor of Pharmacy (AQF Level 7). Universities progressed to offering entry-level programmes that were four-year Bachelor of Pharmacy (Honours) (AQF Level 8) or graduate entry Master of Pharmacy (AQF Level 9). The University of Western Australia was the first pharmacy program that graduated students with an extended level 9 master's, starting in 2005. By 2024, The University of Western Australia, Charles Darwin University and Griffith University were the only three universities that delivered an entry to practice extended level 9 master's degree. Students enrolled in or pharmacists who had graduated from an extended level 9 masteres were likely unaware that they had an extended level 9 master's rather than a level 9 master's prior to 2024 as the name of the course for both was a Master of Pharmacy.

=== Current Universities offering an entry to practice Doctor of Pharmacy ===
Students who graduate from a Doctor of Pharmacy in Australia can use the postnomial DPharm after completing this qualification. They are entitled to use the Dr title. After completing the Doctor of Pharmacy, graduates are required to undertake a one-year internship during which they are provisionally registered as pharmacists before being able to practice independently.

The University of Western Australia is currently the only university offering a four-year degree for school leavers to enrol into a Doctor of Pharmacy program. Students enrol into a course known as a four-year double degree that combines the Bachelor of Human Sciences and Doctor of Pharmacy so students graduate with two degrees after the four years of study that includes the DPharm. The University of Western Australia also offers direct entry into a two-year postgraduate Doctor of Pharmacy for entry to practice for people who already hold a bachelor's degree. Charles Darwin University also offers direct entry into a two-year postgraduate Doctor of Pharmacy.

=== Opportunity for existing pharmacists to earn a Doctor of Pharmacy ===
Existing pharmacists who graduated with a Bachelor's, Bachelors with Honours or a master's degree may wish to upgrade their qualifications to a Doctor of Pharmacy. A conversion course that allowed an existing registered pharmacist to upgrade their qualification through a postgraduate course would similarly allow them to use the honorific title Dr and to use the postnomial DPharm.

The Pharmacy Guild of Australia have stated that they expect there to be a one-year Doctor of Pharmacy programme provided by Australian universities to allow the existing workforce to upskill in Medication Management Reviews, Aged Care Onsite Pharmacy, Vaccination and Prescribing programs. They expect this one year qualification to "retrofit" the existing workforce to ensure that all pharmacists are able to deliver the extended services.

The University of Western Australia has announced a one-year Doctor of Pharmacy Practice for practicing registered pharmacists. Completion of this course will enable pharmacists to use the title doctor and the postnomial DPharm. The course will consist of eight subjects that will lead to credentialling in prescribing, diabetes education, medication management reviews and aged care onsite pharmacy. Pharmacists can elect to undertake individual microcredentials to complete the required subjects prior to deciding to enrol in the degree. Alternatively, they can enrol directly into the degree and complete the qualification through undertaking the required units. The demand is anticipated to be high for pharmacists wanting to enrol in to the course and convert their existing undergraduate qualifications to a Doctor of Pharmacy. The announcement of this course is expected to see a large number of pharmacists undertake the pathway to become credentialled as diabetes educators and medication management review and aged care pharmacists as well as prescribers and vaccinators. The new course was positively received by the pharmacy profession with high demand anticipated, though with the expected antipathy from the medical profession who are dissatisfied that another profession can earn the DPharm title.

== Europe ==
=== Belgium ===
The education of pharmacists in Belgium requires a minimum of five years of university study. EU-harmonisation has led to division into three bachelor and two master years. A bachelor title is, however, not used at all professionally. Belgium considers the educational level of their current (M.Sc.) degree in pharmacy to be comparable to the Pharm.D. title used in the United States. To become a hospital pharmacist, a three-year residency program has to be completed after obtaining the M.Sc. in pharmaceutical sciences.

=== Czech Republic and Slovakia ===
In both countries, the PharmDr. (Pharmaciae doctor) diploma can be obtained by pharmacists who have previously graduated in pharmacy (Magister, Mgr.) (the undergraduate study of pharmacy takes five years). Applicants must defend a research or experimental thesis, and pass a rigorous examination. The PharmDr. title is highly prestigious and written in front of the name. It is different from the postgraduate Ph.D. degree.

=== France ===
In France, Pharm.D studies can only be accessed through a competitive examination ("concours", with numerus apertus) happening at the end of the first year of health studies. Most candidates hold a Scientific Baccalaureate from the equivalent to high schools (lycée). Yearly success rate depends on the university's current numerus clausus and the number or registered students, ranging from 10 to 30% bearing in mind that second-time participants are three to four times more likely to succeed than students trying for the first time.

In order to obtain the state diploma of "Doctor of Pharmacy", the studies last a minimum of six years, or nine years for students choosing residency (hospital pharmacy or medical biology). It is accessible through another competitive exam, even more selective. It lasts four years and gives another diploma of specialist like in medicine (DES for "diplôme d'études spécialisées" ). Students must specialise whithin the 4th year, and choose between dispensing pharmacy, pharmaceutical industry or hospital residency. In any case, a 12-month part-time hospital externship is mandatory during the fifth year, although some flexibility is possible for students choosing industry.

Sixth year for industry is generally dedicated to further specialisation with a former Professional master's degree or a former Research master's degree including internship.

In France, since the harmonization of European Union in September 2005, the student who chooses the industry/research orientation have a six-month period of part-time hospital externship, and 3 to 6 months of full-time training in a pharmaceutical industry or a research lab.

=== Hungary ===
In Hungary, pharmacists obtain their master's degree, after five years of study. In the fifth year, students must undergo a professional training, that lasts for two+three months (autumn and spring) in a public pharmacy and one month in a hospital. At the end of this period, the student must pass a nationwide exam to be legally entitled for practicing the profession of pharmacy, after acquiring the pharmacist work license. According to the new law in 2008, which is valid from 2009, all pharmacists, who have acquired the master's degree of pharmacy, are entitled to the Doctor of Pharmacy.

=== Italy ===
In order to obtain the state diploma of "Doctor of Pharmacy", the studies last a minimum of 5 years, or 9 years for students choosing residency (hospital pharmacy, medical biology) or pharmacology. In Italy the Professional degree in Pharmacy lasts 5 years, which includes a 6-month professional training in a public pharmacy or hospital. At the end of this period, the student must pass a nationwide exam to be legally entitled to practise as a pharmacist. The subscription to "Pharmacist's Order", or in Italian "Ordine dei Farmacisti", is required for working in private and public pharmacies or hospitals. It is not required if the pharmacist is working at a pharmaceutical company. Besides the professional degree in pharmacy, the title of Doctor of Pharmacy can be achieved in Italy by obtaining a MSc in Medicinal Chemistry and Pharmaceutical Technology (Chimica e Tecnologia Farmaceutiche, CTF) and then subscribing to the "Pharmacist's Order".

=== Malta ===
In Malta, the warrant to practice as a pharmacist is given after the Master of Pharmacy course is completed successfully. The University of Malta, however, offers a Level 8 Postgraduate Degree known as the Doctorate in Pharmacy (PharmD) which expands the pharmacist's knowledge on clinical, pharmacoeconomic, and regulatory aspects. The Doctorate in Pharmacy course is offered in collaboration with the University of Illinois in Chicago and uses a mixed-approach learning programme including theory and practical experience.

=== Netherlands ===
The education of pharmacists in the Netherlands requires a minimum of six years of university study. EU-harmonisation has led to division into three bachelor and three master years. A bachelor title is, however, not used at all professionally. The Dutch consider the educational level of their current (M.Sc.) degree in pharmacy to be comparable to the PharmD-title in use in the United States. Before the harmonization, a four-year Master of Science was superseded by two more years of university education preparing for pharmacy practice. To become a hospital pharmacist, a four-year residency program has to be completed after that.

=== Portugal ===
In Portugal, studies consists of four years of basic school, five years of preparatory school, and three years of high school, where afterward the student is submitted to nationwide exams for their university application. The process is the same for every degree the student chooses, from medicine to pharmacy to engineering. The student takes the master's degree in Pharmaceutical Sciences (equivalent to the PharmD program) in one of the nine Pharmacy faculties with their own respective numerous clausus which comprises a six-year rigorous study (5 year as an integrated master's according to the EU system) and a professional internship. Finished the degree, the academic title of Doctor of Pharmacy is issued. The graduate can then enroll in the regulatory institution for the Pharmacist profession in Portugal called, "Portuguese Pharmaceutical Society" or, in Portuguese, "Ordem dos Farmacêuticos". After the enrollment, the title of Pharmacist is issued. Afterwards, Pharmacists can start their career in a limitless number of professional areas that range from community pharmacies, drug development, fundamental or applied research, biotechnology to areas such as forensic sciences, toxicology, regulatory affairs, clinical analysis, law enforcement (scientific police), bromatology, drug marketing, regulatory authorities, university teachers, etc. The Pharmacists can also choose to become a specialist in one of following areas of activity: Pharmaceutical Industry, Regulatory Affairs, Hospital Pharmacy, and Clinical Analysis. Each specialization requires an additional 5-year professional study program guided by a tutor in the respective area of knowledge. This training includes regular evaluations by the professional competent authority ("Ordem dos Farmacêuticos"), which also requires an exam at the end of the 5-year training. After the success at the exam, the Pharmacist then becomes a specialist in its area of expertise.

=== Slovenia ===
Faculty of Pharmacy in Ljubljana provides reformed or new Bologna study programmes. For the study of pharmacy, the 5+0 uniform master's studies lasts 5 years—first and second cycles combined. Students have 5 months of pharmacy practice in their last year at the university. After completing master's studies, it is possible to continue and finish one of a number of Specialist study programmes. Those are intended for the candidates who have finished the university pharmacy programme and passed the professional examination or Uniform master's study programme Pharmacy. Those programmes are: Medicinals design, Medicinals testing, Clinical pharmacy, Pharmacognosy, Community pharmacy or Clinical chemistry (Medical Biochemistry). All specialist study programmes, except for Clinical chemistry, include training which lasts 36 months, with the theoretical part (1st year) in the form of lectures and exams within the Bologna third cycle studies, and the experimental part in suitable departments of pharmaceutical industry, pharmacies, institutions and faculties. After successful completion of the programme, the student must write their specialist thesis and pass the specialist exam in order to be granted the academic title for the appropriate field. The Specialist study programme Clinical chemistry includes training lasting 48 months in the form of lectures within the Bologna third cycle studies, and a professional part in the laboratories of specialization institutions authorized by the Ministry of Health. It is concluded by the specialist (theoretical and practical) exam. The gained title Specialist of Medicinal Biochemistry is equivalent to (and formally and legally acknowledged as) the title European Specialist of Clinical Chemistry and Laboratory Diagnostics.

=== Spain ===
In Spain, Pharmacy studies can be accessed after completing five and a half years of university college (with at least 6 months of initiation to Pharmacy Practice). The Licenciado en Farmacia or Grado en Farmacia (equivalent to the PharmD-program) English degree is the only title that allows holders to practice the profession of Pharmacy in Spain. To become a Hospital Pharmacist a person with a degree in Pharmacy must enter a selection process (national selection process called FIR) to initiate a Pharmacy Residency period of professional training during 4 additional years (including one full year of advanced clinical practice in different medical wards). Apart from the professional degrees, like with any other university studies, Pharmacy degree allows holders to pursue an academic career by enrolling master's and doctorates programs (MSc and PhD) in several scientific fields (pharmaceutical technology, pharmacokinetics and biopharmaceutics, biomedical sciences, cosmetics & pharmaceutical industry, pharmaceutical and organic chemistry, physical chemistry, food sciences, pharmacology, toxicology, public health, etc.). Master's usually lasts 1–2 years and PhD no less than 4 years.

In summary, in Spain an entry-level pharmacy degree lasts 5 years and a Hospital Pharmacy Specialist needs 9.5 years of education and/or training. Hospital Pharmacy residents are paid during their residency period. There are other residencies available to pharmacists such as Medical Biology, Clinical Biochemistry, Immunology, Microbiology, Radiopharmacy, Pharmaceutical Analysis, and Industrial Pharmacy lasting from 2 to 4 years.

Pharmacists usually work as retail pharmacists (private practice), hospital pharmacists, primary care pharmacists, medical biologists, scientists (private and public biomedical research institutions), as university professors (Pharmacy, Medicine, Biology, Food Sciences, Biochemistry, Veterinary, Nursing, etc.), and as technicians and executive managers (pharmaceutical and biotechnology companies and governmental institutions).

=== Sweden ===
In Sweden, Pharmacy Doctors could be considered equal to those who have earned a master's degree in pharmacy and are actively licensed to work as a pharmacist. The master's program typically takes students 5 years to complete, which prepares students for careers in pharmacies, the pharmaceutical industry, and, more recently, clinical pharmacy. Students who have earned their master's degree in pharmacy can also choose to further specialize themselves with a wide range of Ph.D. programs, which are offered at universities in Uppsala, Gothenburg, and Umeå

A special license which is issued by Socialstyrelsen is required in order to work in healthcare as a pharmacist (i.e. as a pharmacy clerk or a clinical pharmacist),

Sweden does not refer to licensed and practicing pharmacists as pharmacy doctors. Instead, pharmacists refer to themselves as apotekare or farmaceuter, which is an informal academic title referring to their master's degree in pharmacy.

There is a severe shortage of pharmacists in Sweden. In 2018, the shortage was the highest ever.

=== Switzerland ===
The education of pharmacists in Switzerland also follows the EU-harmonisation with three bachelor and two master years. A bachelor title is, however, not used at all professionally. A federal exam is required in addition to the master's degree in order to practice. Switzerland considers the educational level of their current (M.Sc.) degree in pharmacy and the federal degree to be equivalent to the Pharm.D. title used in the United States. The pharmacists have indeed a research and a clinical experience during their degree.

== Middle East ==
=== Iran ===
The master's degree in Pharmacy was available at Tehran University since 1926. In 1930, Tehran University changed the Pharmacy degree from a master's to a doctorate, and the duration of the study was increased to 5 years. Currently, in Iranian universities, graduates need to present and defend their thesis in different fields of pharmacy, and this adds another year to their studies, and generally after 6 years, students can graduate as a Doctor in Pharmacy. In Iran, PharmD is one of the most prestigious and competitive academic paths, consistently ranking alongside Medicine and Dentistry as a "top-tier" field. It is a rigorous professional program that blends basic sciences, clinical expertise, and industrial technology. Entry into a PharmD program is notoriously difficult in Iran. Iranian high school students must take the National University Entrance Exam, known as the Konkoor (from the French Concours), and the top 1% to 2% students in the Experimental Sciences (Biology) track can often secure a seat in public pharmacy schools. Once admitted, students undergo a 6-year program (approximately 190–210 credits). The focus of the first two years is basic sciences (Organic Chemistry, Biochemistry, Physiology, Anatomy, etc.). After finishing basic sciences, students must pass a mandatory national "Comprehensive Pharmacy Exam" to continue into specialized clinical and industrial courses (e.g. Medicinal Chemistry, Pharmaceutics, Pharmacology, Pharmacognosy, Pharmacotherapy & Clinical Pharmacy, etc.). In the 6th year, students complete rotations in community and hospital pharmacies and must defend a doctoral research thesis to graduate. After earning the PharmD, many pharmacists choose to specialize. This requires passing another highly competitive national residency entrance exam, adding 3 to 4 more years of studying and training. Various universities such as Shahid Beheshti University of Medical Sciences, Shiraz University of Medical Sciences, Isfahan University of Medical Sciences, Mazandaran University of Medical Sciences, and Kerman University of Medical Sciences offer PharmD program in Iran.

=== Iraq ===
Founded in 1936, the College of Pharmacy at the University of Baghdad, had a graduating class of 12 students. By 1993, the number of disciplines offered in the college expanded to the chemistry pharmaceuticals, pharmacists, drugs and medicinal plants, and drugs and toxins, and the laboratory sciences, clinical, and clinical pharmacy. The period of study at the college is 5 years. The college follows the seasonal semester system where the academic year is made up of 2 independent semester courses. This system is accredited by the MOHE for all pharmacy colleges in Iraq.

Al-Hadba University also offers a bachelor's degree in pharmacy. The college of pharmacy at Al-Hadba University's program consists of 5 years of study divided across 10 semesters.

The ministry of higher education in Kurdistan region established the Faculty of Pharmacy at Knowledge University in 2020 in Erbil City of Kurdistan Region of Iraq. It is five years under-graduate program that is designed according to the Bologna system which includes updated courses in pharmaceutics, clinical pharmacy, clinical pharmacokinetics, therapeutics, pharmaceutical chemistry, pharmaceutical analysis, pharmacology, pharmacoeconomic, toxicology, pharmacognosy, clinical microbiology, clinical biochemistry, physiology, pathology, histology, human biology, genetics, immunology, anatomy, hospital training, and quality control, in addition to courses in English, mathematics, and computer science.

=== Israel ===
In Israel the PharmD-program is offered only by the Hebrew University of Jerusalem. Unlike the United States and European countries, in order to practice pharmacy in Israel, only a bachelor's degree is required.

=== Palestine ===
In Palestine, the PharmD-program is offered by the Birzeit University also in Al-Najah University as a bachelor program. The program takes a duration of 6 years with the sixth year as a practicum year. PharmD-program faces challenges with legislation in Palestine, it is not fully approved as a major and it is not given its full value, instead graduates can fill employment positions such as pharmacists or pharmacists assistant.

=== Jordan ===
In Jordan, the PharmD-program is offered by the University of Jordan, this link has videos of all programs available at the school of pharmacy of the University of Jordan, and Jordan University of Science and Technology at the undergraduate level. This program is not to be confused with the BSc in Pharmacy program even though both programs are still offered today. Students complete 5 years of academic work and 1 year of clinical practice to earn the degree. This program is offered at public universities only: at the University of Jordan and Jordan University of Science and Technology. The University of Jordan calls this degree BSc in Doctor of Pharmacy, which is granted after successful completion of 216 credit hours. The Jordan University of Science and Technology has a similar credit hour requirement and calls the degree the BSc. of Doctor of Pharmacy degree.

=== Lebanon ===
Pharmacy degree is awarded by several Lebanese universities (upon a decree by the Lebanese government).

The Lebanese American University awards a Doctor of Pharmacy (Pharm.D.) degree that is accredited by the ACPE. The program extends over six years (two years of pre-pharmacy and four professional years).

=== Qatar ===
In Qatar, pharmacy degrees are offered by the new College of Pharmacy at Qatar University. Students were accepted into the 5-year BSc (Pharm) program commencing in 2007. Students will be accepted into the final year of the 6-year Pharm.D program in 2011. Accordingly, the first graduates of the Pharm.D program are expected in 2012. The program adopts a Canadian curriculum and received early accreditation by the Canadian Council for Accreditation of Pharmacy Programs (CCAPP) in February 2009. This is the first international program to undergo review and receive accreditation by this sole Canadian accreditation agency.

=== Saudi Arabia ===
Started in 2001 at King Abdulaziz University, then in 2005 at Ibn-Sina National College, then 2006 at KFU, then 2007 at Qassim University. In 2008, King Saud University College of Pharmacy at Riyadh, College of Pharmacy at Kharj, and Taif University. In 2009, Almaarefa College started their Pharm.D. program, and Shaqra University in 2011.

The degree duration in Saudi Arabia is six years in total, including one academic year of clinical rotations. According to the Saudi Commission for Health Specialties, if a student graduates with a (minimum six years) Pharm.D. degree, then the graduate has the chance to further develop himself. This can be achieved by taking an Accredited Residency Training Program that is at least one year long (for a total of seven years, minimum). Upon successfully completing both the Residency program and the Pharm.D., the graduate can apply for Professional Equivalent (only equivalent in practice) to the master's degree in pharmacy.

The Pharm.D degree is now offered by almost all pharmacy colleges in Saudi Arabia. This is a transitional period as this degree will replace the conventional Bachelor of pharmacy degree in the near future and the old bachelor's degree will be phased out.

=== United Arab Emirates ===
The Doctor of Pharmacy program started in 2008 by the College of Pharmacy, at Gulf Medical University, Ajman. and it is accredited by the ministry of education accreditation

== North America ==
=== Canada ===
Currently, in Canada, the BPharm (and not Pharm.D.) is the minimum qualification required to practice pharmacy. In Canada the Pharm.D. program is offered in both English and French, and as a first professional degree as well as a postgraduate degree. Students enrolled in the program must have graduated from a CCAPP (Canadian Council for Accreditation of Pharmacy Programs) or an ACPE (Accreditation Council for Pharmacy Education) school with an accredited teaching program or must have obtained a Certificate of Qualification from PEBC.

As of 2007, the PharmD professional degree program in French is offered at the Université de Montréal and, as of 2011, at the Université Laval. The Université de Montréal was the first Canadian university to offer the Pharm.D. program as a first professional degree instead of the BPharm in pharmacy. In 2013, the University of Alberta would be offering a Pharm.D. as a post-professional degree, and a BPharm is required for admission into the program. The University of Toronto replaced their entry-level BPharm curriculum with an entry-to-practice Pharm.D. curriculum in 2011, with approval being granted in 2013.

The PharmD. degree is also offered as an undergraduate professional degree at the University of British Columbia and the University of Toronto. However, since 2020, most, if not all Canadian Pharmacy schools have changed their Entry-To-Practice programs that awarded successful graduates with a Bachelor of Pharmaceutical Sciences to Entry-To-Practice PharmD as the scope of practice for pharmacists continue to expand and change. Since this change, UBC no longer has a separate 2-year Pharm.D. Program that is offered.

On 23 January 2013, the government of Ontario approved the University of Toronto and the University of Waterloo applications for the entry-to-practice Doctor of Pharmacy (Pharm.D.) program. Students graduating in 2015 was the first cohort under this new undergraduate Pharm.D. program.

Dalhousie University (Halifax, Nova Scotia) is in progress of transitioning to the Pharm.D. program. Undergraduate applicants will require a minimum two years of prerequisite courses.

In the Fall of 2017, Memorial University of Newfoundland (St. John's, Newfoundland and Labrador), also replaced their BPharm program with the Pharm.D. program, with the first graduating class expected in 2022. This program requires one full year of prerequisite courses.

In the Fall of 2018, the University of Alberta (Edmonton, Alberta) replaced their four-year BSc. Pharm program with an entry to practise PharmD. program, also with the first graduating class expected in April 2022. However, since the spring of 2017 the university has offered current BSc. Pharm students the ability to bridge to the PharmD. program. This requires the students to take two extra summer semesters between their third and fourth years, as well as an extra 16 weeks of clinical rotations during their fourth year. Only students graduating between 2018 and 2021 will have had this option. As a result, currently the university is offering 3 possible means to obtain a PharmD degree. That is the 2 year PharmD program for practising pharmacists, those in the PharmD for BSc. Pharm students (PBS), and those in the entry to practise PharmD program. BSc. Pharm students who did not enrol in the PBS program between 2018 and 2021 will be the final students to graduate with a bachelor's degree from the faculty.

=== United States ===
The Doctor of Pharmacy (Pharm.D.) is a professional degree that offers opportunities in research, teaching, clinical practice, industry, manufacturing, judicial, and a multitude of other areas. Six pharmacy schools in the U.S. still offer a high school student to enroll directly into the School of Pharmacy for a six-year PharmD. degree. In most other Schools of Pharmacy, after completing the required prerequisites or obtaining a transferable bachelor's degree, pharmacy school is another four years. In general, the total collegiate timeline to become an entry-level pharmacist is six to eight years; three to four years undergraduate prerequisite is a bachelor's degree then 3 to 4 years (accelerated track) professional doctorate.

Acceptance to a Pharm.D. program is competitive. Along with excellent natural science grades, most schools require students to take a pharmacy college admissions test (PCAT) and complete 90 credit hours of university coursework in the sciences, mathematics, composition, and humanities before entry into the Pharm.D. program. Due to the extensive admission requirements and highly competitive nature of the field, many pharmacy students complete a bachelor's degree before entry to pharmacy school. Some institutions still offer six-year accelerated Pharm.D. programs (similar to six-year MD programs).

Residency is an option that is typically one to two years in length. Graduating candidates typically apply their final year of the Pharm.D. program. The accrediting body for most residency positions is the American Society of Health-System Pharmacists. Applications are submitted through the Pharmacy Online Residency Centralized Application Service; which opens November 3 each residency year. Residency sites interview candidates and a ranking occurs prior to a match process. "The match" is facilitated via the National Matching Services Inc. in conjunction with Pharmacy Online Residency Centralized Application Service website portal. A residency is useful; especially for new graduates who do not yet have adequate patient care experience or potentially seeking accelerated and additional experiential training.

An ACPE Accredited Doctorate of Pharmacy (Pharm.D.) is currently the only degree accepted by the National Association of Boards of Pharmacy (NABP) to be eligible to "sit" for the North American Pharmacist Licensure Examination (NAPLEX).

==== History ====
Previously, the United States had a five-year bachelor's degree in pharmacy. Up until the School of Pharmacy graduating class of 1964, in most states (with the exception of a few on the West Coast), the requirement to sit for a pharmacy license was four years of a licensed College of Pharmacy concentrating in the practice of pharmacy during much of that time. The incoming class of 1961, in anywhere but the West Coast, was required to take a five-year university course, culminating in a Bachelor of Science degree in pharmacy. In most Schools of Pharmacy, that meant two years pre-pharmacy and three years in the actual School of Pharmacy, with graduation in 1966, although some schools were either 1 and 4 or 3 and 2.

The current Pharm.D. degree curriculum is considerably different from that of the prior B.S. in pharmacy. It now includes extensive didactic clinical preparation, hands-on clinical practice experience in a wider array of healthcare settings, and a greater emphasis on clinical pharmacy practice pertaining to pharmacotherapy optimization. Requirements in the US to becoming a pharmacist include graduating with a Doctor of Pharmacy from an ACPE accredited program, conducting a specified number of hours in internship under a licensed pharmacist (i.e. 1,800 hours in some states), passing the NAPLEX, and passing a Multistate Pharmacy Jurisprudence Examination (MPJE).

For pharmacy graduates holding the Bachelor of Science degrees currently licensed in the United States wishing to attain the Pharm.D., there are programs available to bridge that gap. These programs are fully accredited by the ACPE but are only available to current B.S.Pharm. graduates with a license to practice pharmacy in the United States.

=== Mexico ===
The pharmacy program in Mexico is similar to that of Spain's program but differs vastly from its neighbors up north in the United States and Canada.

== South America ==
=== Brazil ===
In Brazil the title of pharmacist is awarded after completion of certified graduate studies; while the term Pharm.D. is not formally regulated it can be used and is commonly added to the graduate's professional license (issued by the regional pharmacy (Conselho Regional de Farmacia)).

Many universities award sub-titles or co-titles including Biochemist and Industrial Pharmacist. University of São Paulo and a few others have awarded specialization titles for many years for their Pharmacy and Biochemistry graduate students, including toxicological and clinical analysis, food and nutrition and industrial pharmacy, which are also equivalent to different degrees in the US and Europe.

Whereas Bachelor of Pharmacy takes a minimum of 4 years, the Pharmacist-Biochemist degree is completed by 4 and 1/2 years of full-time studies with at least 720 hours of internship. The student can opt to get the degree during evening and it takes 6 years with Saturday classes (full day) and also at least 720 hrs of internship.

Although many universities grant a degree of Doctor in Pharmaceutical Sciences or Doctor in Pharmacy after completion of original research dissertation, those are not professional but a post-graduate course and do not grant permission to work as a pharmacist.

=== Chile ===
In Chile, the title of Pharmacist (Quimico Farmaceutico) is granted after completing 10 or 11 semesters of full-time studies in an accredited University. The Pharmacist degree is a Professional Degree, awarded after finishing 5.5–6 years of study (Bachelor in Pharmacy or Pharmaceutical Sciences), and then finish an internship of 6 months on the specialization area of the student (Pharmaceutical Lab, Community Pharmacy, Hospital Pharmacy) and/or a scientific thesis. The Chilean pharmacy professional degree of Químico Farmaceutico (Q.F.) is generally equivalent to the degree of PharmD.

The pharmacist can get a Master in Pharmaceutical Sciences (MSc), of 2 years, or a Doctorate in Pharmacology (PhD), of 4 years after finished the Bachelor. These are Academic Degrees, needed for scientific career on investigation, but are not required to work in other professional areas.

=== Colombia ===
In Colombia, the title of Pharmacist (Quimico Farmaceutico) is granted after completing 10 semesters of full-time studies in an accredited University. The Pharmacist degree is a Professional Degree. While the term Pharm.D. is not formally regulated it can be used and is commonly added to the graduate's professional license (issued by the Colegio Nacional de Quimicos Farmaceuticos de Colombia).

== See also ==
- List of pharmacy schools
- Pharmacy residency
