= Clinical pathology =

Medical specialty

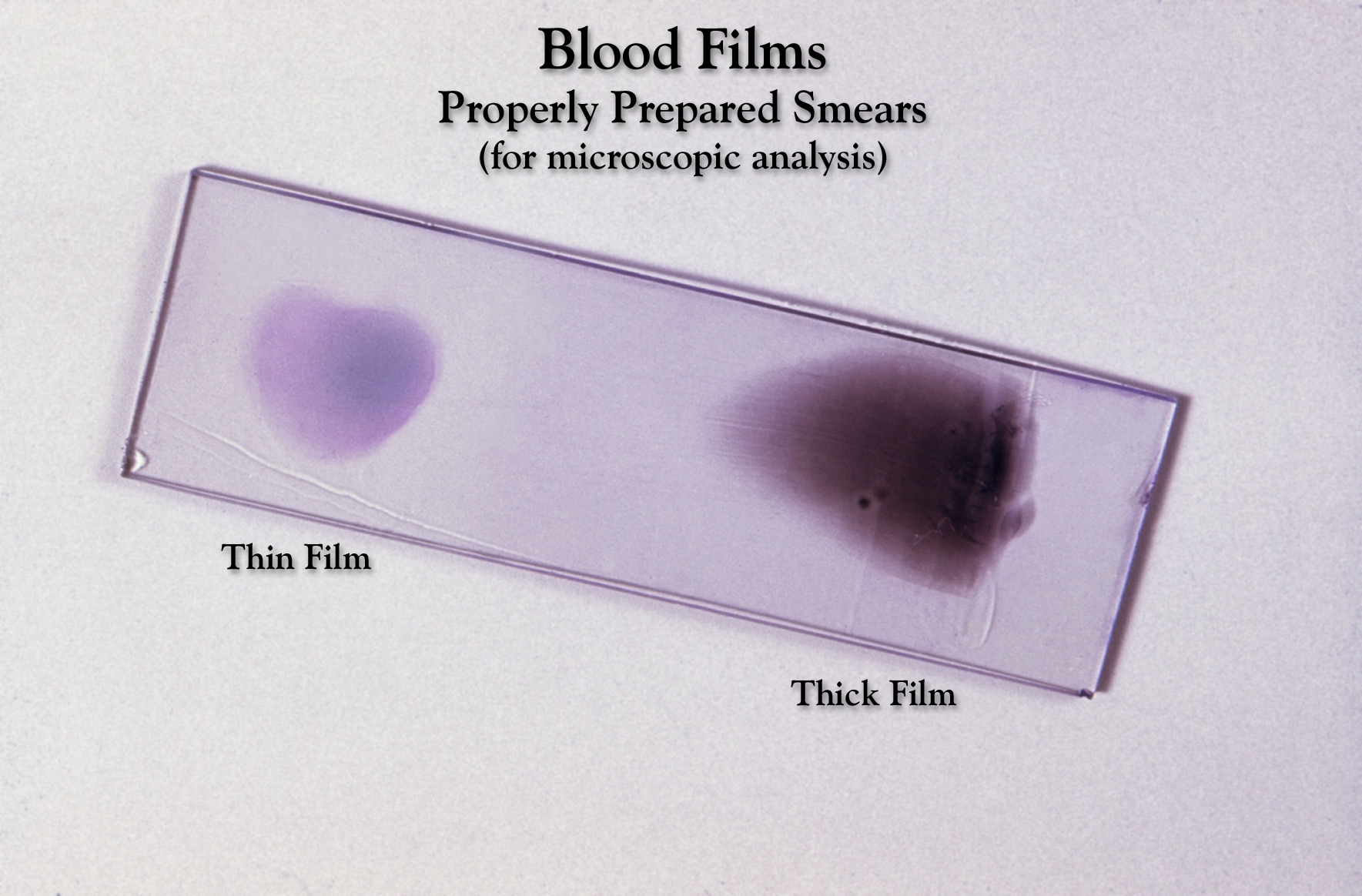
Hematology: Blood smears on a glass slide, stained and ready to be examined under the microscope.

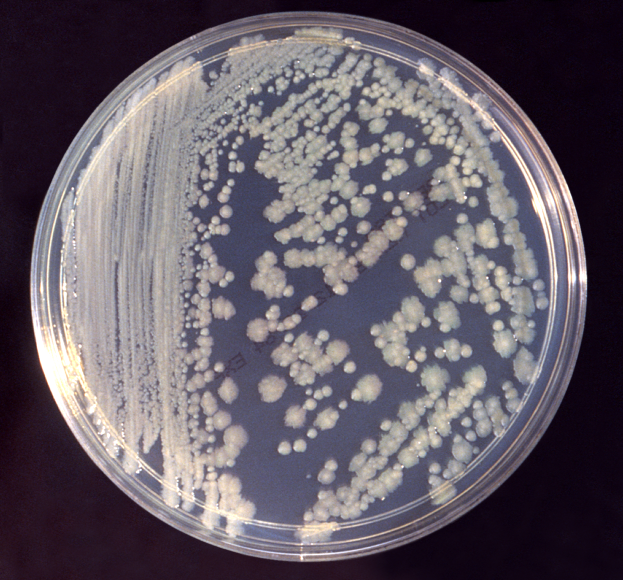
Bacteriology: Agar plate with bacterial colonies.

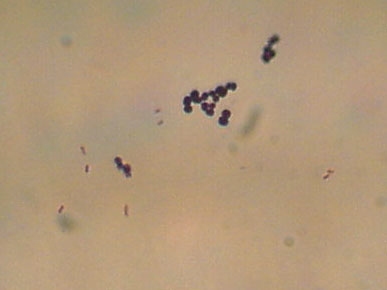
Bacteriology: microscopic image of a mixture of two types of bacteria stained with the Gram stain.

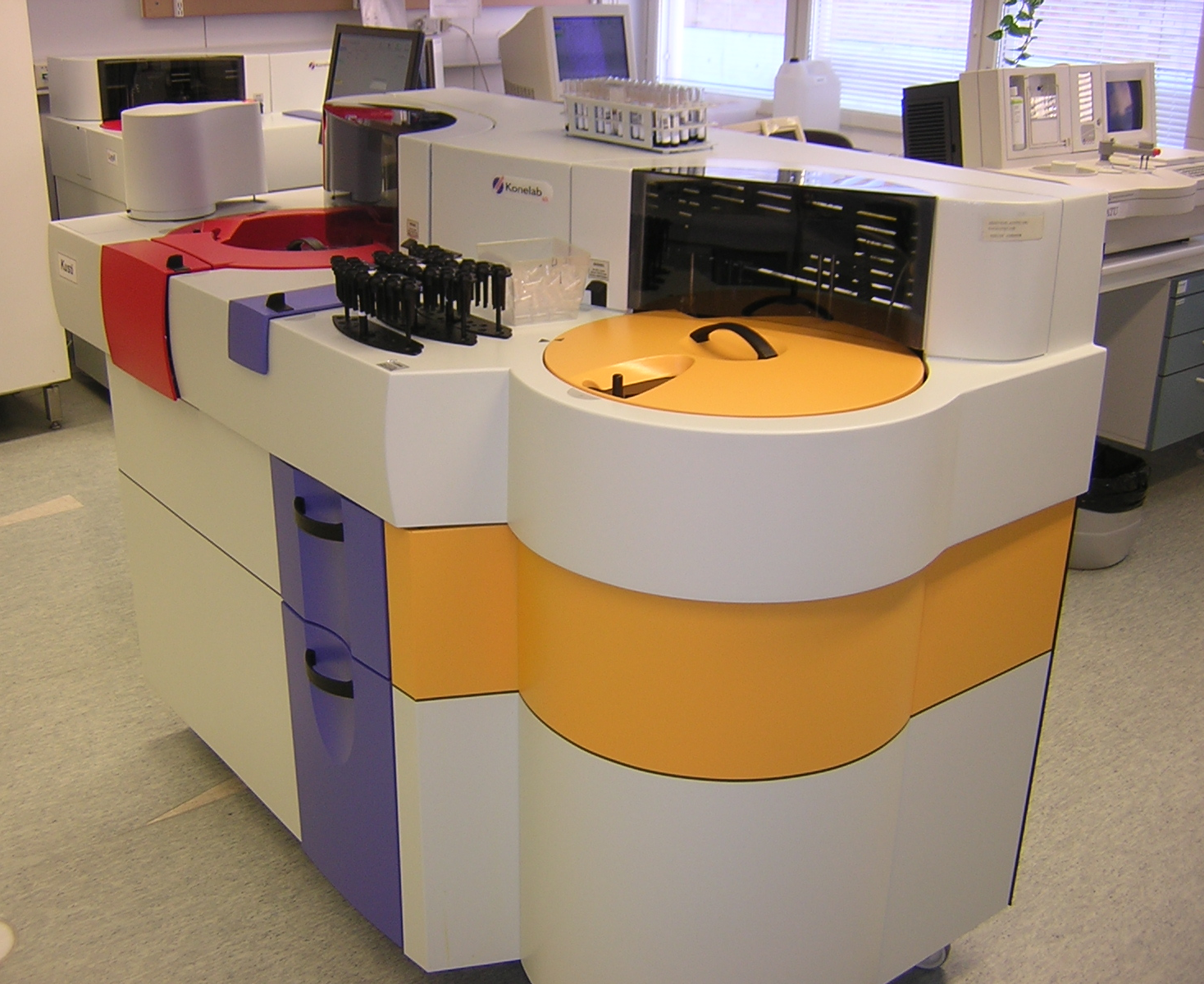
Clinical chemistry: an automated blood chemistry analyser.

Clinical pathology is a medical specialty that is concerned with the diagnosis of disease based on the laboratory analysis of bodily fluids, such as blood, urine, and tissue homogenates or extracts using the tools of chemistry, microbiology, hematology, molecular pathology, and Immunohaematology. This specialty requires a medical residency.

Clinical pathology is a term used in the US, UK, Ireland, many Commonwealth countries, Portugal, Brazil, Italy, Japan, and Peru; countries using the equivalent in the home language of "laboratory medicine" include Austria, Germany, Romania, Poland and other Eastern European countries; other terms are "clinical analysis" (Spain) and "clinical/medical biology (France, Belgium, Netherlands, North and West Africa).

== Licensing and subspecialities ==
The American Board of Pathology certifies clinical pathologists, and recognizes the following secondary specialties of clinical pathology:

- Chemical pathology, also called clinical chemistry
- Hematopathology
- Blood banking - Transfusion medicine
- Clinical microbiology
- Cytogenetics
- Molecular genetics pathology.

In some countries other sub specialities fall under certified Clinical Biologists responsibility:

- Reproductive biology including Assisted reproductive technology, Sperm bank and Semen analysis
- Immunopathology

== Organization ==
Clinical pathologists are often medical doctors. In some countries in South America, Europe, Africa or Asia, this specialty can be practiced by non-physicians, such as Ph.D. or Pharm.D. after a variable number of years of residency.

=== In the United States of America ===
Clinical pathologists work in close collaboration with clinical scientists (clinical biochemists, clinical microbiologists, etc.), medical technologists, hospital administrators, and referring physicians to ensure the accuracy and optimal utilization of laboratory testing.

Clinical pathology is one of the two major divisions of pathology, the other being anatomical pathology. Often, pathologists practice both anatomical and clinical pathology, a combination sometimes known as general pathology. Similar specialties exist in veterinary pathology.

Clinical pathology is itself divided into subspecialties, the main ones being clinical chemistry, clinical hematology/blood banking, hematopathology and clinical microbiology and emerging subspecialties such as molecular diagnostics and proteomics. Many areas of clinical pathology overlap with anatomic pathology. Both can serve as medical directors of CLIA certified laboratories. Under the CLIA law, only the US Department of Health and Human Services approved Board Certified Ph.D., DSc, or MD and DO can perform the duties of a Medical or Clinical Laboratory Director. This overlap includes immunoassays, flow cytometry, microbiology and cytogenetics and any assay done on tissue. Overlap between anatomic and clinical pathology is expanding to molecular diagnostics and proteomics as we move towards making the best use of new technologies for personalized medicine.

Clinical pathologists may assist physicians in interpreting complex tests such as platelet aggregometry, hemoglobin or serum protein electrophoresis, or coagulation profiles. If interfering substances are suspected, they may recommend alternate test methods. For example, hemolysis, icterus, lipemia, or heterophile antibodies may confound results obtained by traditional methods such as ion-selective electrodes, enzymatic assays or immunoassays. Alternate methods such as blood gas analysers, point-of-care testing or mass spectrometry may help resolve the clinical question.

=== In Europe ===
Recently, EFLM has chosen the name of "Specialists in Laboratory Medicine" to define all European Clinical pathologists, regardless of their training (M.D., Ph.D. or Pharm.D.).

In France, Clinical Pathology is called Medical Biology ("Biologie médicale") and is practiced by both M.D.s and Pharm.D.s. The residency lasts four years. Specialists in this discipline are called "Biologiste médical" which literally translates as Clinical Biologist rather than "Clinical pathologist".

== Tools ==
Tangible tools include microscopes, analyzers, strips, and centrifuges.

=== Macroscopic examination ===
Visual examination of the specimen may provide information to the pathologist or the physician. For example, fluid drained from an abscess may appear cloudy, or cerebrospinal fluid obtained by lumbar puncture may exhibit xanthochromia, suggesting a bleed has occurred. Laboratory technologists may provide qualitative descriptions accordingly.

=== Microscopical examination ===
Microscopic analysis is an important activity of the pathologist and the laboratory technologist. They have many different stains at their disposal (GRAM, MGG, Grocott, Ziehl–Neelsen, etc.). Immunofluorescence, cytochemistry, the immunocytochemistry, and FISH are also used in order make a correct diagnosis.

Pathologists may review samples such as pleural, peritoneal, synovial, or pericardial fluids to characterize them as "normal", tumoral, inflammatory, or even infectious. Microscopic examination can also determine the causal infectious agent – often a bacterium, mould, yeast, parasite, or (rarely) virus.

=== Laboratory Analysers ===
Automated analysers, by the association of robotics and spectrophotometry, have allowed these last decades better reproducibility of the results, in particular in medical biochemistry and hematology.

Efficiency and productivity can be enhanced by automating the pre-analytical processing, including barcode reading, sorting, centrifuging, and aliquoting specimens.

The analysers must undergo daily controls prior to performing patient testing. Analysers must also undergo daily, weekly and monthly maintenance. Quality management involves reviewing quality control trends to detect emerging problems in instrument calibration, correlating results between instruments that perform similar testing, and running standardized samples to prove linearity and precision.

Some laboratory processes involve automated analysis combined with manual review by technologists. For example, when hematology analysers flag samples as abnormal, automated white blood cell differential counts may be superseded by manual differential counts using stained slides read at the microscope or scanned by digital imaging software. Laboratory technologists may flag abnormal samples for pathologist review. The pathologist may recommend additional testing, such as flow cytometry to identify lymphoma or leukemia cells, or cytology to characterize solid tumor cells.

=== Cultures ===
Samples undergoing examination for pathogens, primarily in medical microbiology, may be incubated with culture media. Those allow, for example, the description of one or several infectious agents responsible of the clinical signs.

=== Values known as "normal" or reference values ===
A reference range in medicine is the range or the interval of values that is deemed normal for a physiological measurement in healthy persons (for example, the amount of creatinine in the blood, or the partial pressure of oxygen). It is a basis for comparison for a physician or other health professional to interpret a set of test results for a particular patient. Some important reference ranges in medicine are reference ranges for blood tests and reference ranges for urine tests.

== See also ==
- Pathology
- Medical laboratory
- Anatomic pathology
- Medical technologist
- Veterinary pathology
- Clinical Biologist
