= Ahmed Mira =

Kurdish journalist, writer, and academic

- ئەحمەد میرە
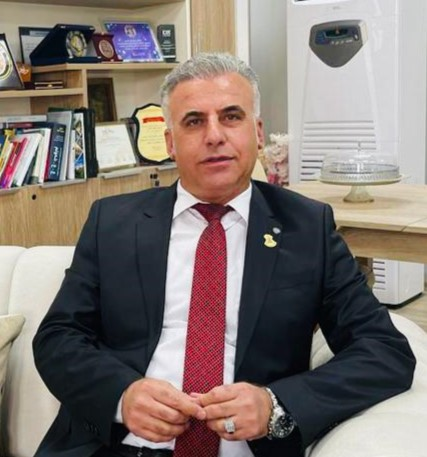

Founder and leader of the Lvin Magazine

Personal details
- Born: 1 July 1975 (age 51)
- Citizenship: Iraq

Ahmed Mira is an independent Kurdish journalist, writer, and academic based in the Kurdistan Region of Iraq. He is widely recognized for his prominent role in transitioning Kurdish journalism from traditional partisan media to an independent and free press. Mira is best known as the owner and editor-in-chief of Lvin magazine.

== Career and Lvin magazine ==
Mira founded Lvin magazine on November 2, 2002. Operating as a critical political publication, Lvin grew to become the most widespread and best-selling Independent Magazine in both the Kurdistan Region and across Iraq.

== Threats and imprisonment ==
Due to the magazine's investigative and critical reporting, Mira and his editorial team frequently faced death threats from the ruling political parties in the Kurdistan Region. This hostile environment ultimately led to the assassination of two of the magazine's journalists: Abd as-Sattar Sharif, on March 5, 2008, and Soran Mama Hama, on July 21, 2008.

Mira himself survived numerous death threats and was imprisoned dozens of times by political and security forces in the region. Most notably, he was held in solitary confinement on April 17, 2007, before eventually being released.

== Academic career and training ==
In addition to his journalistic endeavors, Mira holds a PhD. and serves as a professor at the University of Halabja.

Mira also completed advanced journalism programs with several international organizations, including IREX, IWPR, and MDI. Mira also works as a professional journalism trainer, both locally and internationally.

== Civil activism and international representation ==
Mira has been a leading figure in civil protests and public demonstrations in the Kurdistan Region, strongly advocating for human rights and freedom of expression.

In 2012, Mira, alongside Shwan Mohammed (editor-in-chief of Awene newspaper), was officially invited by the Swedish Parliament to visit Sweden as a representative of the independent Kurdish media.

== Publications ==
Mira had authors several books, focusing primarily on press freedom, cultural issues, and literature.
