= Agnes Borrowman =

Scottish pharmaceutical chemist

Agnes Borrowman (7 October 1881 – 20 August 1955) was a Scottish pharmaceutical chemist. In 1924 she became the first woman to serve on the Pharmaceutical Society's Board of Examiners.

== Early life and education ==
Agnes Thomson Borrowman was born on 7 October 1881, at Penicuik, Midlothian, Scotland to Margaret Davidson Borrowman and Peter Borrowman, a farm bailiff.

Her father secured her a four-year apprenticeship with pharmacist Mr D.F. Johnstone in Melrose, but as a woman she had to stay out of sight of customers "lest the prestige of the business should suffer." She found it hard to get a position after completing her apprenticeship, but found her first job with William Lyon at 7 Crichton Place, Leith Walk, Edinburgh, later claiming that the thorough training in practical pharmacy that she received made this the most formative year in her career. She was still not permitted to be seen at the front counter, but concentrated on compounding medicines, in a shop were no proprietaries were stocked. She used her half day holiday each week to study, attending the Edinburgh Central School of Pharmacy, Clyde Street, run by Mr W.B.Cowie. She passed the Pharmaceutical Society (PSGB) Minor exam in 1903 at York Place, the PSGB's North British Branch headquarters.

She then moved to England, first to Runcorn where she worked for three years managing a pharmacy for Mr J.H. Weston. While there she presented her first research paper 'Note on an Arsenic, Iron and Quinine Mixture' to the PSGB's North British Branch in Edinburgh on 17 February 1904. She also wrote to the Pharmaceutical Journal on 30 July 1904 noting gender differences in pay. Whilst at Runcorn, she contributed to the practice exercises for the PSGB Major exam published in the Pharmaceutical Journal, and also had a piece published on 'Cinchonidine and Cinchonine in a Sample of Quinine.'

Having subsequently spent three years working for Mr J Beetham Wilson in Dorking, she had saved enough to fulfil her ambition to take the higher PSGB Major exam. She studied at the PSGB School of Pharmacy in Bloomsbury Square, London and registered as a Pharmaceutical Chemist on 6 April 1909.

== Career ==
After registration, Borrowman was appointed research assistant to Professor Greenish at the School of Pharmacy. The School's Professor Crossley then recommended her for a role at the Rubber Growers' Association of Malaya and Ceylon. She worked on the synthesis of rubber, sheet and crepe rubbers, as imported from the Malay Peninsula and Ceylon, the examination of physical and chemical properties of vulcanised rubber, and of various processes of vulcanisation with a view to their improvement. Her research also covered soil analysis with the object of increasing the yield of latex, examination of distinctive fungi of the rubber plant, cellulose, paper-making, new processes for the production of artificial silk, and examination of possible plant paper-making materials. An article describing her career stated "Miss Borrowman acquired such a facility in the microscopic examination of fibres that she could tell at a glance the proportion or percentage of different fibres in a given paper." She also experimented with paper for detection of forgery. Drawing on her research, she gave a paper on rubber to the London Chemists' Assistants' Association and became the first woman to read a paper at an International Rubber Exhibition, when she presented on 'The Viscosity of Latex Hevea Braziliensis' at the Agricultural Hall, Islington in 1912. During this period, she also attended classes four evenings each week at Borough Poytechnic, Chelsea Polytechnic, and the Cass Institute. She devoted the other nights to reading and searching specifications at the Patent Office library. She also carried out practical work on the 1911 British Pharmaceutical Codex, and later contributed to its 1923 edition.

On her father's death in 1913, the need to contribute financially to support her family meant that she moved back to retail pharmacy, as her research role was poorly paid. She spent a year in Slough working for Mr Charles Sangster "to whom Miss Borrowman expresses special indebtedness for training in modern business knowledge and methods". In 1914, she became a joint director of the pharmacy at 17 The Pavement, Clapham with Margaret Buchanan, Sophia J Heywood and Margaret A MacDiarmid, all Pharmaceutical Chemists. As pioneering women pharmacists, they grasped the opportunity to support upcoming women pharmacy students by providing them with practical experience and positive role models in an era when both were in scant supply. One of their apprentices later reminisced "Surely no youngster could have had two more energetic or exacting tutors than the two "Miss B's" – Miss Buchanan and Miss Borrowman – at that time partners in the somewhat decaying business of Deane's of Clapham." Miss Borrowman wrote to the Pharmaceutical Journal on 10 December 1917 "During the last ten years women in pharmacy have proved by their college careers that they have enthusiasm, that they intend to take first place, that nothing less will satisfy them. Unless I am very much mistaken, the same enthusiasm and determination will carry them through in the business world into which this war [World War One] has given them the entry."

She became the sole proprietor of the business after the First World War. By 1923, of the 15 girls trained at 17 The Pavement who studied at the PSGB School of Pharmacy, 14 had taken prizes and scholarships. Under Borrowman's leadership, the business was staffed entirely by women. Based on her earlier experiences, virtually everything was made on the premises, and her staff wore her own design of distinctive shop dress with sage green cuffs and collar, in an attempt to overcome prejudice against women pharmacists by presenting a professional appearance.

During World War Two, she carried out fire-watching duties. In January 1945, a V2 bomb fell close to the pharmacy in Clapham, and badly damaged the building, probably with Borrowman inside in the air raid shelter that she had had constructed in the old cellars. Borrowman was "severely shaken" and rested away from London. She later reflected how "irksome" it was to stand back when her nerves failed her. In the same year, she converted the business into a limited company with Miss H.F. Wells and herself as directors. Miss Wells had served her apprenticeship with Miss Borrowman in 1918. The business was described in a 1954 article: "High pharmaceutical standards, judicious arrangement and sheer good housekeeping make the pharmacy a pattern to others, and keep it high in the traditions of its illustrious founder."

== Professional contributions ==
Miss Borrowman was associated with the (National) Association of Women Pharmacists from its foundation in 1905. She held numerous committee roles: for the South West Chemists' Association including as President (1929–31); for the South West PSGB Branch; as vice-president of her local branch of the Retail Pharmacists' Union; and as a member of the Pharmacy sub-committee of the British Pharmaceutical Codex Revision Committee (1934–37), the first woman to be appointed to this body. She was the first female member of the Pharmaceutical Society's Board of Examiners from 1924 until her resignation in 1937 when she felt that she wasn't able to keep up to date with current pharmaceutics. She surrendered her membership of the British Pharmaceutical Codex Revision Committee at the same time.

== Later life and death ==
Borrowman died on 20 August 1955 in a nursing home at 27 Lawrie Park Road, Sydenham, aged 73. That she left her effects to Sir Hugh Linstead, formerly PSGB Secretary and Registrar, and Jack Rowson, PSGB curator, shows her enduring links with the Society. Her funeral at South London Crematorium, Streatham Vale on 24 August 1955 was attended by Lady Jephcott, Sir Hugh and Lady Linstead, Dr Jack Rowson, Miss HF Wells and the staff of the pharmacy.

Borrowman was clearly a formidable and determined character, described in 1954 as having a "robust independence of outlook, accepting nothing that wilts under the probing beam of logic." In her obituary, it was stated that "Even in her last few weeks she remained a fighter, and during spells of consciousness would talk of people and things connected with her earlier days in the business for which she had lived and fought for forty years." An anonymous tribute to her concluded "she appeared to have an almost indestructible vitality. That she has not lived to any great age is in itself a commentary upon the lavish manner in which she dispersed that vitality."

In 2019 she was added to the Oxford Dictionary of National Biography.

== See also ==
- Medicinal chemistry
