= Louisa Stammwitz =

British pharmacist (1850–1916)

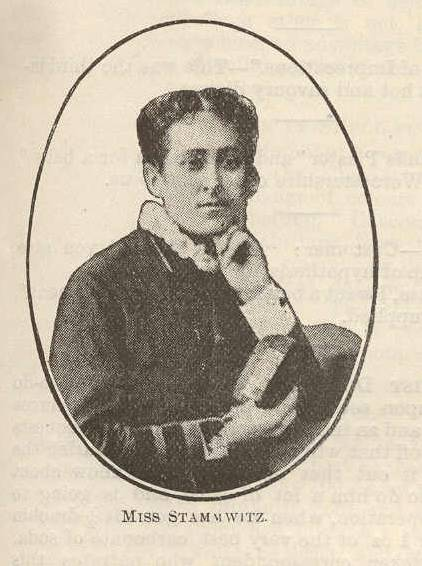
- Born: 1850
- Died: 1916 (aged 65–66)
- Education: South London School of Chemistry and Pharmacy
- Occupation: Pharmacist
- Known for: Campaigning for women's inclusion in Pharmaceutical Society of Great Britain

Louisa Stammwitz (1850 – 1916) was a British pharmacist whose campaigning contributed to the admission of women to the Pharmaceutical Society of Great Britain, along with the efforts of Rose Minshull, Alice Hart, and Isabella Clarke.

== Education ==
Despite expressing a preference to train as a doctor if that path had been available to women, Stammwitz studied at the South London School of Chemistry and Pharmacy, run by John Muter, who admitted women students. She also studied German and French at the Royal Polytechnic Institution in 1871.

== Pharmaceutical Society ==
After passing the Preliminary examination in pharmacy in 1873, Louisa Stammwitz and Rose Minshull worked as dispensers at a clinic run by Elizabeth Garrett Anderson. She and Minshull, along with Alice Hart, applied for membership of the Pharmaceutical Society. (Note: Dispensing chemist Elizabeth Leech had already applied for membership and been rejected in 1869, 1870, and 1872. Leech was elected a member in 1880.) When their applications were rejected, they objected, laying out their case in letters to the Pharmaceutical Journal. Stammwitz and Minshull applied again, and were rejected again, in 1877 when they had passed the Minor examination and registered as chemists and druggists.

The Pharmacy Act 1868 did not bar women from becoming pharmacists, so the Pharmaceutical Society began allowing women to attend its lectures that year. However, women were still not allowed to use its laboratory facilities. Hart, Minshull and Stammwitz petitioned for access in 1872, but this was not granted until 1877, when Minshull and Stammwitz had passed the Minor exam.

The next year, Stammwitz and Minshull passed the Major examination and registered as pharmaceutical chemists. Stammwitz came second out of a class of eight, of whom four failed the exam, and she was received with a rendition of 'See, the Conquering Hero Comes' by her fellow students when she was given her certificate. Minshull applied for Society membership again, this time with Isabella Clarke. The women's candidacy was rejected again at the 1879 Annual Meeting in May by three votes, but in October that year, the council voted to admit them. Clarke and Minshull were admitted that year, and Stammwitz the next year.

== Career and later life ==
Stammwitz held a post as a dispenser at the New Hospital for Women in London for nine years. She then opened a pharmacy in Paignton, Devon with Annie Neve, a former apprentice of Isabella Clarke who had qualified as a pharmacist in 1884. Stammwitz said that 'At first there was some prejudice against us as women chemists, but that almost disappeared after a few months.' She displayed her certificates on the wall, finding that, at first, she often had to explain that she was a qualified chemist. She and Annie dissolved the partnership in 1891 due to ill health and retired to Sanderstead, Croydon together. Louisa died in 1916.
