= Jean Irvine =

Pharmacist

- Born: 22 July 1876; Hawick
- Died: 1962
- Occupation: Pharmacist

Jean Kennedy Irvine (22 July 1876 – 3 March 1962) was a pharmacist from Hawick, Scotland and the first woman president of the Royal Pharmaceutical Society of Great Britain.

== Early life and education ==
Jane Kennedy, known from an early age as Jean, was born on 22 July 1876 in Hawick, Scotland to Jane Kennedy (née Law) and Walter Phillips Kennedy, a bookseller. She served an apprenticeship in her home town with the pharmacist Thomas Maben, and qualified in 1900.

== Career ==
After registering as a Pharmaceutical Chemist with the Pharmaceutical Society, she became assistant pharmacist, then chief pharmacist to the Glasgow Apothecaries Company. She worked for well-known Glasgow pharmacist John McMillan, and then joined the staff of the Glasgow Royal Infirmary. After her marriage to fellow Pharmaceutical Chemist Peter Irvine (1876-1949) on 2 June 1904, she assisted him in running the two pharmacies he owned within Glasgow.

When her husband was recruited to the army on the outbreak of the First World War, Irvine moved to London so she could be closer to him. She took a job in 1914 checking the pricing of National Health Insurance prescriptions, and then in 1916 after centralised pricing bureaux were established, she became the superintendent of the Joint Committee for Pricing Prescriptions (South-Eastern Division), which was responsible for overseeing the pricing of prescriptions in the region and held this position for 35 years until her retirement in 1947.

In 1928, she was made a Member of the Order of the British Empire (MBE) for "meritorious service in connection with the National Insurance Scheme." She served as the first woman president of the staff side of the Whitley Council for National Health Insurance administrative, technical and clerical services. In 1932, Irvine was elected as the president of the Insurance Committee Officers Association for England and Wales, the first female president for the organization.

Irvine became president of the National Association of Women Pharmacists and also served as its honorary secretary. She was sponsored by the Association to stand for election to the Royal Pharmaceutical Society Council in 1937, becoming only the third woman Council member in its history. In June 1947, she became its first woman president. In her acceptance speech, she referred to Hildegard of Bingen's Physica (1533) held in the Society's Library, and said that anyone who doubted the place of women in pharmacy history should read it. During her year's term as president, she oversaw the Society's final agreement with the University of London on the transfer of the new building in Brunswick Square which would house its school of pharmacy (now UCL School of Pharmacy). She remained on the council until 1952.

== Death and legacy ==
In 1957 Irvine's portrait was painted by Norman Hepple and exhibited at the Royal Academy’s summer exhibition. It later hung in the council chamber at the Pharmaceutical Society headquarters in Bloomsbury Square, and still forms part of the Royal Pharmaceutical Society’s collections.

She died aged 85 on 3 March 1962 at 166 Westbourne Grove, Paddington, London. A requiem mass was held for her on 8 March 1962 at the Church of the Most Holy Redeemer, Cheyne Row, London, followed by a private interment.

The tributes published in the Pharmaceutical Journal following her death recognised that her achievements were made possible by her strength of character: "Mrs Irvine was forthright in her opinions, which she combined with granitic honesty of a Scot educated in the Victorian era; a virtue perhaps not always appreciated by those who live in the gentler south," but she was recognised as "a major force in the organisation which set out to secure for women equal opportunities with men."

In 2019 she was added to the Oxford Dictionary of National Biography.
