= Elsie Higgon =

British pharmacist, researcher and lecturer (1879–1969)

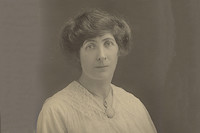
- Higgon c. 1920
- Born: Elsie Seville Hooper; 5 September 1879; 174 Amhurst Road, West Hackney, London, UKGBI
- Died: 6 May 1969 (aged 89); Paignton, Devon, UK
- Education: University of London, 1899; School of Pharmacy
- Occupations: Pharmacist; researcher; lecturer
- Spouse: William Higgon (m. 1920; died 1966)

Elsie Seville Higgon (née Hooper; 5 September 1879 – 6 May 1969) was a British pharmacist, researcher, lecturer and Suffragette. Higgon was the first Joint Secretary of the (National) Association of Women Pharmacists; researcher for King's College, the British Medical Journal and the British Pharmaceutical Codex; Lecturer in Chemistry at Portsmouth Municipal College; proprietor pharmacist of two businesses in Hampstead and proprietor of the Gordon Hall School of Pharmacy for Women in Gordon Square.

== Early life and education ==
Higgon was born Elsie Seville Hooper on 5 September 1879 at 174 Amhurst Road in West Hackney, London to Cleeve Hooper (1842–1910), a leather factor, and Elizabeth Hooper (née Mack; 1843–1921). One of six siblings, Higgon was educated at Miss Pearce’s girls’ school and North London Collegiate School.

Graduating from the University of London in January 1899, Higgon enrolled at the Pharmaceutical Society of Great Britain (PSGB) School of Pharmacy. Passing the PSGB Minor examination, Higgon was registered as a chemist and druggist on 10 July 1901. Higgon later passed the Major examination and was registered as a pharmaceutical chemist on 16 April 1902.

== Career ==
Hooper was awarded the Redwood Research Scholarship in 1902, the first woman to achieve this since its foundation in 1888. She was awarded a Burroughs Scholarship by the Pharmaceutical Society in 1903, also the first woman to do so. She undertook her research with Professor Greenish, including a joint paper in 1904 on "The So-called Beilschmeide Bark" (later published in the Pharmaceutical Journal in 1907). Having made a detailed anatomical study of the bark, she established that it was not a Laurearceous bark. She had a number of other notes and papers published in the Pharmaceutical Journal: with Greenish on "Constituents of Simarouba Bark" in 1902, on "Exhaustion of Belladonna Root with Alcohol" in July 1904, and on "Liquid Extract of Cinchona" in October 1904.

Meanwhile while carrying out research and working as a Demonstrator at the PSGB School, she studied for a degree in botany and chemistry in the evenings at Birkbeck College, which she gained in 1905. She then worked on the first British Pharmaceutical Codex (1907), and studied for her Institute of Chemistry qualification, which she passed in 1906. She became a Fellow of the Institute of Chemistry in 1909.

After a year's analytical work for Professor Huntington at King's College, she worked with Mr E.F. Harrison on Secret Remedies (1909), a publication produced by the British Medical Journal to expose the previously unknown formulae of popular medicines. After a year, she left to take up a chemical lectureship at Portsmouth Municipal College, which she held for four and a half years, setting up and leading the pharmacy course. During World War One, she worked as an analyst in charge of the laboratory at Ucal in Cheltenham.

From 1920, she remained London-based for the rest of her working life. During 1921 her registered address changed to Gordon Hall School of Pharmacy, Gordon Square, London, where she had trained under Margaret Buchanan. She worked at the school between 1920 and 1942, first as a lecturer and then as joint proprietor with Katherine King from 1921. In 1923, she presented a paper with her colleague Katherine King at the British Pharmaceutical Conference on "International Standardisation of Colchicum Preparations". Hooper also owned two pharmacies, where she was keen to apprentice female pharmacy students from the school: from 1924 until 1945 at 12a Belsize Terrace, London NW3 and at 1 Flask Walk, Hampstead, London NW3 until 1961.

== Activism ==
Hooper was the first Joint Secretary of the Association of Women Pharmacists on its foundation in 1905, a post she shared with Georgina Barltrop. She served as the Association's Vice President in 1926, and its President in 1928.

A short report in The Chemist and Druggist on 24 June 1911 informs the reader that Elsie Hooper B.Sc.has taken part in the Science Section of a march to call for women's suffrage. Although she is not pictured in the piece which focusses on the small women pharmacists' section, she was one of 40,000 women who marched from Victoria Embankment to the Royal Albert Hall on Saturday 17 June 1911.

== Personal life ==
On 31 July 1920, aged 40, she married William John Higgon (1886–1966) at Hendon Register Office. The marriage certificate records her profession as analytical chemist whilst her new husband was an aeronautical engineer, having previously served with the Royal Air Force. In 1939 they were recorded as living at 43 Belsize Avenue, London where William Higgon was listed as of independent means and Elsie Higgon as a chemist and ARP warden. There were another 17 people living at the address including Elsie Higgon's colleague Katherine King.

Elsie Higgon died on 6 May 1969 in Mount Olivet Nursing Home, 2 Great Headland Road, Paignton. The causes of death are given as heart failure, hypertension, and carcinoma of pancreas. Her obituary stated that "I am sure she would wish to say what a happy time she had in pharmacy."

In 2019 she was added to the Oxford Dictionary of National Biography.
