= Katherine M King =

English pharmacist (1881–1979)

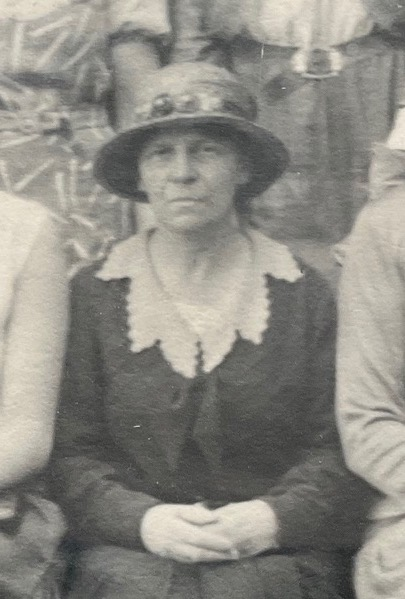
- King in 1932
- Born: Katherine Mary King; 29 December 1881; Richmond, Yorkshire, UKGBI
- Died: January 1979 (aged 97); Droxford, Hampshire, UK
- Occupation: Pharmacist
- Medical career
- Institutions: Stanley Hospital Liverpool; Leicester Royal Infirmary; Gordon Hall School of Pharmacy for Women

Katherine Mary King PhC (29 December 1881 – January 1979) was a British pharmacist and joint proprietor of the Gordon Hall School of Pharmacy for Women in Gordon Square.

== Early life and education ==
King was born Katherine Mary King on 29 December 1881 in Richmond, Yorkshire to Robert Henry King, a land agent, and Florence King.

Passing the Pharmaceutical Society minor examination, King was registered as a chemist and druggist on 13 July 1903. King later passed the Pharmaceutical Society major examination and was registered as a pharmaceutical chemist on 7 April 1920.

== Career ==
She gave a paper at a “very animated and interesting meeting” of the Association of Woman Pharmacists (AWP) on 6 November 1917. Titled ‘Suggestions for Rendering the Association of Women Pharmacists of More Benefit to County Members’, her main point was to encourage much more movement between pharmacists in London and the regions. It was advice that she took herself: having seemingly been based in Hull around 1913, when she is mentioned in The Chemist and Druggist on 27 December giving a report of the conference of women workers held in Hull to the AWP meeting at Gordon Hall: “Miss King gave short abstracts of the papers read, and commented on them and the discussions in a humorous manner.” In 1915, Miss King is listed in the audience at the meeting of the Chemists’ Association in Royal Institution Liverpool. She was working at the Stanley Hospital Liverpool in 1917, a hospital for treatment of diseases of the chest and diseases of women and children that operated from 1867 to 1936. In the announcement of her joint proprietorship of the Gordon Hall School, in November 1921, she is described as “late of Leicester Royal Infirmary.”

From 1921, she remained London-based for the rest of her working life. In 1921 her address in the Pharmaceutical Society register changed to Gordon Hall School of Pharmacy, Gordon Square, London. She worked at the school between 1920 and 1942, as joint principal with Elsie Hooper from 1921. In 1923, she presented a paper with Miss Hooper at the British Pharmaceutical Conference on ‘International Standardisation of Colchicum Preparations’. In the 1939 Register, carried out nationally to record the civilian population on 29 September 1939, both Elsie Hooper and Katherine King are to be found at 43 Belsize Avenue, London. The household's head is William Higgon, (“independent”, aged 53) and his wife is Elsie Seville Higgon - Elsie Hooper. Katherine King is aged 58 and described as “Pharmaceutical Chemist and ARP [Air Raid Patrol] Hampstead.”

She last appears in the Pharmaceutical Society register in 1964.

== Activism ==
Once she was based in London, she seems to have played a committed role at Association of Women Pharmacist events, mentioned in reports throughout the 1920s. She is named as present at a joint meeting of the AWP and Guild of Public Pharmacists on November 17, 1927; as taking part in an AWP ramble from Epsom station, on June 3, 1928; and as taking part in a discussion at an AWP social evening at the Plane Tree Restaurant, Great Russell Street on 20 February 1929. She also attended local Pharmaceutical Society branch meetings: for example, she was one of the people asking questions at lecture on the principles of antiseptics for the North East London Branch in January 1923.

== Personal life ==
In January 1979, King died in Droxford, Hampshire aged 97.

== Other sources ==
- Pharmaceutical Society Registers
