= Elsie Wardle =

British pharmacist (1884 – 1922)

Elsie Wardle (1884 – 1922) was a British pharmacist and President of the National Association of Women Pharmacists.

== Life ==
She was born in 1884 in Oldham and attended Hulme Grammar School, where she was later active in the Old Girls' Association.

She trained at the University of London School of Pharmacy under Margaret Buchanan, qualifying as a pharmacist in 1905. She then became chief pharmacist at Queen's Hospital in London. Returning to Oldham in 1915, she became pharmacist at the Royal Infirmary. In 1913, she and Buchanan, along with Nora Renouf, were the first women admitted to the annual dinner of the School of Pharmacy. She held several roles in the Women Pharmacists' Association, where she became President in 1921.

Wardle also held several voluntary positions in the fields of local church, education, and Girl Guides.

She died in August 1922.
