= Elizabeth Leech =

English pharmacist (d. 1886)

Elizabeth Leech (d. 1886) was an English pharmacist known for her struggle to be admitted to the Pharmaceutical Society of Great Britain.

== Life ==
Her father, Thomas Leech, ran a chemist's shop in Rochdale, Lancashire. She worked there with him for seven years, and then with her brother for six years, and finally on her own for nine years. With the economic downturn of the Lancashire cotton famine in the early 1860s, she had to close her shop, and became compounder and dispenser of prescriptions at the Munster House Lunatic Asylum in Fulham. Over the next two decades, she worked as a chemist and druggist in Worthing and London.

In 1869, Leech became the first woman to apply for membership of the Pharmaceutical Society, partly in support of her efforts to reopen a shop. She had passed the modified exam introduced by the Pharmacy Act (1868). Her application was supported by Robert Hampson, but was rejected. Two of her further applications were rejected in 1870 and 1872. She objected that she had not been given 'a just reason' for her rejection and that the Society had acted contrary to the Pharmacy Act, which did not specify sex disqualification.

The first women (Rose Coombes Minshull and Isabella Skinner Clarke) were admitted to the Pharmaceutical Society in 1879, and Leech was finally elected a member in 1880.

She died in September 1886 in Wandsworth.
