= Ella Corfield =

British pharmacist

Ella Corfield (née Caird) (17 Jan 1894–11 Aug 1986) was a British pharmacist, achieving pioneering academic work in her early career and later business management. She also held senior ranks in the British Red Cross.

== Early life and education ==
Ella Caird was born on 17 January 1894, the younger daughter of the Reverend David Caird, Lyndhurst, Regent's Park Road, Church End, London. She served a three-year apprenticeship at the Gordon Hall School of Pharmacy from 1911, before becoming a student at the Pharmaceutical Society of Great Britain (PSGB) School of Pharmacy in Bloomsbury Square, London. She passed the PSGB Minor examination, registering as a Chemist & Druggist in 1914. She gained bronze medals in botany and chemistry, the Martindale medal in pharmacy, and the CJ Hewlett memorial exhibition, with the highest honours of any student in the course that year.

She passed the PSGB Major examination and registered as a Pharmaceutical Chemist in 1915. She won an unprecedented clean sweep in that year's student medals with silver medals in botany, chemistry, practical chemistry and materia medica. She was awarded the highest student award of the Pereira Medal, and gained a Redwood research scholarship. She went on to study successfully for a BSc (Hons) in Chemistry at the University of London. She passed the intermediate exam of the (now Royal) Institute of Chemistry in July 1917, and was awarded associateship of the Institute in July 1918.

== Career ==
Caird worked first as a demonstrator, then senior demonstrator and then assistant lecturer in chemistry and physics at the Pharmaceutical Society's school, as well as serving as the assistant to the examiners, all extremely rare positions for a woman to hold. She is described as resigning these positions in 1921 to "become actively associated" with her husband, Charles Corfield's work in the analytical chemistry business Harrison and Self on Chancery Lane, and his editorship of the British Pharmaceutical Codex and the Extra Pharmacopoeia. Having gone into partnership with Mr Self in 1925, Charles Corfield's subsequent ill-health led to his wife getting heavily involved in the business. She was made a partner, alongside Mrs E. W. Kassner in 1942, particularly tasked with building up the laboratories which had been completely destroyed in 1940. She continued in the role after her husband's sudden death in 1945, spending 13 years as business principal, retiring in 1956.

After her retirement, she continued to work part-time in a hospital pharmacy role.

== Voluntary positions and community roles ==
She was elected a member of the executive committee for the British Pharmaceutical Conference at a meeting on 14 October 1919.

She served as president of the Pharmaceutical Society's School of Pharmacy Past Students’ Association in 1930, the first woman to take that role.

She was secretary and convener of the Ladies’ Committee for the British Pharmaceutical Conference, held in London in 1933.

During the Second World War, Ella was active in work for the Red Cross and Civil Defense. She raised two detachments in her local area of Barnet, and qualified as an instructor in first aid, home nursing, anti-gas measures and artificial respiration. Having first held the rank of Commandant, she became the British Red Cross Society's Assistant County director for Hertfordshire until 1942, and was later appointed an honorary Commandant.

She was elected a Fellow of the Royal Institute of Chemistry in 1942.

== Personal life ==
On 30 March 1921, she married Charles Edwin "Flick" Corfield at Church End Congregational Church, Finchley, London. She initially helped her husband with editorial work for the British Pharmaceutical Codex.

She was still described as "still enjoying life" in 1982. Corfield died on 11 August 1986 in Church Stretton, Shropshire.
