= Nora Renouf =

British pharmaceutical chemist (b. 1881 d. 1959)

Nora Renouf (b. 1881 d. 1959) was a British pharmaceutical chemist who was a pioneer for women’s involvement in the profession.

== Early life and education ==
She was born in Jersey to John Renouf and his wife Delahay Woods. After working in a chemist’s shop on her home island, she studied at the School of Pharmacy at the University of London. She passed the Major examination and received a certificate of honour in practical chemistry in 1903. She and Elsie Wardle were to become the first women to attend the School’s annual dinner in 1913.

== Scientific career ==
Renouf received the Redwood Research Scholarship in 1904 and worked in the Research Laboratory of the Pharmaceutical Society. In 1905–7 she worked as a Salters Research Fellow, the first woman and the first pharmacist to receive the Fellowship in Chemistry from the Salters' Company. During this time she made several investigations with Arthur William Crossley, and together they 'cleared up several questions from the earlier literature on chemical constitution.'

She was a founding member of the Association of Women Pharmacists, where she served as treasurer from 1907 – 1916.

In 1909, she was one of the signatories of a letter to Chemical News requesting that women be admitted as Fellows of the Chemical Society. She became one of the first cohort of women fellows there in 1920.

== Later life ==
During World War I, she worked in a hospital in the Channel Islands. She worked as a surveyor for the Fuel Research Board of the Department of Scientific and Industrial Research, where she was appointed Secretary in 1922.

She died in 1959.
