= Order of Pharmacists of Lebanon =

Lebanese pharmaceutical organisation

The Order of Pharmacists of Lebanon is a pharmaceutical organisation based in Beirut.

It formed a partnership with the Royal Pharmaceutical Society in February 2018. More than 1,800 pharmacists attended its 24th Annual Congress in 2016.

It was supported by Michel Aoun the President of Lebanon.
