= Women's Coronation Procession =

British suffragette march on 17 June 1911

- Part of first-wave feminism
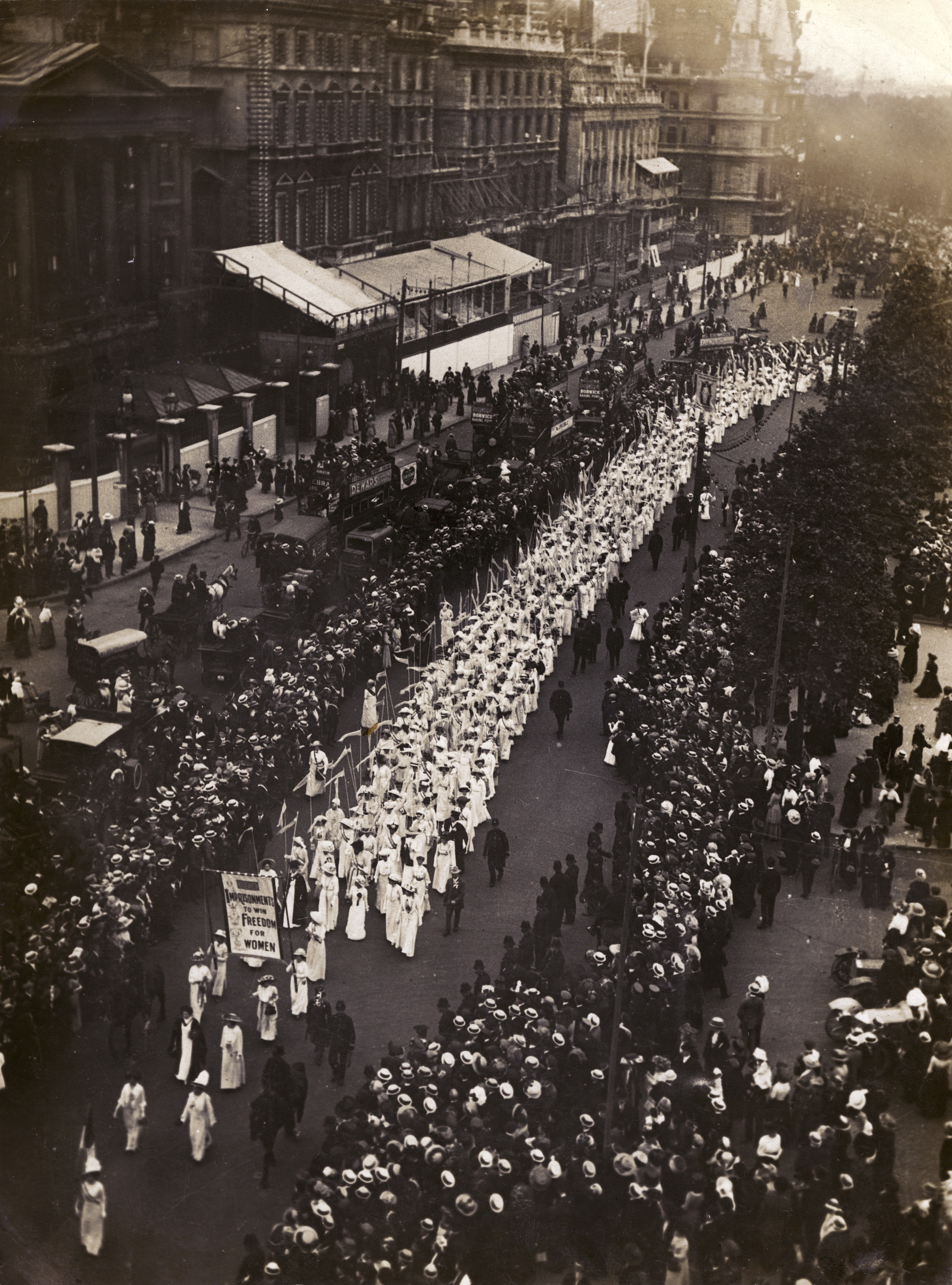
- The 'Prison to Citizenship' pageant
- Date: 17 June 1911
- Location: Westminster, London, England. Marchers converged on the Albert Hall, South Kensington. 51°30′03.40″N 00°10′38.77″W
- Caused by: Fight for women's suffrage
- Methods: Demonstrations, marches

Parties
Women's Social and Political Union (WSPU)	Liberal government, 1905–1915

Lead figures
Emmeline Pankhurst (WSPU)	Prime Minister H. H. Asquith

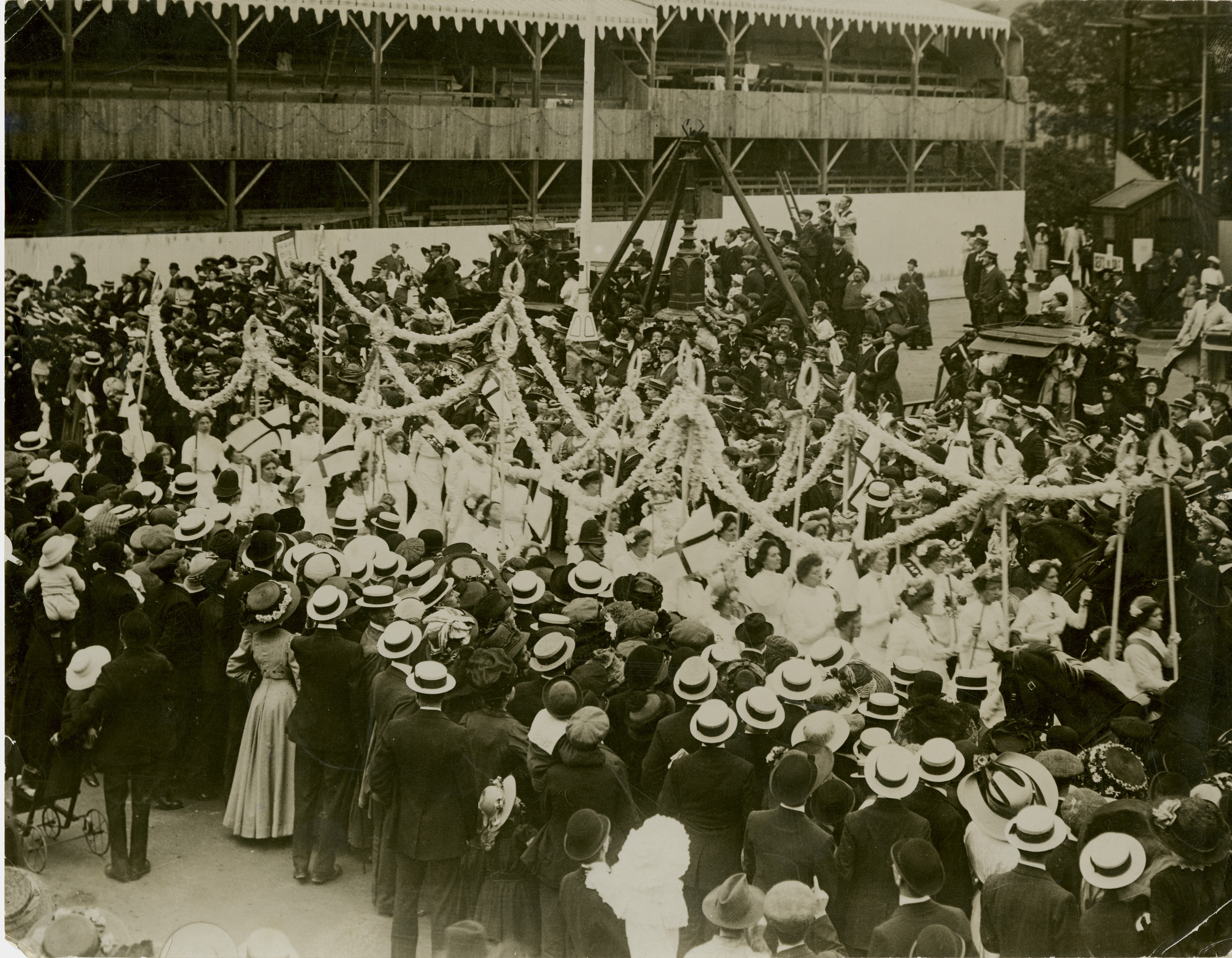
Marches dressed in white during the procession

The Women's Coronation Procession was a suffragette march through London, England, on 17 June 1911, just before the Coronation of George V and Mary, demanding women's suffrage in the coronation year. It aimed to draw the attention of both the public and the new king to the campaign for votes for women and show the strength of the movement before an upcoming Conciliation Bill debate in Parliament.

== Background ==
The march was organised by the Women's Social and Political Union (WSPU), led by Emmeline Pankhurst. It was "the largest women’s suffrage march ever held in Britain and one of the few to draw together the full range of suffrage organisations." At least 28 women's suffrage focused organisations attended the march and marchers came from across the British Isles and territories of the British Empire (including Australia, India, New Zealand and South Africa).

== The procession ==
Some 40,000 people marched from Westminster to the Albert Hall in South Kensington. Charlotte Despard and Flora Drummond on horseback led the march, which included Marjery Bryce dressed as Joan of Arc and 700 women and girls clothed in white to represent suffragette prisoners. Kate Harvey, Edith Downing and Marion Wallace-Dunlop were among the organisers, and Lolita Roy is believed to have been as well. Jane Cobden organised the Indian women's delegation.

== Participants ==
Marchers represented occupational organisations including the Actresses Franchise League (AFL). Elsie Hooper and other members of the National Association of Women Pharmacists joined the march. In June 1911 the Chemist and Druggist carried photographs of women pharmacists in the march and reported "Miss Elsie Hooper, B.Sc., was in the Science Section, and several other women pharmacists did the two-and-a-half hours’ march.”

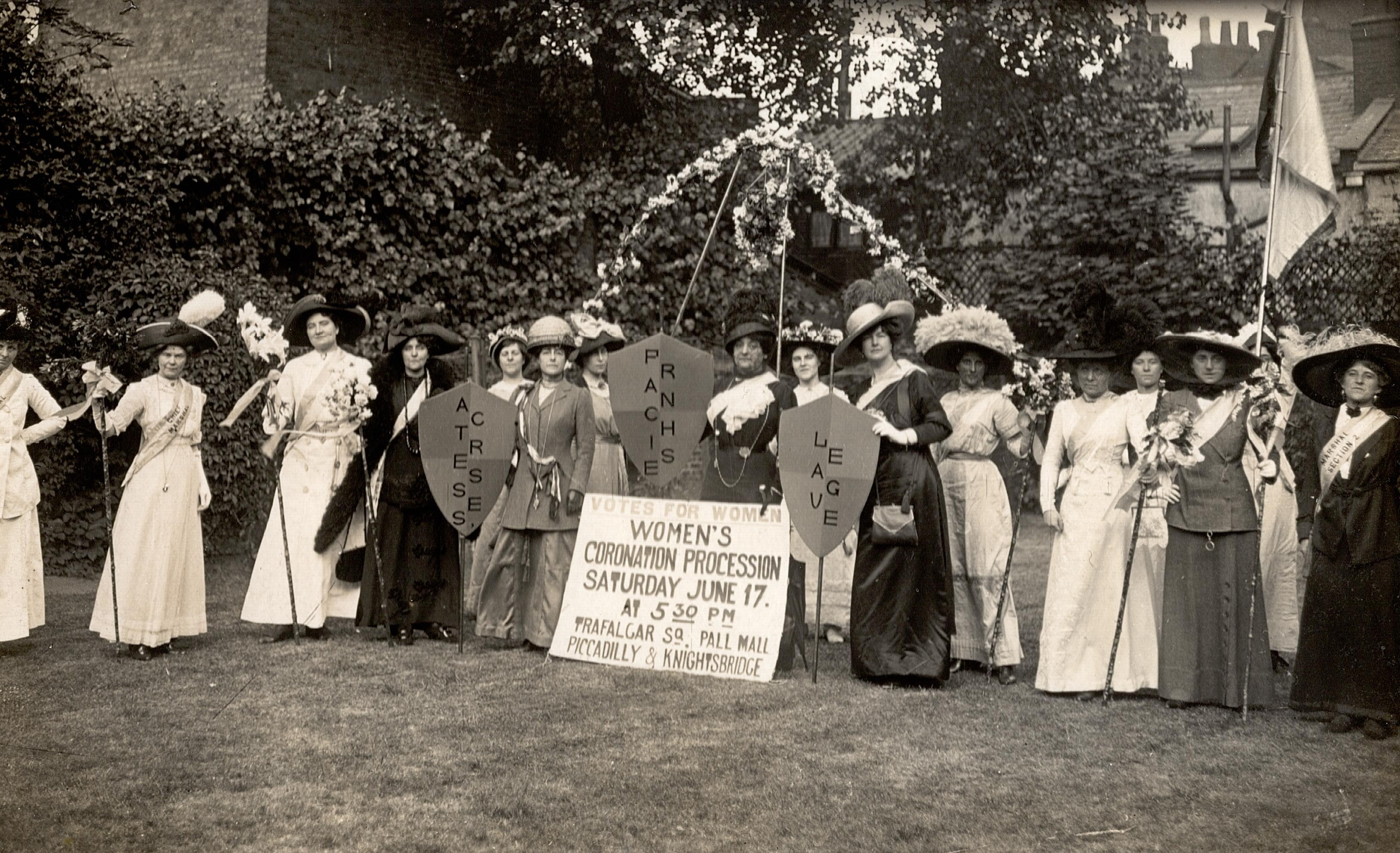
Members of the Actresses' Franchise League (AFL) with a banner and shields for the procession

The presence of a substantial number of marchers, both clergymen and lay women, under the banner of the Church League for Women's Suffrage was remarked upon by the Church Times. There was also a contingency of male and female theosophists, marching under the banner of Universal Co-Freemasonry in full Masonic regalia, led by Annie Besant.

Male campaigners for women's votes, including members of the Men's League for Women's Suffrage, supported the march.

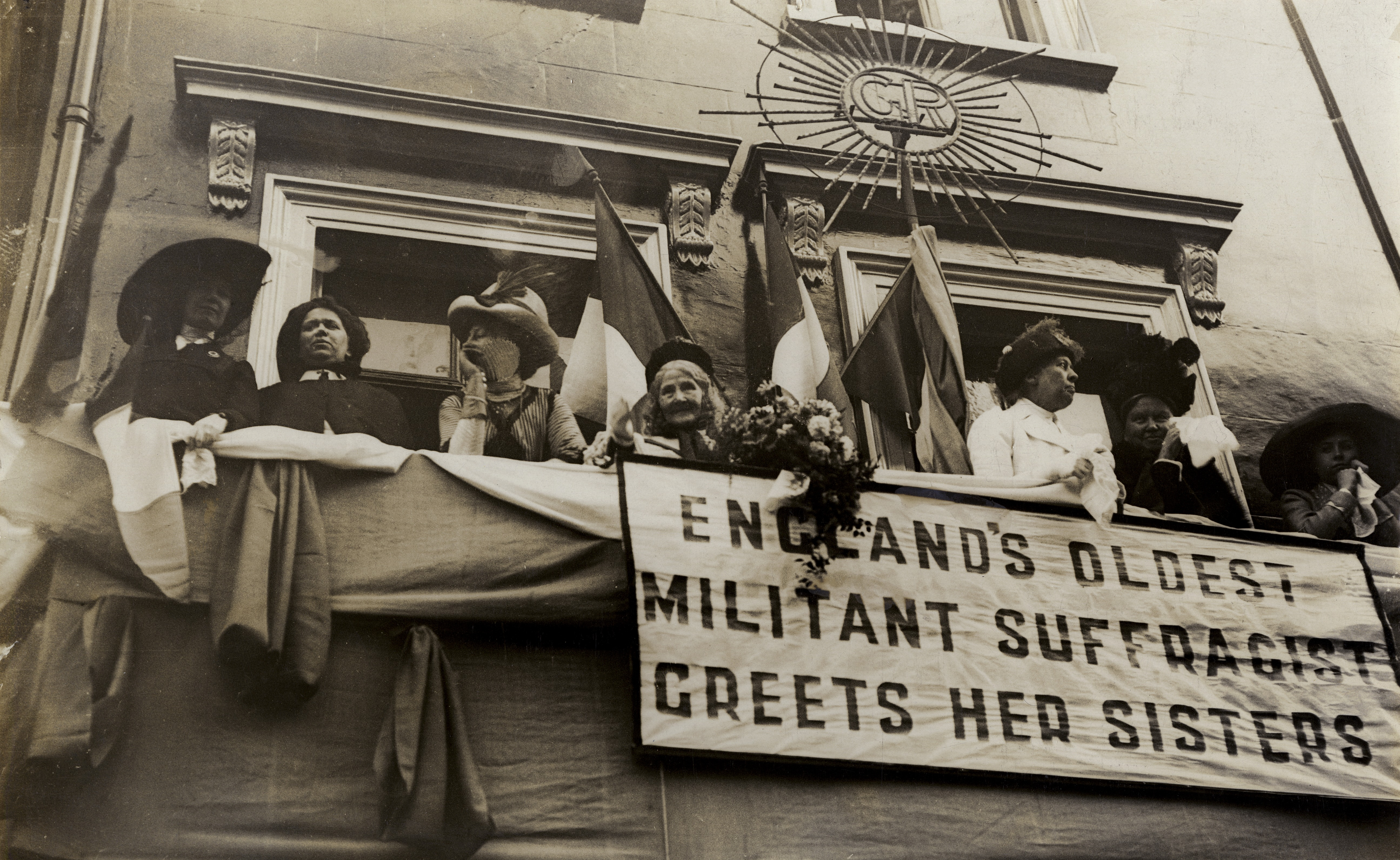
Elizabeth Wolstenholme Elmy watches the procession from a balcony

== See also ==
- Mud March, 1907 suffrage procession in London
- Women's Sunday, 1908 suffrage march and rally in London
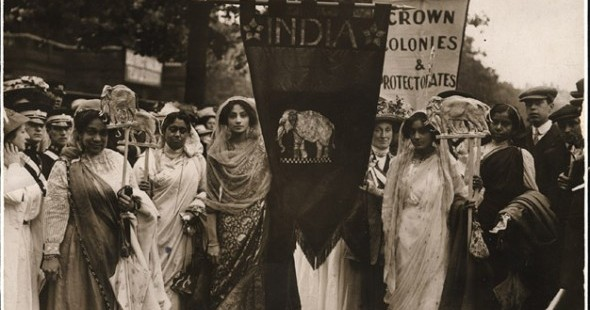
- Indian suffragists including Bhagwati Bhola Nauth and Lolita Roy
  Great Pilgrimage, 1913 suffrage march in the UK
- List of British suffragists and suffragettes
