= Elsie Woodward Kassner =

British pharmacist (1896 – 1959)

Elsie Kassner (née Woodward, 1896 – 1959) was a British pharmacist who co-ran a pharmaceutical analysis company with Ella Corfield.

== Early life and education ==
Born Elsie Woodward in April 1896, she was educated at Montagu House School, Weymouth. In 1917 she was a Bell Scholar at the London School of Pharmacy, also studying at Birkbeck College, London from 1919 – 1921.

She passed the Minor examination to qualify as a pharmacist in 1918, and the Major in 1919, gaining the Bronze medal of the Royal Pharmaceutical Society. She was later to become a Fellow of the Pharmaceutical Society.

== Pharmaceutical and business career ==
Woodward became a Demonstrator in Chemistry at the School of Pharmacy in 1919, and made publications with C.E. Corfield, Ella Corfield's husband.

In 1925, she married an American pharmacist, Mr Kassner, and moved to the United States, where he had a post at the Albany School of Pharmacy. She continued to publish and edited a new edition of the American Pharmaceutical Association's Pharmaceutical Recipe Book after her husband’s death in 1934.

In 1938, Kassner resumed her appointment at the London School of Pharmacy. She and the Corfields took charge of a drug distribution company, Harrison & Self. Ella Corfield and Kassner were made partners in the company in 1945, running it together after the death of Ella's husband in 1945. They were responsible for the rebuilding of the company's laboratories when they were destroyed in World War II.

Corfield and Kassner retired in the 1950s, and Kassner died in September 1959.
