= Charlotte Despard =

Anglo-Irish suffragist (1844–1939)

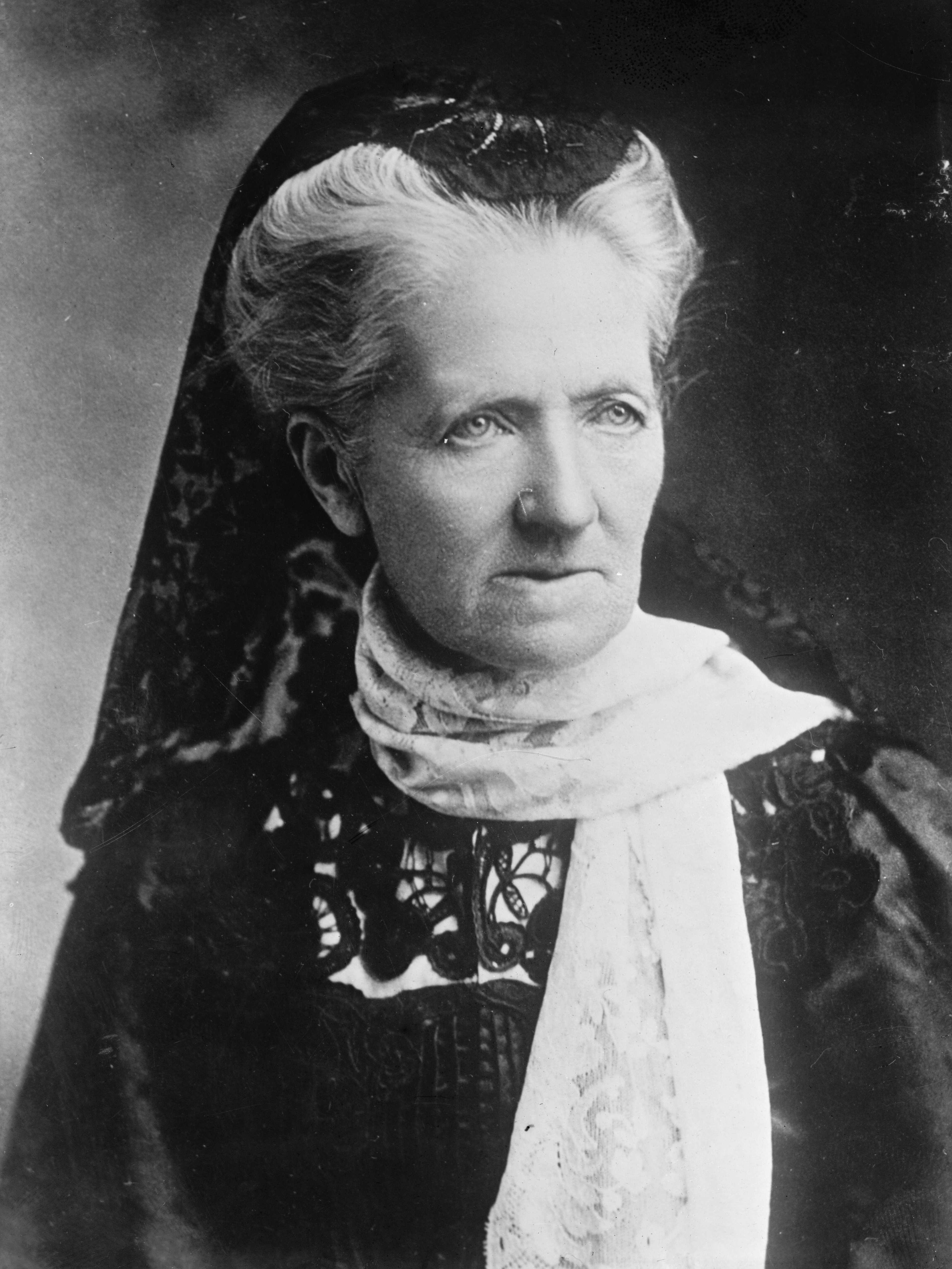
- Despard, c. 1910
- Born: Charlotte French; 15 June 1844; Edinburgh, Scotland
- Died: 10 November 1939 (aged 95); Whitehead, Northern Ireland
- Known for: Activism in the suffragist, pacifist, Irish republican, and socialist movements; novels
- Political party: Communist Party of Great Britain (CPGB)
- Spouse: Maximilian Carden Despard (m. 1870; died 1890)
- Relatives: John French, 1st Earl of Ypres (brother); Katherine Harley (sister)

Charlotte Despard (née French; 15 June 1844 – 10 November 1939) was an Anglo-Irish suffragist, socialist, pacifist, Sinn Féin activist, and novelist. She was a founding member of the Women's Freedom League, the Women's Peace Crusade, and the Irish Women's Franchise League, and an activist in a wide range of political organizations over the course of her life, including among others the Women's Social and Political Union, Humanitarian League, Labour Party, Cumann na mBan, and the Communist Party of Great Britain.

Despard was imprisoned four times for her suffragette activism, and she continued campaigning for women's rights, poverty relief and world peace into her 90s.

== Early life ==
Charlotte French was born on 15 June 1844 in Edinburgh and lived as a child in Edinburgh and Campbeltown in Scotland and from around 1850 in England at Ripple, Kent, her father was Irish Captain John Tracy William French of the Royal Navy (who died in 1855) and her mother Margaret French, née Eccles (died suffering from insanity in 1865). She was educated by a series of governesses and intermittently at private school, but complained in later life that her schooling was 'slipshod' and 'inferior'. Despard was always dubious of authority and ran away from home at the age of 10, getting a train to London "to become a servant". After her father died, the family settled in Edinburgh and later York. Despard's brother Sir John French became both a leading military commander during World War I and Lord Lieutenant of Ireland, putting them on opposing political sides in later life. She had five sisters; one, Katherine Harley, also a suffragist, served in the Scottish Women's Hospital during World War I in France.

Despard regretted her lack of education, although she did attend a finishing school in London. With two of her sisters, she travelled in Germany and Paris (there in 1870 at the start of the Franco-Prussian War). The same year, she married businessman Maximilian Carden Despard, and travelled with him across his business interests in Asia, including India. He died at sea in 1890; they had no children. Despard wore black for most of the rest of her days.

Despard was a Freemason as a member of Universal Co-Freemasonry, acting as Assistant Deacon in the Co-Masonic procession of September 1911.

== Novels ==
Despard's first novel, Chaste as Ice, Pure as Snow was published in 1874. Over the next sixteen years, she wrote ten novels, three of which were never published. Outlawed: a Novel on the Women's Suffrage Question was written with her friend, Mabel Collins and published in 1908.

== Charity ==
Following her husband's death when she was 46, Despard was encouraged by friends to take up charitable work. She was shocked and radicalised by the levels of poverty in London and devoted her time and money to helping poor people in Battersea, including a health clinic, soup kitchen for the unemployed, and youth and working men's clubs in this slum area. Vere Hinton, the ward of Despard, and a Mrs M Wells, née Peters, were interviewed about Despard's involvement in this work, including at the local school, and the role of 'Despard House', as part of Brian Harrison's Suffrage Interviews project, titled Oral evidence on the suffragette and suffragist movements: the Brian Harrison interviews. Despard lived above one of her welfare shops in one of the poorest areas of Nine Elms during the week. She converted to Roman Catholicism. She worked with women's and girls' clubs. In 1894, she stood and was elected as a Poor Law Guardian for Lambeth poor law union, and remained until she retired from the board in 1903.

== Politics ==
Despard became good friends with Eleanor Marx and was a delegate to the Second International, including to the fourth congress in London in 1896. She campaigned against the Boer War as a "wicked war of this Capitalistic government" and she toured the United Kingdom speaking against the use of conscription in the First World War, forming a pacifist organisation called the Women's Peace Crusade to oppose all war.

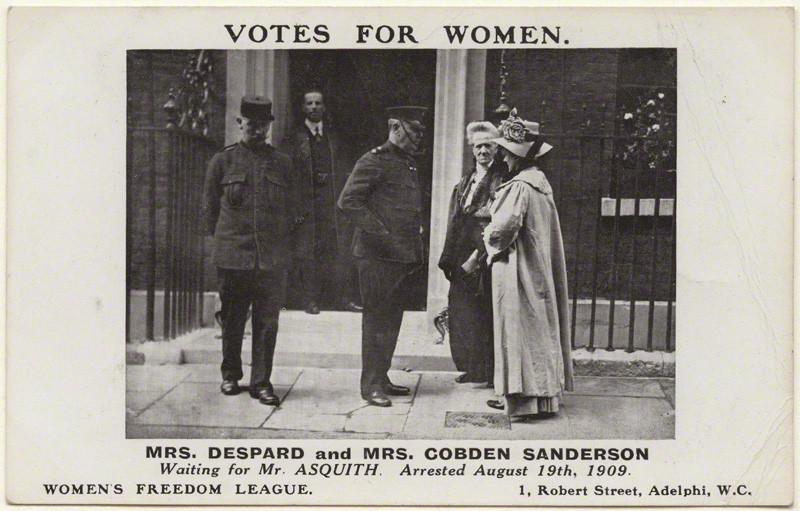
Despard and Anne Cobden-Sanderson outside No. 10 Downing St prior to being arrested on 19 August 1909

=== Women's suffrage ===
Despard was a vocal supporter of the Social Democratic Federation and the Independent Labour Party. In 1906 she joined the National Union of Women's Suffrage Societies and later was imprisoned four times for activism on women's franchise, twice in the Holloway prison. She had become frustrated with the lack of progress from NUWSS and she joined the more radical Women's Social and Political Union (WSPU). She became one of their recognised orators and described as a 'tireless and popular leader.. a striking figure with her thin sharp features and grimly tight lips'

In January 1907, Despard welcomed suffragettes just released from Holloway Jail. According to her, the occasion was "joyful". The meal took place in the Anderton Hotel, and others present included Christabel Pankhurst, Flora Drummond, Ann Fraser and Ivy Heppel.

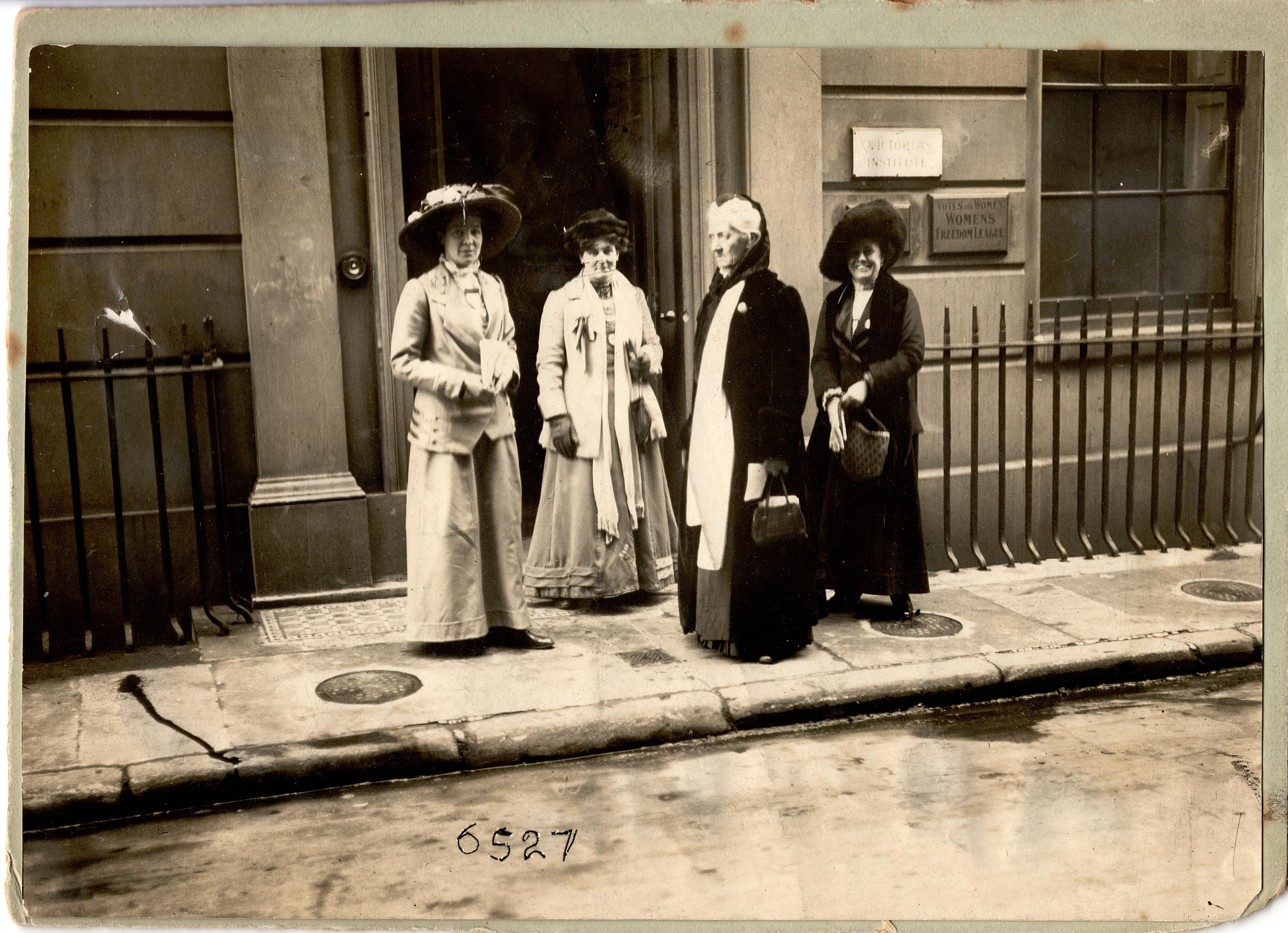
Charlotte Despard (2nd right) at the WFL offices with Edith How-Martyn, Mrs Sproson and Miss Tite

In 1907, Despard was one of the women who formed the Women's Freedom League (WFL) whose motto was 'Dare to be Free', after disagreements over the autocratic way in which the WSPU was run.

She was an active Catholic and on Ash Wednesday in 1907, she went with others to the House of Commons and got arrested. In establishing WFL, Despard was joined by Teresa Billington-Greig, Bessie Drysdale, Edith How-Martyn, Alice Abadam, Marion Coates-Hansen, among others, as signatories to a letter to Emmeline Pankhurst explaining their disquiet on 14 September 1907. In 1911, when first imprisoned with Nina Boyle, Despard was furious when someone paid the fines, allowing them to be released right away; Boyle remarked upon her 'complete and absolute fearlessness'.

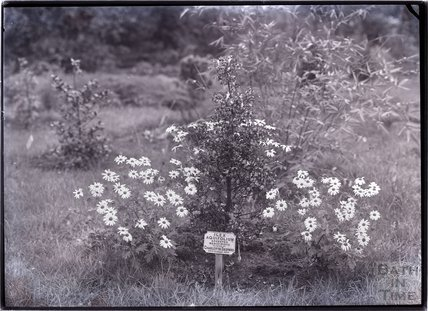
Tree planted by Charlotte Despard at Eagle House, Batheaston

Sylvia Pankhurst, imprisoned with Despard in 1907, remarked at her death that "She was one of our most courageous and devoted social workers. When I was in prison with her in 1907, I was impressed by her truly magnificent courage". She was one of the imprisoned women who had a tree planted in the 'suffragettes' rest' of the Blathwayts in Batheaston, Eagle House.

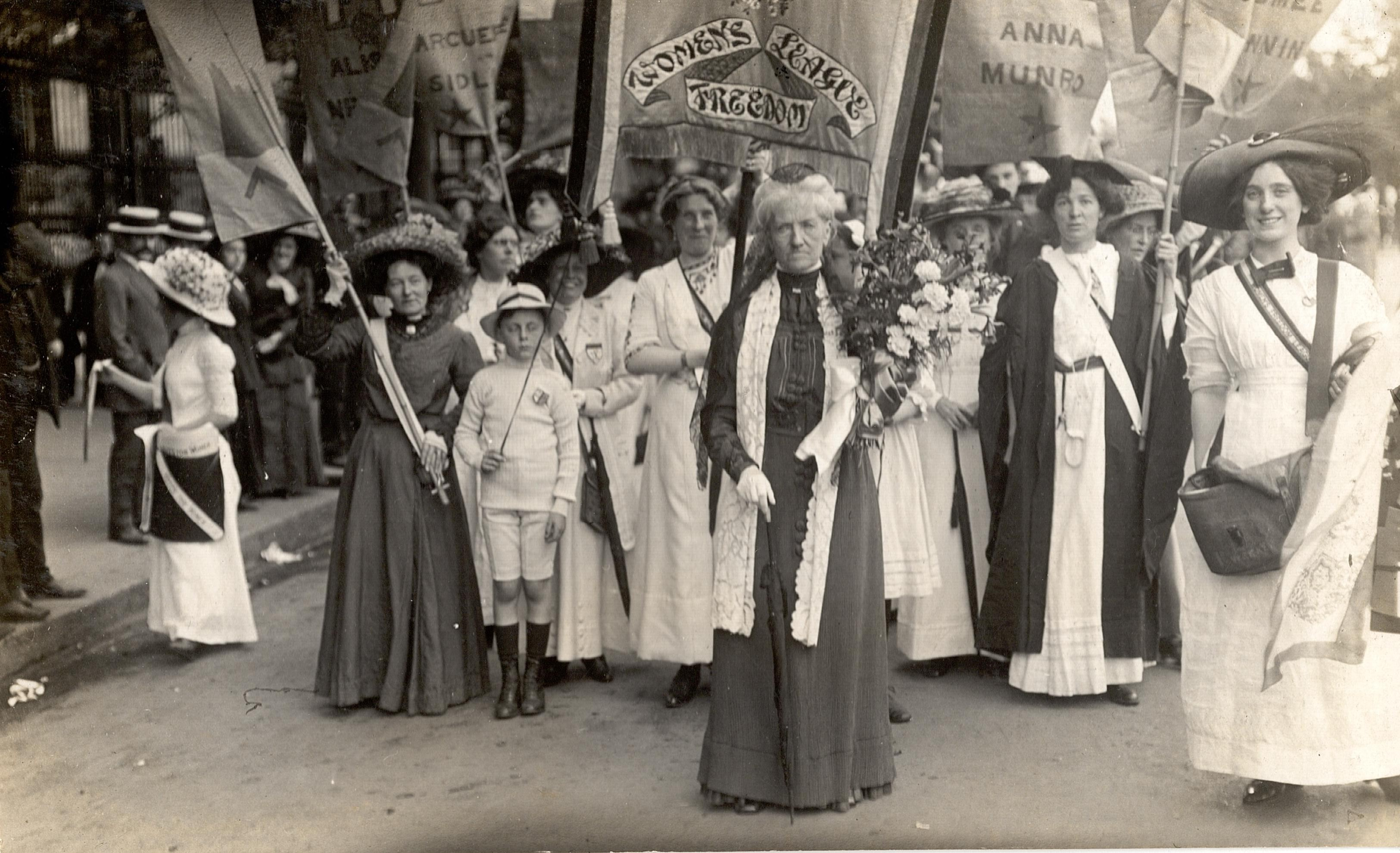
Charlotte Despard with WFL banner at Women's Coronation Procession, 17 June 1911

Despard was closely identified with new passive resistance strategies including women chaining themselves to the gate of the Ladies' Gallery in the Palace of Westminster; and was one of those leading a "no taxation without representation" campaign, during which her household furniture was repeatedly seized in lieu of fines, along with Virginia Crawford, as she realised that the women's movement groups had to work together at times as well. She led the delegation at the Women's Coronation Procession (1911).

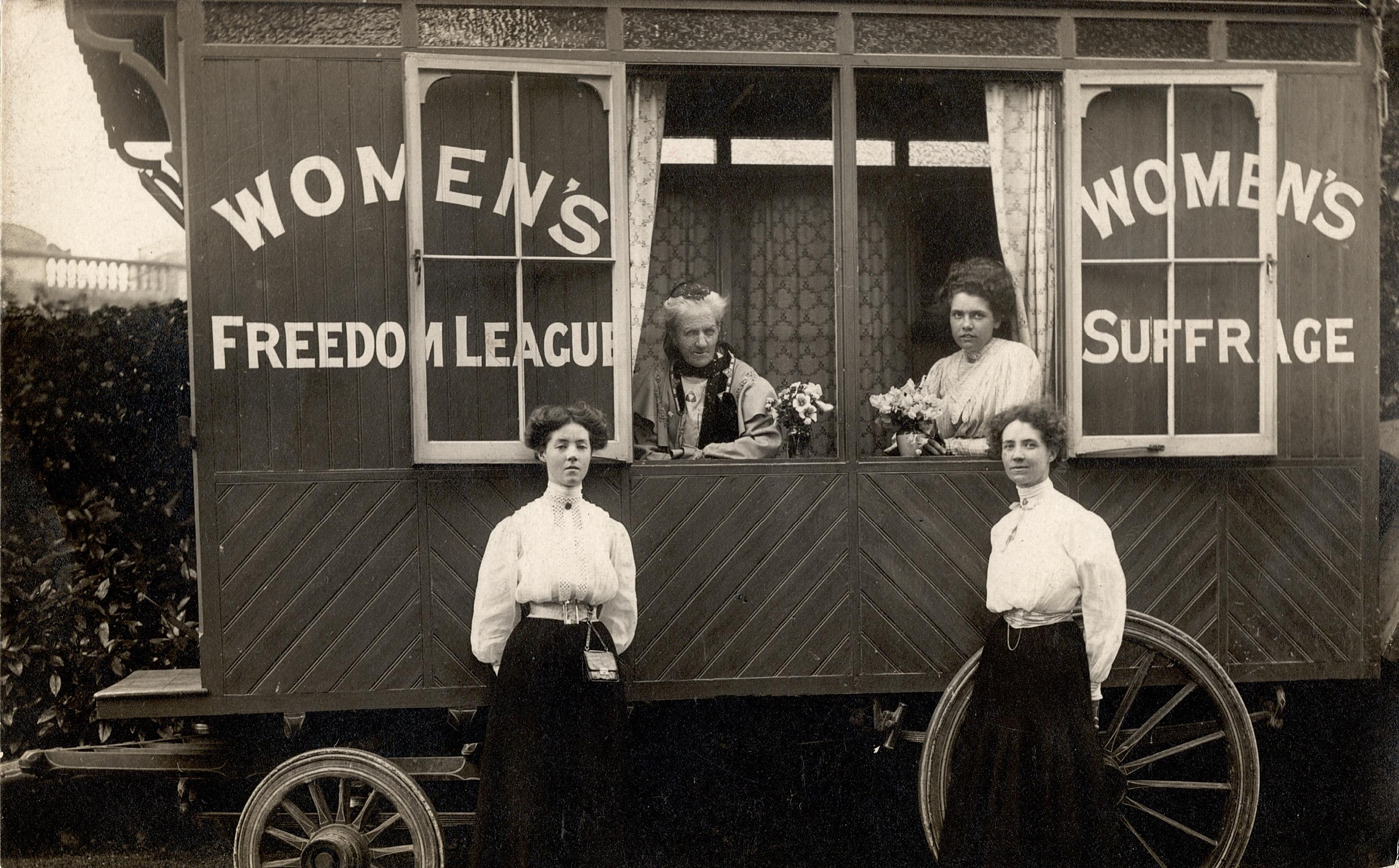
Despard and Alison Neilans inside the Women's Freedom League caravan

In 1909, she met Mahatma Gandhi in London, in her role in the Women's Freedom League. In 1912, at the seventh annual conference of WFL, she was pictured being greeted by Agnes Husband. The following September, she was with Agnes Husband again on the platform at Regent's Park.

In 1914, she spoke along with Anna Munro and Georgiana Solomon at the WFL Hampstead branch 'at home', hosted by Myra Sadd Brown, raising funds for the Women's Suffrage National Aid Corps. which Despard had founded.

From 1915 onward, she worked with Agnes Harben and others to maintain international women's movements representation in Britain. In 1919, she was one of twenty British delegates to the Women's International League Congress in Zurich (12–17 May). She is pictured next to Helen Crawfurd from Glasgow. She kept in communication with other suffragists, such as Daisy Solomon.

In 1928, Despard was one of the suffrage movement leaders at the celebratory breakfast for the passing of the Equal Franchise Bill.

=== Founding refugee hospital and school ===
From 1912 to 1921, she worked with Kate Harvey, another pacifist feminist and tax resister, along with other prominent members like Sophia Duleep Singh. She wrote in her diary re Kate Harvey that "the anniversary of our love" began on 12 January 1912, though it remains unclear the extent of what she meant by the words. Kate Harvey converted her house, Brackenhill, in Highland Road, Bromley, to a thirty-one-bed hospital, intended for wounded soldiers in World War I. However, refugee women and children were sent there instead. Despard and Harvey bought a 12-acre tract in Upper Hartfield, which they also called 'Brackenhill'. Harvey had become involved in Theosophy – as did Despard – and the children from Bromley were transferred to The Cloisters, an open-air school dedicated to that cause in Letchworth. The School in Hartfield became an Open Air School, which closed in 1939.

== Later life ==
Unlike other suffragists, Despard refused as a pacifist to become involved in the British Army's recruitment campaign during World War I, a stance different from that of her family: her brother, Field Marshal John French, was Chief of the Imperial General Staff of the British Army and commander of the British Expeditionary Force sent to Europe in August 1914, and their sister Katherine Harley served in the Scottish Women's Hospital in France.

She was an active member of the Battersea Labour Party during the early decades of the 20th century. She was selected as the Labour candidate for Battersea North in the 1918 General Election when then aged 74; however, her anti-war views were unpopular with the public and she was defeated.

She was a vegetarian and anti-vivisectionist. She was associated with London Vegetarian Society, becoming president in 1918 and vice-president in 1931, She supported the Save the Children charity and Indian independence movement. Despard was a board member of the World Congress of Faiths in the 1930s.

== Activism in Ireland, and communism ==
In 1908 Despard joined Hanna Sheehy-Skeffington, Margaret Cousins and other feminists to form the Irish Women's Franchise League. She urged members to boycott the 1911 Census and withhold taxes and provided financial support to workers during the 1913 Dublin lock-out.

Despard also had contact in Belfast with Elizabeth McCracken (the feminist writer "L.A.M. Priestly") who, like Despard, opposed the wartime suspension of suffragist agitation. In 1918, Despard provided a foreword to her dissection of the evolving relationship between the sexes,The Feminine in Fiction.

After World War I, she settled in Dublin and was a supporter of Éamon de Valera, remaining bitterly critical of her brother, now Field Marshal the Earl of Ypres, but they were later reconciled.

During the Irish War of Independence, together with Maud Gonne and others, she formed the Women's Prisoners' Defence League to support republican prisoners. She was classed as a dangerous subversive under the 1927 Public Safety Act by the Irish Free State government for her opposition to the Anglo-Irish Treaty and her house was occasionally raided by the authorities. She was recorded in the 1926 Irish Free State census at her house in Farranboley, Milltown, Dublin with Maud Gonne listed as a boarder, and Mary Barry O'Delaney as a visitor.

In 1930, Despard toured the Soviet Union to look at workers' conditions there. Impressed with what she saw, she joined the Communist Party of Great Britain. and became secretary of the Friends of Soviet Russia organisation. In 1933 her house in Dublin was burned down by an anti-communist mob. She met and was photographed with the Indian independence leader Subhas Chandra Bose when he visited Ireland in 1936.

She remained actively political well into her 80s and 90s, giving anti-fascist speeches in the likes of Trafalgar Square in the 1930s. She was also guest of honour at the Reading branch of the Women's Freedom League, of which she had been the first president, celebrating her 89th birthday, held in Anna Munro's garden at Venturefair, Aldermaston It was reported that 'Mrs. Despard had lost but little of her youthful vigour, clarity of speech and clearness of vision'. In her speech, she said that much had been achieved and quoted a Catholic priest who called women 'the basic force of the world' but noted that women 'still did not have the equality with men that there should be as regards the right to work', and went on to condemn slums and poverty (quoting Lenin) and condemned fascism and hatred. She urged women to act to help 'realise the worth of the human being, take life out of bondage all over the world."

She died, aged 95, after a fall at her new house, Nead-na-Gaoithe, Whitehead, County Antrim, near Belfast in November 1939. She was buried in the Republican Plot at Glasnevin Cemetery in Dublin.

== Legacy ==
On death, she was described as someone who "brought home to English people an understanding of what womenhood could be capable of when inspired by fiery ardour for what it truly believed to be a great cause for humanity". Sylvia Pankhurst remembered her "fine spirit" and said of Despard "She was one of our most courageous and devoted social workers".

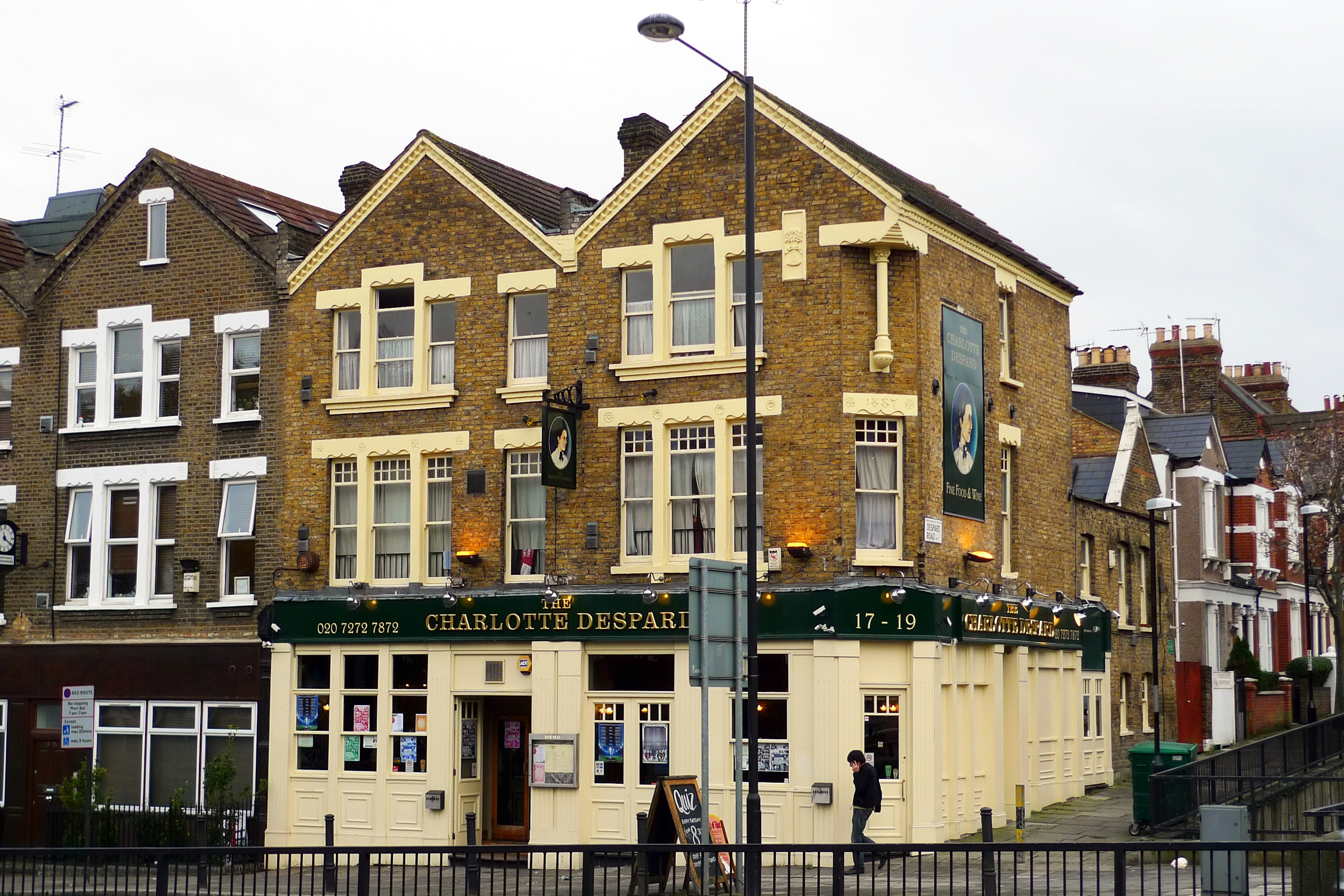
Pub named after Charlotte Despard, Archway Road, London N19

In London, two streets are named after her, one in Battersea, and another in Archway, Islington. At the end of the latter is the Charlotte Despard pub, named in her honour.

Her name and picture (and those of 58 other women's suffrage supporters) are on the plinth of the statue of Millicent Fawcett in Parliament Square, London.

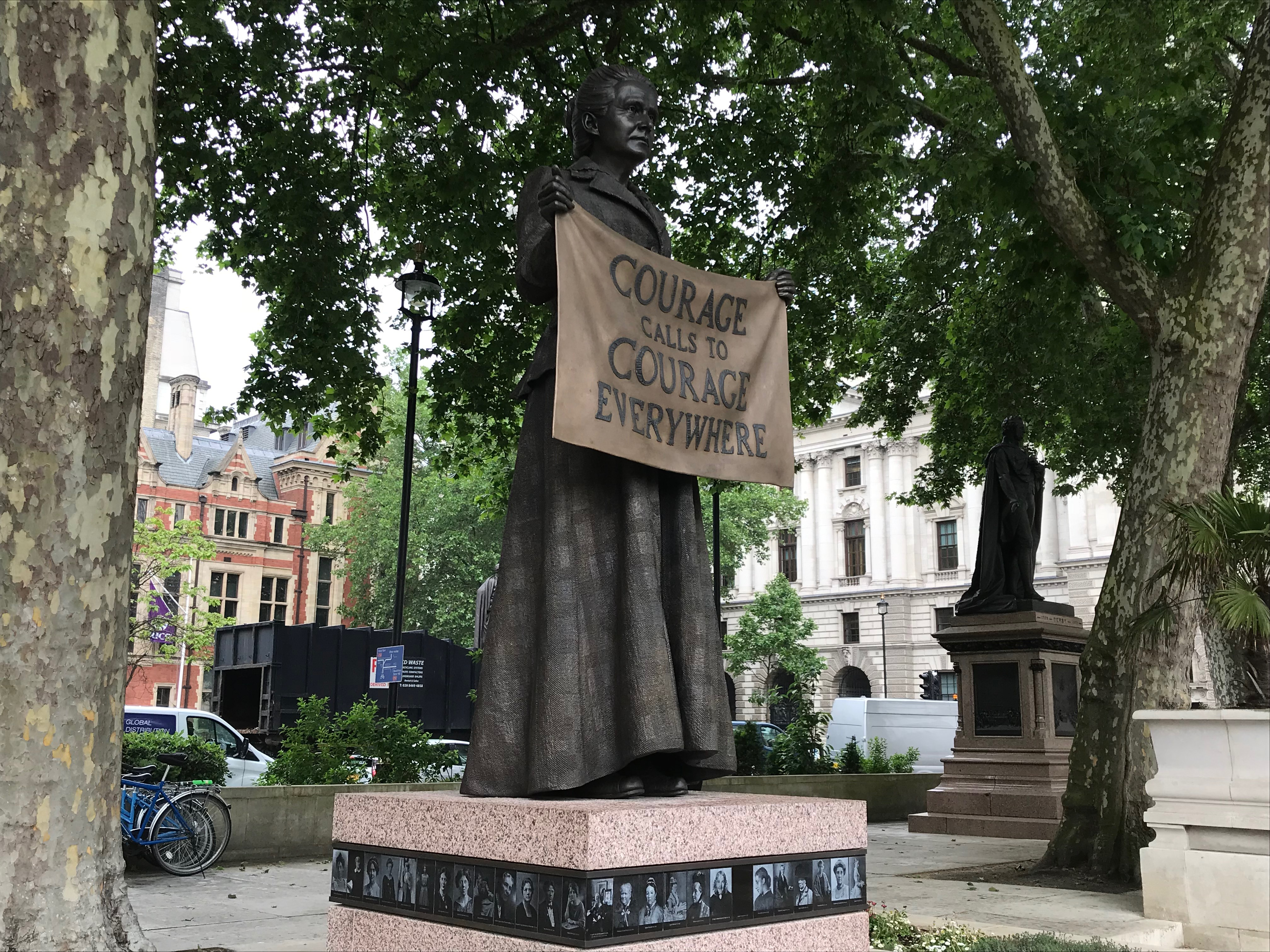
Millicent Fawcett statue, Parliament Square London. Despard's name and picture appear on the plinth

== Publications ==
- Chaste as Ice, Pure as Snow. Vol. I; Vol. II; Vol. III (Philadelphia: Porter and Coates, 1874)
- Jonas Sylvester (London: Sonnenschein and Co., 1886)
- The Rajah's Heir. A Novel. Vol. I; Vol. II (London: Smith, Elder & Co., 1890)
- A Voice from the Dim Millions; Being the True History of a Working Woman (1891)
- Economic Aspects of Woman's Suffrage (London: King, 1908)
- Collins, Mabel and Despard, Charlotte, Outlawed: A Novel on the Suffrage Question (London: Drame, 1908)
- Theosophy and the Women's Movement (London: Theosophical Society, 1913)

== See also ==
- Brown Dog affair
- List of suffragists and suffragettes
- Lizzy Lind af Hageby
