= Kate Harvey =

English suffragist and physiotherapist

- Born: Felicia Catherine Glanvill; 30 November 1862; Peckham, London, England
- Died: 29 April 1946 (aged 83); Hartfield, East Sussex, England
- Other names: Catherine Harvey, Felicia Kate Harvey, Katherine Felicia Harvey
- Occupations: charity worker, boarding house director, suffragist
- Years active: 1890s to 1946

Kate Harvey (30 November 1862 – 29 April 1946) was an English suffragist, physiotherapist, and charity worker. Profoundly deaf and widowed at a young age, she operated a home for women and children, and then later for disabled children. She participated in the Women's Tax Resistance League and was jailed for her refusal to pay tax if she were not allowed the right to vote. She was the first person imprisoned for failure to pay a tax under the Insurance Act.

== Early life ==
Felicia Catherine Glanvill was born on 30 November 1862 in Peckham, London. She married Frank Harvey and had three daughters, before she was widowed. She operated a home in her residence in Bromley for disabled children and was an early practitioner of physical therapy, at a time when Victorian society frowned upon women working in medicine, especially in a field which used physical contact.

== Suffrage ==
Harvey joined the Women's Freedom League (WFL)’s Bromley branch and by 1910 was one of the leading members of the organisation. She met and became close friends with Charlotte Despard, another widow involved in charitable works, who operated a home for the poor in Wandsworth. The exact nature of their relationship is unknown, but Despard recorded in her diary that "the anniversary of our love" began on 12 January 1912. Harvey organised the suffrage march which took place in June 1911 as part of the Women's Coronation Procession for George V. Despard, who was president of the WFL, led the suffrage march. When the 1911 census was taken, Harvey participated in the suffragette boycott and the enumerator wrote on her form "house filled with suffragettes who refuse information."

As early as 1911 Harvey, who had become a member of the Women's Tax Resistance League, engaged in a protracted battle with the Kent County Council for refusal to pay a stamp tax to obtain a license for her gardener. The Vote, the press organ of the WFL gave constant coverage of the conflict over the next two years. After several months, a warrant was issued for Harvey's arrest and she barricaded herself in her home. Refusing to pay taxes without having the ability to vote for her representation, after eight months, the barricade was broken and some of her property was seized in lieu of payment of the tax. A year later, having built stronger barricades and still refusing to pay, bailiffs broke through using a battering ram. Harvey was arrested and taken to the Bromley Police Court in August 1913, where she was ordered to pay fines under the Insurance Act. She refused to pay and was sentenced to serve two months in Holloway Prison. She was the first person sentenced under the Insurance Act, though two other suffragists had been imprisoned for failure to pay taxes in previous years for such things as dog licenses, carriage duties and inhabitant taxes. Protests about her arrest, attended by both men and women, cited the inequity of her fines being much higher than those imposed upon men for the same offence. After serving only one month of her sentence, Harvey was released because of concerns for her health. In November, authorities attempted to auction her belongings to pay her fines, but were forced to close the sale when no bids were made. She was awarded a medal from suffragists depicting the entry of Holloway Prison.

During the First World War, most suffragists suspended the campaign for enfranchisement, but Harvey and Despard, continued to press for reform and were ardent pacifists, speaking against war. The pair attended the Seventh Conference of the International Woman Suffrage Alliance in Budapest and were interested in promoting the international feminist movement. Both were also involved in the Theosophy movement, believing that moral and spiritual development of the individual would result in societal change. Harvey was described as "intensely pious" and conducted religious instruction for the children in her care in a chapel she built in her home. In 1916, Harvey and Despard bought a large house together, along with two cottages and a wood shed on twelve acres of land in Upper Hartfield at the edge of the Ashdown Forest. Naming the facility "Kurundai", they created a thirty-one-bed hospital for women and children. Though initially Despard paid expenses for some of the hospital patients, in 1917, the Theosophical Society became involved and the home was renamed as the Brackenhill Theosophical Home School. It housed children from broken homes, illegitimate children, as well as those who were sick or disabled and was directed by Harvey. In 1920, the Theosophical Society withdrew their support and moved the Theosophical Home School to the Old Rectory in Letchworth but Harvey continued operating the facility at Kurundai. (Note: The naming is confusing as there were two facilities with this name. Brackenhill's name apparently followed the school supported by the Theosophical Society, which later became St Christopher School, Letchworth. In 1925 a decision was made to close the theosophical school and use the facility to house the faculty for St. Christopher. When Harvey resumed directorship of her property in 1928, she called her boarding school the Brackenhill Open Air Home School, which had no relationship to the earlier organisation.) In 1921, Harvey and Despard split up after nine years together when Despard moved to Ireland. Harvey maintained sole ownership of the facility, but between 1923 and 1928 it was operated by the Invalid Children's Aid Association as a convalescent center for children who had rheumatic diseases and she moved to a house near the facility known as "Wroth Tyes".

In 1928, Harvey took over management again and converted Kurundai to a boarding school, which she called Brackenhill Open Air Home School. An open-air, facility, she focused on vegetarianism and physical exercise, providing the children with a "natural" life where they slept in the open air in shuttered shelters. The sides of the roofed dwellings only were shuttered in extremely poor weather. She continued to live at Wroth Tyes with the headmistress of the school, Helen Smith. The two women operated the school until the advent of the Second World War, when the government repurposed the estate for the war effort.

== Death and legacy ==
Harvey died at Wroth Tyes, in Hartfield, East Sussex, England on 29 April 1946 and left the Brackenhill property to Smith. In 2005, Harvey's suffragette medal was auctioned by Bonhams bringing £840 and renewed interest in the suffragette.
