= Alice Hart =

British philanthropist, artist, and businesswoman

- Born: Alice Marion Rowland; 1848
- Died: 1931 (aged 82–83)
- Known for: Philanthropy and art
- Notable work: Donegal Industrial fund
- Spouse: Ernest Hart

Alice Hart (born Alice Marion Rowland; 1848-1931) was a British philanthropist, artist, and businesswoman.

== Early life and education ==
Hart was born Alice Marion Rowland to Alex William Rowland and his wife, Henrietta Maria Margeretta Ditges. He was part of the Rowland Macassar oil company family. The family lived in London at Lower Sydenham. Hart was educated at the Apothecaries Society in London and went on to further study medicine in Paris. One of her sisters, Fanny, was badly brain-damaged. Another sister was Dame Henrietta Rowland Barnett who was also a philanthropist. Together these two sisters taught the poor at Toynbee Hall.

In 1872, Hart, along with Rose Minshull and Louisa Stammwitz, successfully petitioned for women to be allowed to use the laboratories of the Pharmaceutical Society of Great Britain. These three were the first women to apply for membership of the Society in 1873. After many refusals, Minshull and Stammwitz gained membership in 1879-90.

== Career ==
In 1883 Hart went to County Donegal with her husband where they discovered extreme poverty. Hart made an appeal publicly for money to deal with the acute issues but also saw the need to find a way to deal with the chronic unemployment in the area. She also noticed and was impressed by the standard of local craftmanship. She decided that the best option was to revive the local cottage industries, especially of weaving tweed. By the end of 1883 the Donegal Industrial Fund had been founded with £50 capital and contacts in London for a market for knits. In 1884 the Donegal tweed was shown at the London International Health exhibition and was so successful that Hart opened a shop at 31 New Cavendish St., London. Hart worked with the local weavers, sending designs and examples of Scottish tweeds to them and by experimenting with dyes from local plants. The result was dyes that won a Sanitary Institute of Great Britain medal.

In 1885 Hart expanded her ideas, appealing to Irish women for help in setting up embroidery schools which resulted in the ‘Kells embroidery’ schools. Classes were held all over the country teaching the embroidery of flax on linen using designs from Irish manuscripts and Japanese art. Hart may have created the Japanese designs herself as she and her husband owned an important collection of Japanese art and she was a noted watercolourist. She had paintings shown in both the Dudley and Dowdeswell galleries as well as being commended by the Magazine of Art in 1895 for her far east landscapes.

The Kells schools produced household items which were displayed at the London International Inventions Exhibition in 1885 where they won a gold medal. By 1886 the Donegal industrial fund moved to bigger premises into what became known as ‘Donegal House’ at 43 Wigmore St., London. They were given a grant to allow for further schools to be opened for instruction in weaving and embroidery. Hart also invested her own and her friends money into the business. In 1888 at the Irish Exhibition held in Olympia, London she set up the successful exhibit of the a ‘Donegal industrial village’. She followed the original crafts with investment in carpentry and woodcarving. Farm labourers from Donegal were brought to train in the Regent St. Polytechnic until the workshop was opened in Gweedore in October 1891. Apart from the more usual household goods the shop also got commissions from people like Lady Aberdeen. She initially assisted Hart in the creation of an industrial village at the Chicago World's Fair in 1893, though a later falling out meant that there were two such villages present.

Throughout the work with the fund Hart painted. After a trip to Burma with her husband she wrote a book on the people and the country. She became the editor of House Beautiful in 1904. The Donegal Industrial Fund itself didn't survive long after Hart was no longer involved. But it had created huge support for the industries and trained large numbers of people in the area.

== Bibliography ==
- Diet in sickness and in health / by Mrs. Ernest Hart, with an introduction by Sir Henry Thompson. London : Scientific Press. 1896.
- "The Micrometric Measurements Of The Blood Corpuscles And The Estimation Of Their Haemoglobin" (PDF). Nature. 23 (590). Springer Nature: 378. 1881. doi:10.1038/023378a0. ISSN 0028-0836. S2CID 5447994.
- The Third Or Invisible Norris Corpuscle
- "Memoirs: Note on the Formation of Fibrine". Journal of Cell Science. s2-22 (87). 1 July 1882. ISSN 0021-9533.
- Diets in Disease. 1893. S2CID 44150331.
- Hart, E. (12 December 1891). "Letters from Far Japan". The Hospital. 11 (272): 123–124. ISSN 0267-6478. PMC 5265281. PMID 29837514.
- Cornil And Ranvier's Pathological Histology (Translator)
- Picturesque Burma. 1897.

== Personal life ==
She married Ernest Hart in 1872, becoming his second wife. He was a surgeon and editor of the British Medical Journal. Hart ended managing the Donegal Industrial fund in 1896. Her husband had become unwell and he died in January 1898. They had no children. Hart died in 1931.
