= Veterinary pharmacist =

A veterinary pharmacist is a specially trained pharmacist who dispenses veterinary drugs and supplies or products and advice to owners of companion animals and livestock. In addition, they advise the regulatory bodies and are involved in the formulation of veterinary drugs. Veterinary pharmacy is a field of pharmacy practice, in which veterinary pharmacists may compound medications, fill prescriptions, and manage drug therapies for animals. Veterinary pharmacists are licensed pharmacists who specialize in the distribution of medications for animals.

== Synopsis and distinction ==
=== US profession ===
In the United States, this differs slightly from the title of "veterinary pharmacy specialist," who might additionally work in consulting, research, and education for veterinary pharmacy. Regular pharmacists in a variety of settings come into play in the preparation and dispensing of animal medications as well. As veterinarians treat a wide variety of animals with a wide variety of products, pharmacists can help manage these treatments through their compounding and drug knowledge. Compounding is often necessary for animal patients, as they require different dosages and medication forms from humans. Through compounding, pharmacists can adjust a medication for an animal so it is more appealing in taste or appearance. While there is currently no required veterinary pharmacy curriculum in place by the Accreditation Council for Pharmacy Education, the American Veterinary Medical Association understands that some veterinary education might be beneficial to pharmacists as community pharmacies continue to supply animal medications.

In addition to oversight by the FAO, and the OIE, which governs the Terrestrial Animal Health Code, the veterinary pharmacopeia is regulated by various governmental bodies, including

- USDA, the Animal and Plant Health Inspection Service and the Food and Drug Administration
- CFIA
- EMA and its Committee for Medicinal Products for Veterinary Use
- Veterinary Medicines Directorate

=== UK profession ===
In the United Kingdom Veterinary Pharmacy comprises four areas of practice:

- Public Health issues associated with human-animal contact, treatment and prevention of zoonotic disease and vector control
- Veterinary Medicinal Products involving the formulation and supply of veterinary medicinal products by dispensing or over the counter sale, Regulatory control.
- Animal Welfare involving the provision of advice, prescribing and supply of veterinary medicinal products where legal regulations allow and animal health planning,
- Business Administration including marketing veterinary services and financial control.

In the UK and Ireland, the term Veterinary Pharmacy is not solely the domain of the pharmacist. Other veterinary health care providers may provide elements of veterinary pharmacy to varying extents. Practising veterinary pharmacy does not imply necessarily that the person concerned is a registered pharmacist. A qualification for support staff working within the animal medicines industry was created by the UK Government in 2003, and holders were designated Suitably Qualified Persons (SQPs). SQPs are also known as Animal Health Advisors and are able to carry out veterinary functions similar to pharmacists, except for dispensing veterinary only medicines prescribed by veterinarians and in the distribution category POM-V. There is a similar system in Ireland.

== Education ==
=== US education ===
Currently, in the United States, the only available form of veterinary pharmacy education is that of elective courses in pharmacy schools, or in continuing pharmacy education courses. While veterinary pharmacy education is not readily incorporated into most pharmacy degree programs, select opportunities exist for pharmacy students and graduates through Advanced Pharmacy Practice Experiences (APPEs) and residency programs. Advanced Pharmacy Practice Experiences are 6-week rotations at different locations that must be completed by pharmacy students during their sixth year of study. The APPE options that exist in veterinary pharmacy are school specific for sixth-year pharmacy students, while the current existing veterinary pharmacy residencies are post-graduate year one residencies (PGY1). Currently, only four programs are in existence in the US at North Carolina State, Purdue University, University of Wisconsin-Madison, and UC Davis, none of which are to be applied for through the PhORCAS match, which is the Pharmacy Online Residency Central Application Service.

=== UK education ===
In the United Kingdom, pharmacists registered with the General Pharmaceutical Council may dispense and prescribe certain veterinary medicinal products without further training but many pharmacists would struggle to provide a confident and informed service as the amount of veterinary pharmacy included in the undergraduate programme is limited. Further, professional bodies require supplementary training for the practice of specialities.

In 1981, the Royal Pharmaceutical Society of Great Britain (RPSGB) initiated a Diploma in Agricultural and Veterinary Pharmacy (DAgVetPharm) for its Members; this was mainly focused on arable crops and livestock. Towards the end of the 2003 the agricultural element was dropped, the course was modularised with new sections added to cover emerging interest in public health and companion animal healthcare. The teaching location was subsequently transferred from the University of Aston in Birmingham to Harper Adams University where full accreditation was secured. Harper Adams University, the UK's first Agricultural University has an extensive Veterinary Pharmacy Education Programme (See https://www.harper-adams.ac.uk/courses/postgraduate/116) that includes certificates, post graduate diplomas and an MSc as well as ongoing CPD.

The Animal Medicines Training Regulatory Authority (AMTRA) registers SQPs and they may have species-specific qualifications or may have a qualification covering all species of animals. The training provided by Harper Adams University, leading to a formal academic qualification is provided for both pharmacists and SQPs.

== Practice settings ==
=== US practice ===
In the United States, veterinary pharmacy can vary from a clinical setting to a community pharmacy setting. As human medications become more popularly prescribed for animals and more community pharmacies begin to stock animal medication, one of the most common settings for veterinary pharmacy is in an independent, or compounding pharmacy. A compounding pharmacy is a typical establishment for "veterinary pharmacists," as these pharmacies specialize in compounding medication to better fit the needs of a patient, as is often necessary for animal patients. Additional practice sites include mail-order pharmacies or veterinary teaching hospitals. While these positions are less commonly available, pharmacists can be beneficial resources in veterinary schools, due to their knowledge of pharmacology. Of the 28 veterinary schools in the US, 27 employ pharmacists.

=== UK practice ===
In the United Kingdom opportunities exist for pharmacists and SQPs in clinical and non clinical environments:

- Academia
- Community Practice
- Pharmaceutical Industry
- Regulatory Affairs
- Retail establishments
- Veterinary Hospital Dispensaries
- Veterinary Practice Dispensaries

SQPs are being encouraged to act as signpost clients to pharmacists or other human health care providers if they detect public health issues particularly in response to zoonoses.

== Challenges in practice ==
In the United States, the main challenge to pharmacists in pursuit of a career in veterinary pharmacy is the minimal availability of concrete education on pharmacology in relation to different animals. While experts in drug usage in relation to human anatomy and physiology, the vast differences between humans and animals must be considered when preparing medications for animal patients. Some anatomical differences veterinary pharmacists need to take into account when preparing medication include:

- Body covering and body orientation
- Metabolic and toxicological differences
- Pharmacogenetic polymorphisms

These differences greatly affect what medications are safe and how these medications may work in different animals. Some of the most common human medications that must be altered for use in animals include levothyroxine for dogs, prednisone for cats, and insulin for both cats and dogs. It is the responsibility of the veterinary pharmacist to take into account the physiology of the individual animal to safely compound a successful and effective medication.

== History ==
=== United States ===
In the United States, The first mention of veterinary pharmacy may date back to around 1960, when literature was published synthesizing veterinary medicine and antibiotic usage. The role of a pharmacist in veterinary practice has expanded largely due to the workings of drug company production methods, in addition to prices of veterinary medication. For instance, veterinarians historically compounded medications themselves, due to a lack of commercially available veterinary medications. While this has changed, with multiple drug companies such as Merck Animal Health selling $3.3 billion worth of drugs for pets and livestock, due to expensive approvals necessary from the Food and Drug Administration (FDA), most drugs are often approved for one particular type of patient. As drugs may be approved for simply one species, compounding is extremely beneficial in veterinary medicine. Under the Animal Medicinal Drug Use Clarification Act, medicines may be compounded to fit the needs of more than one type of animal. Pharmacists are therefore valuable to veterinarians in their extensive knowledge of pharmacokinetics and pharmacology. An increasing number of pharmacies are stocking animal medications, which might require modification to best treat animals. For instance according to the FDA, 75,000 pharmacies compounded 6,350,000 medications for individual animals. Additionally, veterinary pharmacy has gained prominence due to the pricing of veterinary medication. As pet owners advocated for more options for their pets' medications in the US, the Fairness to Pet Owners Act was introduced into Congress, and would allow pet owners to find the cheapest medication for their pet.

=== United Kingdom ===
In the United Kingdom, pharmacists were involved in dispensing veterinary prescriptions, and even treating and euthanasing small animals up to the early 1950s, but this activity largely ceased with the escalating requirements of human health under the growing National Health Service and the passing of the Veterinary Surgeons Act 1966. There were a few pharmacies that supplied farmers, but it was not until the late 1970s when the term Veterinary Pharmacist came into currency. In 1981, the RPSGB Diploma course in veterinary pharmacy was initiated by professionals such as Michael Jepson and Steven Kayne, the former of whom led what was to become an institution until he retired in 2004.

== See also ==
- Medicated feed
- Pharmacist
- Veterinarian
- Veterinary medicine
