= Isabella Skinner Clarke–Keer =

British pharmacist

Isabella Skinner Clarke–Keer (née Clarke) (29 October 1842 – 30 July 1926) was a British pharmacist and pioneer of women in pharmacy. In 1875, she became the first woman to qualify as a Pharmaceutical Chemist, and was one of the first two women members (with Rose Minshull) of the Pharmaceutical Society of Great Britain, admitted in 1879. In 1905, she became the first President of the National Association of Women Pharmacists (then the Association of Women Pharmacists).

== Early life and education ==
Isabella Skinner Clarke was born on 29 October 1842 on 27 Skinner Street, London. It is not recorded whether her middle name was inspired by her parents' address. Her father, Edward Clarke, was a clerk at the time of her birth, but recorded as a solicitor in the 1861 census. Her mother was Elizabeth Clarke (née Pemberton). "Bella", as she was known, was their third child of seven. Annie Neve, who later served her apprenticeship with Isabella, described "a large family of happy, busy women."

Clarke passed the Pharmaceutical Society of Great Britain Preliminary Examination in 1874, coming 23rd out of 355 candidates, 186 of whom failed. She gained the required three years' experience partly through time spent with Elizabeth Garrett (later Anderson) at her St Mary's Dispensary for Women and Children, and partly with Robert Hampson , PSGB Council member and champion of women's rights. Historian Ellen Jordan has shown that both Garrett Anderson and Hampson were engaged with the Society for the Promotion of Employment for Women who had identified dispensing and pharmacy as a career into which women could be supported to enter.

Clarke registered with the Pharmaceutical Society as a chemist and druggist on 22 April 1875. She became a Pharmaceutical Chemist by passing the higher level Major exam on 15 December 1875, the first woman to achieve this. She came fourth out of 39 candidates, 16 of whom failed.

== Professional life ==
She established her own business in 1876 at Spring Street, Paddington, London. She took on a number of apprentices including Annie Neve (who was known in household as "Little Arsenic") and Lucy Boole. In the 1870s, Clarke took female medical students for their dispensing course at her pharmacy, and was appointed as tutor in pharmacy at the London School of Medicine for Women. By 1892, new facilities at the medical school included a materia medica museum used "for Mrs Clarke Keer's practical pharmacy class.”

On 15 January 1883, she married Thomas Henry Keer in Kensington. They had met when they were both students at Dr Muter's School of Pharmacy in Kennington, passing the Pharmaceutical Society Major exam on the same day as each other, with consecutive numbered certificates. After her marriage, she moved out from living with her widowed mother, dispenser sister Alice and artist sister Martha, and into 5 Endsleigh Street, Tavistock Square. She gave up her Spring Street business and became her husband's partner in a pharmacy at 9 Bruton Street, Berkley Square. In spite of her professional achievements, she and other women employees such as Margaret Buchanan were not permitted to work visibly in the shop. Buchanan recalled that "the presence of a woman would have been very detrimental to a pharmacist's business in those days, and more particularly to the class of business which Mr Keer conducted." She suffered a "crushing bereavement" when Thomas died, aged 46, on 14 January 1898. After his death, she began to take in boarders, later described as a Home for Students, and also ran a shorthand and typing business in Victoria Street.

=== Pharmaceutical Society of Great Britain ===
After years of drawn-out debate over women's place within the Pharmaceutical Society during the 1870s, its Council elected Clarke-Keer as one of its first two women members (with Rose Minshull) on 1 October 1879. Clarke-Keer had first applied for membership in October 1877, her application defeated 8 votes to 4 in the council. At the June 1878 meeting, the vote was drawn 8 on each side, but the President gave his casting vote against women joining the membership. At the Annual General Meeting in 1879, the result was first declared as 66 votes in favour of women becoming members and 65 against, but after a challenge, the vote was re-taken and the result was 78 in favour and 81 against. Finally at the Council meeting on 1 October 1879, Miss Clarke and Miss Rose Minshull were elected members, with only one vote in opposition. In spite of Robert Hampson's campaign, the conclusion was apparently reached by some Council members "to avoid further agitation", rather than through a comprehensive belief in equal rights.

=== Association of Women Pharmacists ===
On Thursday 15 June 1905, a group of women pharmacists met at 5 Endsleigh Street. Their aim was to establish an Association of Women Pharmacists. The group's objectives would be to discuss questions relating to women's employment, establish registers of locums and of all qualified women, and the "furtherance of social intercourse". Fifty women joined immediately. Clarke-Keer was persuaded “with some difficulty” to be the Association's first President, and went on to hold the position for two years. Many Association meetings were held in her dining room.

During the First World War, in her mid-70s, she did clerical work at the Admiralty.

== Death and legacy ==
She died in her sleep on 30 July 1926 at 123 Waddon Park Avenue, Croydon, aged 84. The cause of death was recorded as mitral disease of the heart and anasarca. She was buried at Brookwood Cemetery, Surrey.

In tributes after her death, Margaret Buchanan, her employee and her successor as President of the Association of Women Pharmacists explained that “her indomitable energy and savoir-faire carried her through many an awkward situation, which she in after years would describe with great glee.” Annie Neve, who served her apprenticeship with Clarke-Keer, was equally appreciative of her mentor: “The initiative, energy, moral courage, and enthusiasm for the advancement of pharmacy and for the betterment of the lot of all who toil and suffer, which she so conspicuously displayed during a long and beneficent life were a heartening and ennobling example to all who came within the sphere of her influence.”

In 2019 she was added to the Oxford Dictionary of National Biography.
