= Agnes Lothian =

British history of pharmacy scholar (1903 – 1980)

Agnes Edith Lothian Short (6 Jul 1903 – 13 Oct 1983) was a British pharmacist and librarian recognised for her expertise in the history of pharmacy, especially on drug jars.

== Early life ==
She was born Agnes Edith Lothian in 1903, the daughter of pharmacy teacher John Lothian.

She qualified as a pharmacist at Herriot-Watt College, Edinburgh in 1926, and worked at retail pharmacies in Redhill, Surrey and at Allen & Hanburys in London for ten years, also having a stint as a representative of a baby food manufacturer.

== History of pharmacy ==
In September 1940, she became librarian of the Pharmaceutical Society, where she would remain until 1968. She was elected Associate of the Library Association in 1944 and qualified as a librarian. This role put her in charge of the Society’s newly acquired historical collection of ceramics and proprietary medicines. She began a purchasing program to expand the collection, specialising in delftware and mortars. The most significant acquisition came in 1957 when she acquired the collection of her friend Geoffrey Eliot Howard. She also acquired the earliest known dated delft drug jar, a Worshipful Society of Apothecaries jar from 1647. After her retirement, she was appointed 'emeritus Keeper of the Society’s historical collections' in 1969, and continued to catalogue them.

From 1950, by which time she had collected nearly 300 drug jar inscriptions, she began making publications on these objects, and became recognised as a world expert in them.

Her expertise in the history of drug jars led to her becoming the first woman to be elected a member of the Académie International d’Histoire de la Pharmacie.

In 1973 she received the Fritz Ferchl medal from the German History of Pharmacy Society; and in 1977, the Schelenz-Plackette of the International Society for the History of Pharmacy, having addressed meetings of the ISHP in Germany, Austria, Yugoslavia and Greece. She was also a Fellow of the Pharmaceutical Society.

== Personal life and death ==
In 1967, she married G.R.A. Short, another Fellow of the Pharmaceutical Society.

She died on October 13, 1983.
