= Ernest Hart (medical journalist) =

English surgeon and editor (1835–1898)

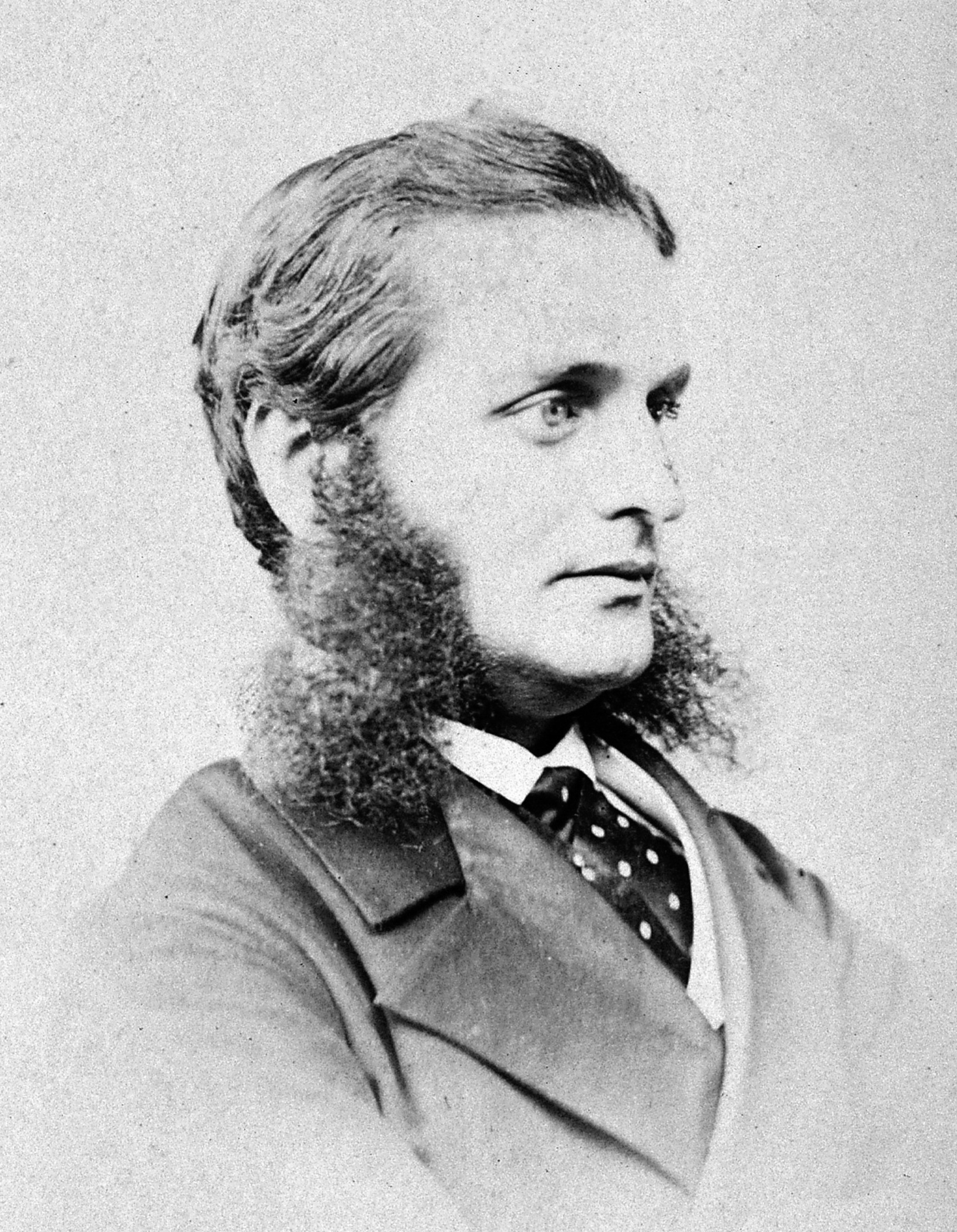
Ernest Abraham Hart

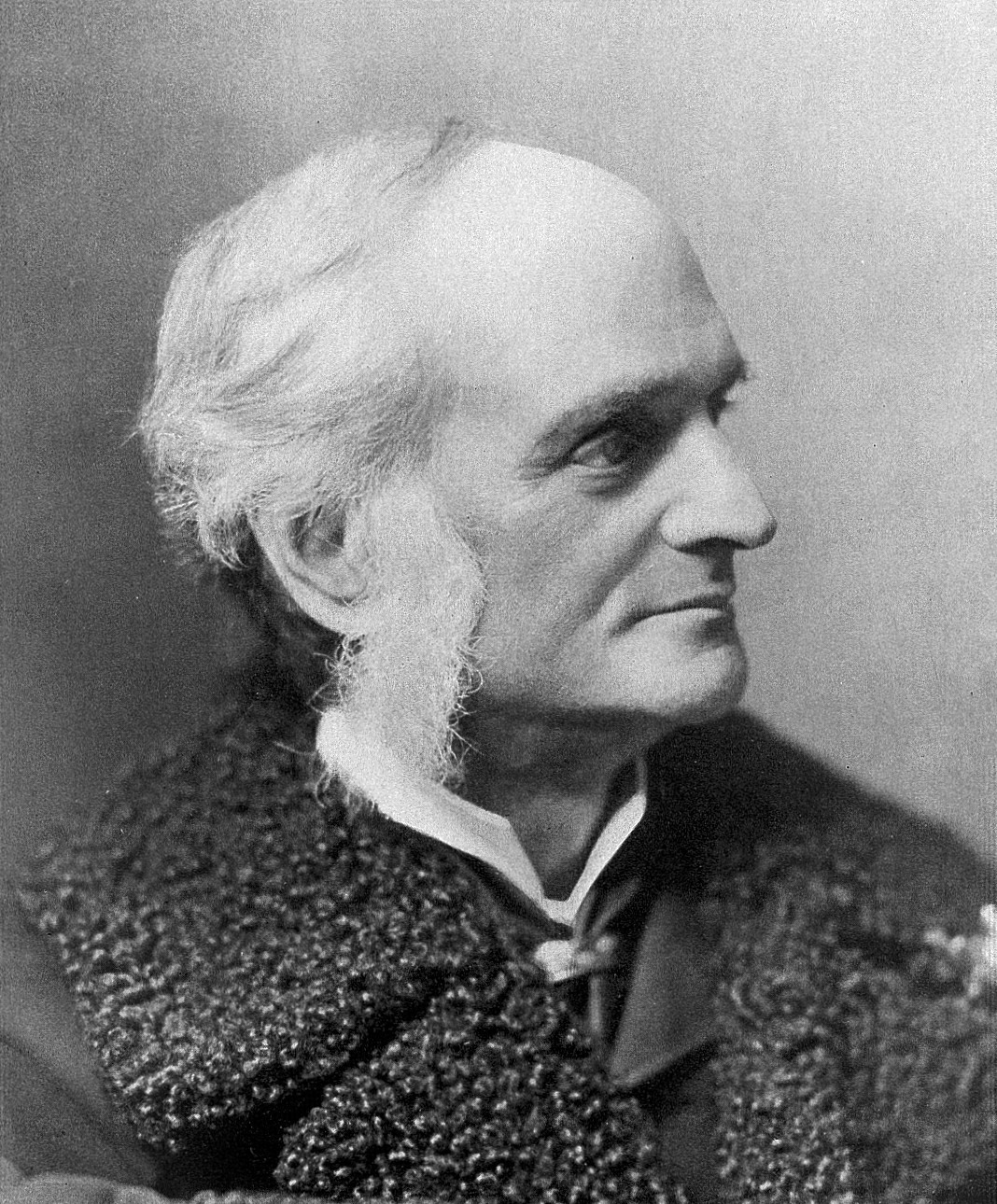
Ernest Abraham Hart

Ernest Abraham Hart (26 June 1835 – 7 January 1898) was an English surgeon and medical journalist. He was the editor of The British Medical Journal.

== Biography ==
Hart was born in London, the son of a Jewish dentist. He was educated at the City of London School, and became a student at St George's Hospital. In 1856, he became a member of the Royal College of Surgeons, making a specialty of diseases of the eye. He was appointed ophthalmic surgeon at St Mary's Hospital, London at the age of 28, and occupied various other posts, introducing into ophthalmic practice some modifications since widely adopted. His name, too, is associated with a method of treating popliteal aneurysm, which he was the first to use in Great Britain.

His real-life work, however, was as a medical journalist, beginning with the Lancet in 1857. He was appointed editor of the British Medical Journal on 11 August 1866. During this time, the British Medical Journal's harsh criticism of Isaac Baker Brown led to the destruction of Brown's career. As editor, Hart can be held accountable in part for this (as can the editor before him, William Orlando Markham). His campaigning editorials could be vicious. They were usually sententious and often self-congratulatory.

On 22 November 1866, Hart was appointed as a poor law inspector, as his colleague William Orlando Markham rejected the position. He took a leading part in the exposures which led to the inquiry into the state of London work-house infirmaries, and to the reform of the treatment of sick poor throughout England, and the Infant Life Protection Act 1872 (35 & 36 Vict. c. 38), aimed at the evils of baby farming, was largely due to his efforts. The record of his public work covers nearly the whole field of sanitary legislation during the last thirty years of his life.

He had a hand in the amendments of the Public Health and of the Medical Acts, always promoting the medical profession above others in the public health field; in the measures relating to notification of infectious disease, to vaccination, to the registration of plumbers; in the improvement of factory legislation; in the remedy of legitimate grievances of Army and Navy medical officers; in the removal of abuses and deficiencies in crowded barrack schools; in denouncing the sanitary shortcomings of the Indian government, particularly regarding the prevention of cholera.

In 1880, Hart authored the book The Truth About Vaccination. It refuted the arguments made by anti-vaccinators. Each anti-vaccination allegation was disproved with medical and statistical evidence. Hart demonstrated from a vast body of evidence the advantages of how a vaccinated person can resist an attack of smallpox, compared to those unvaccinated.

His work on behalf of the British Medical Association is shown by the increase from 2,000 to 19,000 in the number of members, and the growth of the British Medical Journal from 20 to 64 pages, during his editorship. From 1872 to 1897 he was chairman of the Association's Parliamentary Bill Committee.

Hart was also editor of The Sanitary Record for a period, and chairman of the National Health Society.

== Selected publications ==
- An account of the condition of the infirmaries of London workhouses, 1866
- The Truth About Vaccination: An Examination and Refutation of the Assertions of the Anti-Vaccinators (1880)
- Hypnotism, Mesmerism and the New Witchcraft (1896)

== Personal life ==
Hart married his first wife, Rosetta Levy, in 1855. He married his second wife, Alice Marion Rowland, in 1872, the sister of social reformer Henrietta Barnett. Rowland had herself studied medicine in London and Paris, and was no less interested than her husband in philanthropic reform. She was most active in her encouragement of Irish cottage industries, and was the founder of the Donegal Industrial Fund.

Beginning his collections by contacting Tadamasa Hayashi in 1882, Hart became a prominent collector of Japanese Art and later joined the Japan Society, frequently giving lectures on subjects such as Lacquerware. In 1891 he travelled to Japan with his second wife, Alice Hart.
