= Rose Coombes Minshull =

Rose Coombes Minshull (1845–1905) was one of the first two women members (with Isabella Clarke) of the Pharmaceutical Society of Great Britain (PSGB), admitted in 1879.

== Early life and education ==
She was born on the 3rd of August 1845 at 19 Bradford Street, St Martin's, Birmingham, and baptised on 22nd of August. Her father, John Bellamy Minshull (c. 1811-1884), a wood turner, and her mother Elizabeth (c. 1813-1878) already had one daughter Jane (born c. 1842), and went on to have Flora (born c. 1847) and Albert (born c. 1851). The family had moved to London before Albert's birth, and by the 1871 census were at 149 Mile End Road, with an intriguing mix of craft and professional skills and occupations. Jane and Rose were both listed as “medical dispenser”, while their father was a bristle merchant, Flora was an engraver on wood, and Albert was an apprentice to the brush trade.

Historian Ellen Jordan discovered that Rose was one of the pioneering women pharmacists who were supported to go into dispensing via The Society for Promoting the Employment of Women, which had been founded in 1859. The Society appears to have arranged for Rose, alongside Louisa Stammwitz and Isabella Clarke, to be mentored by Elizabeth Garrett (later Anderson) at her St Mary's Dispensary for Women and Children in Marylebone, which opened in 1866. The women were also aided by Robert Hampson (1833-1905), a champion for equality within the PSGB Council.

Rose was a very talented student, coming top of 166 candidates in the PSGB Preliminary Exam in 1873. However, Hampson's motion at the PSGB Council meeting in February 1873 to allow Minshull, Stammwitz and Alice Hart to become "registered students” was rejected by one vote. Minshull and Stammwitz, alongside Isabella Clarke all studied at Dr Muter's South London School of Pharmacy which opened in Kennington in 1870, allowing these aspiring women pharmacists to receive a comprehensive pharmaceutical education. Louisa Stammwitz recalled later "Miss Minshull and I had considerable difficulty in obtaining instruction in a chemical laboratory until Dr Muter very kindly opened his to women." Although never excluded from the PSGB exams, women were only allowed to attend lectures at the PSGB school of pharmacy from 1872, and were not permitted to enter its chemistry laboratories. Minshull, Hart and Stammwitz petitioned the PSGB Council to allow ladies access to its labs, stating in a letter to the Pharmaceutical Journal that “All we ask is to be allowed the same opportunities for study, the same field for competition and the same honours, if justly won.” Permission for women to work in the labs was granted in 1877 after Minshull and Stammwitz had passed the PSGB Minor examination, the two of them achieving the top two places in the chemistry exam. Minshull registered as a Chemist & Druggist on 18 October 1877. She passed the higher Major examination and registered as a Pharmaceutical Chemist on 19 February 1879, having been prevented by her mother's death from taking the exam alongside Stammwitz in 1878.

After years of drawn-out debate over women's place within the PSGB during the 1870s, Hampson's motion to admit women to full PSGB membership was finally carried at the Council meeting on 1 October 1879, with only one vote in opposition. Rose Minshull and Isabella Clarke were elected members of the Society. They had both passed the Society's Preliminary, Minor and Major exams. They made repeated applications for membership from 1875 onwards and in spite of Robert Hampson's campaign, the conclusion was apparently reached by some Council members "to avoid further agitation", rather than through a comprehensive belief in equal rights.

== Professional life ==
In 1881, aged 36, Rose was still living with her widower father, her sister Flora who was now working as a dispenser, and a servant. After her father's death in 1884, Rose and Flora continued to live together, but during that year Rose changed her address in the PSGB Register to North Eastern Hospital for Children, Goldsmith Row, Hackney Road, London, where she worked as the Dispenser. She was well aware that women working in this position were judged differently from men, writing

“Of course she must know her work thoroughly, for she will find it to be more sharply criticised than a man’s would be in the same position, keep well posted up in the current pharmaceutical literature, so as to have at her fingers’ ends, when applied to, all that related to new remedies..."

However she wrote in an article for The Chemist and Druggist: “As the result of many years’ hospital work, I am decidedly of the opinion that certainly in women's and children's hospitals a lady dispenser is the right woman in the right place.” In 1899, her sister Flora, aged 52, achieved a dispensing qualification, when she took the Apothecaries’ Assistant's examination, having worked in this role for at least 18 years.

== Death and legacy ==
Rose died aged 58 on 9 May 1905 at Brooklyn House, 11 Marine Parade, St Mary in the Castle, Hastings. The cause of death was recorded as “carcinoma of mediavinal and mesentent glands 10 months” and pneumonia. Flora was present at her sister's death, although still recorded as resident in London. Rose was buried on 13 May 1905 in Tower Hamlets.

She was described in her obituary in The Chemist and Druggist as “not by nature a fighter, but a bright and charming little woman, of an affectionate nature.”

In 2019 she was added to the Oxford Dictionary of National Biography.

== Sources ==
- Birth certificate, 1845
- Census: 1871, 1881, 1901
- Pharmaceutical Society of Great Britain Registers
- Death certificate, 1905
- Burial record, 1905
