= Claire Anderson (scientist) =

British pharmacist

- Education: Cardiff University; King's College London
- Scientific career
- Workplaces: University of Nottingham
- Thesis: Health promotion by community pharmacists (1997)

Claire Anderson is a British pharmacist who is a professor at the University of Nottingham. She investigates pharmacy practice research, and developed the first diploma in community pharmacy.

== Early life and education ==
Anderson studied pharmacy at Cardiff University and graduated with a bachelor's degree in 1982. She then worked as a clinical pharmacist in hospital and a community pharmacist in Oxford. In 1989, she was appointed postgraduate tutor for the Oxford regional health authority and to the pharmacy faculty at King's College London. Whilst at King's, she worked toward a doctorate, where she investigated the role of community pharmacists in promoting health. In particular the Barnet High Street health scheme. Anderson developed a postgraduate masters and diploma in community pharmacy at King's.

== Research and career ==
Anderson was appointed to the faculty at the University of Nottingham in 1999. She was promoted to a personal chair in social pharmacy in 2003. She is a leading social pharmacy researcher her work focuses on designing and evaluating pharmacy practice and health service models and exploring patient's experiences of using medicines. Her research seeks to improve patient and public health in the light of contemporary health care reforms. More recent interests are global health professional education and human resources for health. She has extensive research leadership experience within pharmacy and across a number of health, education and social science disciplines. She seeks to combine in depth qualitative and ethnographic methodologies with the practical demands of producing timely and formative research outcomes that can inform and change practice and policy.

In 2019, Anderson was elected Chair of the English Pharmacy Board. She is a member of the International Pharmaceutical Federation Board of Pharmacy Practice. In 2021, Anderson was elected President of the Royal Pharmaceutical Society.

== Selected publications ==
- Claire Anderson (1 October 2010). "Presenting and evaluating qualitative research" (PDF). American Journal of Pharmaceutical Education. 74 (8): 141. doi:10.5688/aj7408141. ISSN 0002-9459. PMC 2987281. PMID 21179252. Wikidata Q41737300.
- Tony Avery; Claire Anderson; C M Bond; et al. (1 May 2011). "Evaluation of patient reporting of adverse drug reactions to the UK 'Yellow Card Scheme': literature review, descriptive and qualitative analyses, and questionnaire surveys". Health Technology Assessment. 15 (20): 1–234, iii–iv. doi:10.3310/hta15200. ISSN 1366-5278. PMID 21545758. Wikidata Q37872384.
- Claire Anderson; Alison Blenkinsopp; Miriam Armstrong (1 September 2004). "Feedback from community pharmacy users on the contribution of community pharmacy to improving the public's health: a systematic review of the peer reviewed and non-peer reviewed literature 1990-2002". Health Expectations. 7 (3): 191–202. doi:10.1111/j.1369-7625.2004.00274.x. ISSN 1369-6513. PMC 5060240. PMID 15327458. Wikidata Q31108024.
