= Pharmacy Practice Research Trust =

British charity

The Pharmacy Practice Research Trust (PPRT) was an independent charity established in July 1999, by the Royal Pharmaceutical Society. It aims were support and promote the professional practice and development of pharmacists and develop the field of Pharmacy Practice Research. In January 2013 the PPRT waswound up and a new charity Pharmacy Research UK was launched in its place.
