= British Pharmaceutical Codex =

British pharmaceutical publication

The British Pharmaceutical Codex (BPC) was first published in 1907, to supplement the British Pharmacopoeia which although extensive, did not cover all the medicinal items that a pharmacist might require in daily work. Other books existed, such as Squire's, but the BPC was intended to be official, published by the Pharmaceutical Society of Great Britain (PSGB). It laid down standards for the composition of medicines and surgical dressings.

Subsequent editions were published in 1911, 1923, 1934, 1949, 1954, 1959, 1963, 1968, and finally 1973.

The 1934 edition was described by the British Medical Journal as "one of the most useful reference books available to the medical profession".

In 1963 Edward G Feldmann, director of revision for the US National Formulary, described it as "a compilation of highly authoritative and useful therapeutic (actions and doses) information as well as a valuable compendium of recognised standards and specifications".

In 1979 a new edition was published with a new title, The Pharmaceutical Codex. The Medicines Commission had recommended in 1972 that the British Pharmacopoeia should henceforth be the only compendium of official standards for medicines in the UK, and the BPC lost its status as an official book. The PSGB remained as the publishers.

The current edition is the 12th, published in 1994.
