= Upper Hartfield =

Village in East Sussex, England

Coordinates: 51.0930°N 0.0917°E

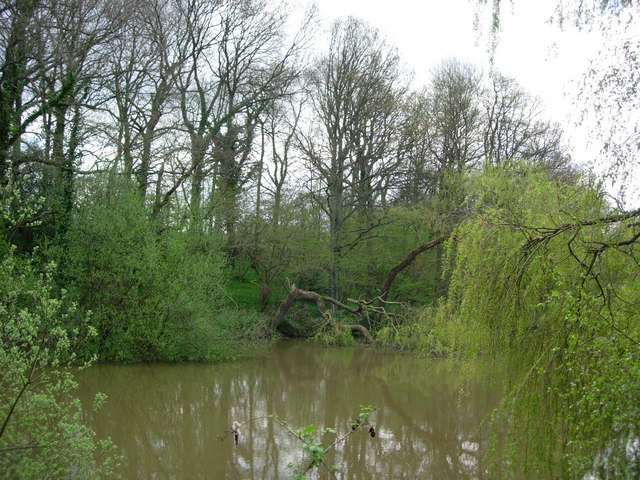
Pond in Parrock Lane

Upper Hartfield is a small village slightly west of Hartfield in East Sussex, England. The Tudor house "Apedroc" in Upper Hartfield is the former home of Sir Michael Balcon. More recently the house was owned by the musician Alan Parsons.
