= Margaret Elizabeth Buchanan =

British pharmacist (1865–1940)

- Born: 26 July 1865; Clerkenwell, London
- Died: 1 January 1940 (aged 74)
- Education: Pharmaceutical Society's School of Pharmacy
- Known for: cofounder of the National Association of Women Pharmacists first woman to be elected to the Council of the Pharmaceutical Society of Great Britain
- Scientific career
- Fields: pharmacy
- Workplaces: Westminster General Infirmary; Margaret Buchanan School of Pharmacy for Women

Margaret Elizabeth Buchanan (26 July 1865 – 1 January 1940) was a British pharmacist and pioneer of women in pharmacy.

== Early life and education ==
Buchanan was born in Clerkenwell, London, to Albert Buchanan, a physician, and Elizabeth Anne Blake. She was educated at North London Collegiate School. She qualified as a pharmacist in 1887 having served her apprenticeship with her father, and subsequently with Isabella Clarke-Keer and her husband Thomas Keer. She enrolled as a student in the Pharmaceutical Society's School of Pharmacy in Bloomsbury Square in 1886. She passed the Minor exam and registered as a Chemist and Druggist later that year. She passed the Major examination in 1887, gaining a silver medal for taking second place in the Pereira competition, the first woman to achieve this.

== Career ==
She started as a hospital dispenser at the Westminster General Infirmary, the first registered Pharmaceutical Society member to hold the post. In 1892, she wrote that "it is becoming recognised by the public and the trade that women can be both business-like and well-trained scientifically, the number of lady-pharmacists will doubtless increase as the field further opens up." When Henry Deane's pharmacy at 16 The Pavement, Clapham Common became available, in October 1914, she took the opportunity to establish a business that could also contribute to the position of women in the profession. Buchanan was one of four directors, all registered women pharmacists, alongside Agnes Borrowman, Sophia Heywood and Margaret MacDiarmid. By 1923, of the 15 young women from the business who studied at the Pharmaceutical Society School of Pharmacy, 14 had taken prizes and scholarships. In 1924, she transferred the business to Borrowman.

By 1913 she had founded the Margaret Buchanan School of Pharmacy for Women at Gordon Hall, Gordon Square. The first educational listing to include her name appears in The Chemist and Druggist journal on 16 August 1913 with the text "Miss Buchanan trains ladies in pharmacy. Apply by letter for particulars of courses and individual coaching." She offered a 10-month course for the examination of the Society of Apothecaries for £21. Students at the School worked at the Clapham Pharmacy, three in the morning and three in the afternoon. In 1914, the school's principals were listed as Miss Margaret Buchanan and Miss SJ Heywood, one of Miss Buchanan's co-directors at the Clapham Common pharmacy. In 1917, a Miss D Maughan was added to the staff listings. By 1921, Miss Buchanan was no longer associated with the school and Elsie Hooper and Katherine King was announced as joint proprietors. She also worked as Lecturer in Pharmacy at the London School of Medicine for Women and was a member of the Teachers' Guild.

== Professional roles ==
She was one of the founders of the National Association of Women Pharmacists serving as its first Vice-President from its establishment in 1905, and becoming its President in 1909. In 1918, she became the first woman to be elected to the Council of the Pharmaceutical Society of Great Britain. Remembering her election, a contemporary wrote "The consternation that arose in certain quarters is one of those things not easily forgotten." She travelled extensively in Canada in 1922 as the Council’s representative, leading to a reciprocity agreement between the Society and the province of Ontario. She also served as the Chairman [sic] of the Society's Benevolent Fund Committee. She was a strong supporter of the establishment of a University of London Bachelor of Pharmacy degree, instituted in 1924. She retired due to ill health in 1926. She was described in The Chemist and Druggist as holding 'the front rank among the women pharmacists of the British Empire.'

== Death and legacy ==
She retired to Devon, where she died on New Year's Day in 1940. An article about Buchanan summed her up as "the woman among British pharmaceutical women, a guide, philosopher, and friend to many of them."

In 2019 she was added to the Oxford Dictionary of National Biography.
