= Chemist + Druggist =

UK online publication

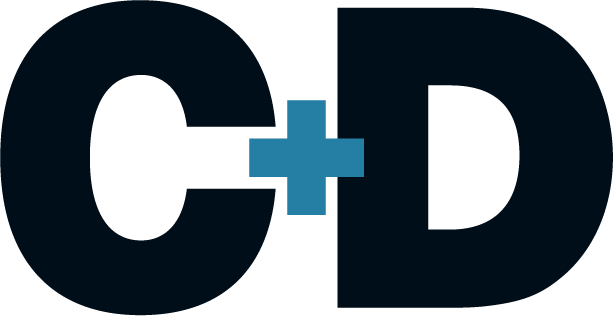
Logo of Chemist + Druggist

Chemist + Druggist (also known as C+D) is an online publication aimed at community pharmacists and pharmacy staff in the United Kingdom.

Chemist + Druggist was founded as a weekly print magazine by brothers William and Septimus Morgan in 1859. Its final print issue was published in December 2016, and since then it has continued to publish the latest community pharmacy news, analysis, comment, and learning articles, both on its website and via daily newsletters.

The Chemist + Druggist website is audited by the Audit Bureau of Circulations, and in 2017 attracted an average of 69,729 unique users per month.

Chemist + Druggist is owned by Citeline (itself owned by Norstella), and the Chemist + Druggist brand also includes a trade jobs website (C+D Jobs), a medicines database, and an annual awards ceremony for community pharmacists and staff (C+D Awards).

C+D Data owns and maintains the PIP Code, a unique coding system of seven digits that the pharmacy supply chain use to order pharmaceutical products. These codes are listed against each product on cddata.co.uk where subscribers can access over 100,000 UK pharmacy products that are regularly updated by wholesalers and manufacturers.

In addition to the website, the Chemist + Druggist Price List is issued monthly to subscribers. This comprises a comprehensive listing of healthcare products available in the UK, along with product codes and manufacturer information.

Chemist + Druggist also had a sister magazine, OTC, aimed specifically at medicines counter assistants, dispensers, technicians and pharmacy support staff. It was distributed free every month with Chemist + Druggist from 1989 until 2013.
