= National Association of Women Pharmacists =

UK female workers association

The National Association of Women Pharmacists was founded in London on 15 June 1905, following discussions between Margaret Elizabeth Buchanan and Isabella Skinner Clarke. Early meetings were held at Clarke's home. Membership was restricted to those who had passed the major or minor examination and 50 women joined immediately. By 1912 Buchanan claimed that practically all women practicing pharmacy were members. Buchanan served as its president at one point.

Elsie Hooper (1879–1969) was the first secretary. She and other members joined the Women's Coronation Procession, a 40,000-strong march from Westminster to the Albert Hall, on 17 June 1911 in support of votes for women. In June 1911 the Chemist and Druggist carried photographs of women pharmacists in the march and reported "Miss Elsie Hooper, B.Sc., was in the Science Section, and several other women pharmacists did the two-and-a-half hours’ march."

The association is supportive of, and collaborates with, the Royal Pharmaceutical Society, but is an independent organisation.

The Annual General Meeting in 2019 decided to wind up the association at the end of 2019 but it will continue as a semi-autonomous network within the Pharmacists' Defence Association.
