= The Pharmaceutical Journal =

- Discipline: Pharmacology
- Language: English
- Edited by: Tony Scully

Publication details
- History: 1841–present
- Publisher: Royal Pharmaceutical Society (United Kingdom)
- Frequency: Monthly

Standard abbreviations
- ISO 4: Pharm. J.

Indexing
- ISSN: 0031-6873

Links
- Journal homepage; Online archive

The Pharmaceutical Journal is a professional journal covering various aspects of pharmacy, including pharmacology and pharmaceutics. It is published by, and is the official journal of, Britain's professional organisation for pharmacists, the Royal Pharmaceutical Society (formerly the Royal Pharmaceutical Society of Great Britain).

The PJ is considered to be "among the oldest professional journals in the world". It first appeared in July 1841 as a monthly journal called Transactions of the Pharmaceutical Meetings (or Pharmaceutical Journal and Transactions); it became The Pharmaceutical Journal in 1895, The Pharmaceutical Journal and Pharmacist in 1909, and back to The Pharmaceutical Journal in 1933. It was originally produced by Jacob Bell, who was one of the founders of the (Royal) Pharmaceutical Society. The monthly publication became a weekly journal in 1870.

After it became the Pharmaceutical Journal and Transactions in 1842, "within a year it had all the features of an orthodox professional journal: leading articles, meeting reports, critical commentaries, letters, and book reviews. In 1859, Bell bequeathed the journal to the Pharmaceutical Society on his deathbed.

Its first series comprised 18 volumes from to 1841 to 1859; its second series 11 volumes from 1859 to 1870; its third series 25 volumes from 1870 to 1895; its fourth series was numbered both by series and by overall "complete series" publication (volume 1 of the fourth series was also volume 55 of the "complete series"). Later, volumes were only numbered based on the "complete series".
More recently, the PJ was an early adopter of online publication. In 2015 its printed version reverted to monthly publication while the online journal continued with daily updates. In 2021, the journal ceased publishing its print edition and became online only.
