= Royal Pharmaceutical Society of Great Britain =

British pharmaceutical organization

Coordinates: 51.4945°N 0.1192°W

The Royal Pharmaceutical Society of Great Britain (RPSGB) existed from its founding as the Pharmaceutical Society of Great Britain in 1841 until 2010. The word "Royal" was added to its name in 1988. It was the statutory regulatory and professional body for pharmacists and pharmacy technicians in England, Scotland and Wales. In September 2010, the regulatory powers of the Society were transferred to the newly formed General Pharmaceutical Council (GPhC). The RPSGB became the Royal Pharmaceutical Society (RPS) at that time and retained its professional leadership role; the "Great Britain" part of the name was dropped for day-to-day purposes.

== Statutory role ==
Before the establishment of the GPhC and the transfer of regulatory power, the primary objective of the RPSGB was to lead, regulate, develop and promote the pharmaceutical profession. All pharmacists in Great Britain had to be registered with the Society in order to practise, and the Society was unusual amongst healthcare regulators that it had its own inspectorate.

In latter years, in order to become a member of the Society an individual usually had to complete:

1. a MPharm or (if graduating before 2000) a BPharm or BSc (pharmacy) degree,
2. 52 weeks of pre-registration training and
3. pass a registration examination.

This gave them the right to use the post-nominal letters MRPharmS (Member of the Royal Pharmaceutical Society) and to practise as pharmacist in Great Britain. Fellowships (FRPharmS) were also awarded for pharmacists with long standing and outstanding commitment to the profession.

Since 2010, the register of pharmacists is now held by the GPhC and it is this body which now controls registration and fitness to practise. The Royal Pharmaceutical Society now provides Members with the post-nominals 'MRPharmS', Associate members receive 'ARPharmS', pharmaceutical Scientist members awarded 'SRPharmS', and Fellows denoted by the 'FRPharmS' post-nominals.

== History ==
The Pharmaceutical Society of Great Britain was founded on 15 April 1841 by William Allen, Jacob Bell, Daniel Hanbury, John Bell, Andrew Ure, James Marwood Hucklebridge, and other London chemists and druggists, at a meeting in the Crown and Anchor Tavern, Strand, London. William Allen was its first President, and the society quickly took premises at 17 Bloomsbury Square, London where a School of Pharmacy was established in which botany and materia medica were an important part of the students’ curriculum. In 1843, Queen Victoria granted the society its Royal Charter.

In 1879 Rose Coombes Minshull (1845–1905) and Isabella Skinner Clarke (1842–1926) became the first two women elected as full members of the society. In 1918 Margaret Elizabeth Buchanan became the first woman to be elected to the Council of the society, serving until 1926. Jean Irvine became the first female president of the society in 1947, which position she held until 1948.

In 1981, the RPSGB Diploma course in Veterinary pharmacy was initiated by professionals such as Michael Jepson and Steven Kayne, the former of whom led what was to become an institution until he retired in 2004. Sarah Cockbill then took the responsibility.

In 1988, Queen Elizabeth II agreed that the title "Royal" should be granted to the society.

The RPSGB operated a publishing company and the Royal Pharmaceutical Society Museum, both of which are now operated by the Royal Pharmaceutical Society.

== Arms ==
Coat of arms of Royal Pharmaceutical Society of Great Britain

Notes
Granted March 1844
Crest
On a wreath of the colours a mortar therein a pestle Or.
Escutcheon
Or on a cross Gules between a dove holding in the mouth an olive branch in the first quarter an aloe in the second a staff erect entwined by a serpent in the third and an alembic and receiver in the fourth all Proper a pair of scales of the first on a chief Azure a stag lodged also of the first.
Supporters
On the dexter side a figure intended to represent Ibn Sina habited in a dark red robe with a white under vest his shoes red around his waist a shawl also red fringed gold and upon his head a white turban in his right hand a staff gold entwined with a serpent Proper and on the sinister side a figure intended to represent Galen habited in a long white vest and loose robe his sandals red and holding in his right hand a steelyard Or.
Motto
Habenda Ratio Valetudinis

== See also ==
- Pharmaceutical industry in the United Kingdom
- List of pharmacy organisations in the United Kingdom
- List of schools of pharmacy in the United Kingdom
- British National Formulary
- British National Formulary for Children
- The Pharmacy Practice Research Trust
