= Royal College of Pharmacy =

UK professional organization

Coordinates: 51.4945°N 0.1192°W

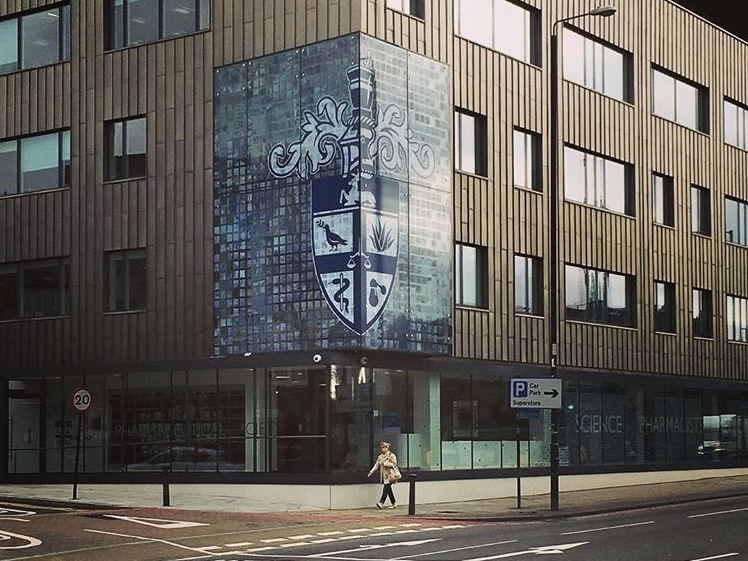
- Headquarters of the Royal College of Pharmacy at East Smithfield, London E1
- Abbreviation: RCPharm
- Predecessor: Royal Pharmaceutical Society (2010-2015); Royal Pharmaceutical Society of Great Britain (1841-2010)
- Established: September 2010; 16 years ago as the Royal Pharmaceutical Society
- Headquarters: East Smithfield; London, E1
- Location: Great Britain
- Chair of the Board of Trustees: Joe Irvin
- President: Tase Oputu
- Website: rcpharm.org

The Royal College of Pharmacy (RCPharm) is the body responsible for the leadership and support of the pharmacy profession (pharmacists) within England, Scotland, and Wales. It was created along with the General Pharmaceutical Council (GPhC) in September 2010 when the previous Royal Pharmaceutical Society of Great Britain was split so that representative and regulatory functions of the pharmacy profession could be separated. Membership in the college is not a prerequisite for engaging in practice as a pharmacist within the United Kingdom. Its predecessor the Pharmaceutical Society of Great Britain was founded on 15 April 1841. The organisation officially became the Royal College of Pharmacy on 15 April 2025

== History ==
The Royal College of Pharmacy was founded on 15 April 1841 as the Pharmaceutical Society of Great Britain, and headquartered at 17 Bloomsbury Square, London. Among its founding members were Jacob Bell and William Allen. The Northern British (Scottish) branch began the same year with nine founders including William Flockhart and John Duncan. From 1843, it had a royal charter that identified its chief objectives as the advancement of chemistry and pharmacy, the promotion of a system of education for its practitioners, and the legal protection of its members.

== Headquarters ==
The headquarters of the college are on East Smithfield Road, located near Whitechapel and St Katharine Docks in London, UK. From 1976 until 2015 the Royal Pharmaceutical Society's headquarters was in Lambeth on Lambeth High Street, London, UK.

== Membership ==
The college currently offers five categories of membership:

- Member: Full membership is available to anyone who has ever been registered as a pharmacist in Great Britain, whether or not currently registered with the GPhC.
- Fellow: Fellowship may be conferred by the college's Panel of Fellows on pharmacists who have been members of the college for at least 12 years and who have been deemed to have made outstanding original contributions.
- Associate: Associate membership is open to two categories of person: (a) those registered elsewhere in the world who have never been registered in Britain; (b) those who have a recognized degree in pharmacy but have not yet registered as a pharmacist in Britain, either because they are still undergoing their preregistration trainings or because they are not working in a field of practice that requires registration with the GPhC.
- Student: Student membership is available to anyone studying for a degree in pharmacy at any institute recognized by the Society (in Britain or overseas).
- Pharmaceutical Scientist: Pharmacist scientist membership is available to anyone with a degree (or equivalent) in a subject related to the pharmacy who has worked for at least two years in a recognized area of the pharmaceutical sciences.

== President of the College ==
=== Royal College of Pharmacy ===
- 2026 – present Tase Oputu

=== Royal Pharmaceutical Society (2010-2026) ===
- 2021 – 2026 Claire Anderson
- 2019 – 2021 Sandra Gidley
- 2017 – 2019 Ash Soni
- 2016 – 2017 Martin Astbury
- 2014 – 2016 Ash Soni

== Publishing ==
The Society operates two divisions of RCPharm Publishing:

- The Pharmaceutical Press publishes textbooks on a wide range of topics in pharmacy and pharmaceutical sciences including the British National Formulary, the British National Formulary for Children and Martindale: The complete drug reference.
- PJ Publications publishes the weekly professional journal The Pharmaceutical Journal and the monthly Clinical Pharmacist.

== Royal College of Pharmacy Museum ==
The Royal Pharmaceutical Society of Great Britain has had a museum collection since 1842, which continues to be managed by the college at its offices in East Smithfield. A historical collection was established in 1937 and expanded in the 1940s–1960s by Agnes Lothian. The exhibits cover all aspects of British pharmacy history, and include:

- Traditional dispensing equipment
- Drug storage containers
- Fine "Lambeth delftware" dating from the 17th and 18th centuries
- Proprietary (brand name) medicines dating from the 18th century to the present day
- Bronze mortars
- Medical caricatures
- A photo archive

Since 2002, the Royal College of Pharmacy has concentrated on developing the collection of historical and contemporary proprietary medicines.

The museum is open to visitors and admission is free. Guided tours are available if booked in advance. In 1983 the Royal Pharmaceutical Society of Great Britain donated over 10,000 historic specimens of materia medica, including crude drugs, herbarium sheets, and slides to the Kew Gardens. This material is now housed in the Economic Botany Collection (EBC) at Kew. The museum is a member of the London Museums of Health & Medicine.

== National Pharmacy Boards ==
The three boards provide professional leadership and advocacy support for pharmacy practice in England, Scotland and Wales respectively. They are currently chaired by Mahendra Patel, Catriona Sinclair and Liz Hallett respectively. The members of the boards are elected by the members of the society, but the members of the senate are not. The members of the senate are elected by members of the boards. The senate is senior to the boards in terms of policy making.

== See also ==
- Pharmaceutical industry in the United Kingdom
- List of pharmacy organizations in the United Kingdom
- List of schools of pharmacy in the United Kingdom
- British National Formulary
- The Pharmacy Practice Research Trust
