= Pharmacy in the United Kingdom =

Pharmacy in the United Kingdom has been an integral part of the National Health Service since it was established in 1948. Unlike the rest of the NHS, pharmacies are largely privately provided apart from those in hospitals, and even these are now often privately run.

== History ==
The trade in medicines in the United Kingdom was initially regulated by the Guild of Pepperers from 1180. In 1345 some members of the Guild of Pepperers founded the Worshipful Company of Grocers, which operated until 1617 and was responsible for assuring the quality of food and drugs. Their drugs business was replaced by the Worshipful Society of Apothecaries (one of the 110 Livery companies), which was founded in 1617, by permission of King James I, and its members were responsible for training apprentices for 7 years as the future new members.

Silvanus Bevan received 7 years of training and later co-founded Allen & Hanburys in 1715, now part of GlaxoSmithKline.

The Pharmaceutical Society of Great Britain was founded in 1841. The Pharmacy Act 1868 limited the sale of poisons and dangerous drugs to qualified pharmacists and druggists.

The advent of the NHS had an immediate beneficial effect on pharmaceutical companies. In 1960 there were proposals that private patients of general practitioners should be enabled to receive their drugs free on the health service, but they were not implemented.

The supply of drugs in the hospital service represented about one-tenth by value of the supply through retail pharmacies in 1965.

The Pharmaceutical Society of Great Britain was replaced by the Royal Pharmaceutical Society and the General Pharmaceutical Council in September 2010.

There was a reduction of more than a quarter in the number of pharmacies in the community between 1963 and 1979. According to the Pharmaceutical Services Negotiating Committee, at that time over 4000 pharmacies in England and Wales, dispensing fewer than 24,000 prescriptions per annum, were losing money on NHS services.

As measured in defined daily doses per 1000 inhabitants per day, the UK had a moderate rate of consumption of antibiotics in 2015, with a rate of 20.5, double that of the Netherlands but half that of Turkey.

The Health Survey for England 2016 showed that 48% of adults in the country had taken at least one prescribed medicine in the past week, and 24% had taken three or more; 10% were using antidepressants. A total of 1.1 billion prescriptions were dispensed in England in 2016 - 47% more than in 2006.

In 2022, the NHS reported the lowest number of pharmacies remaining open since 2015.

== Contract ==
NHS pharmacies are governed and paid for their NHS work under a standard contract, which was modified in 2019. This modification enabled pharmacy contractors to be paid for Medicines Use Reviews conducted by pharmacists for people with multiple long term prescriptions. There are also New Medicine Services, which are intended for patients who have started on long term medication, such as asthma treatment.

In 2016 the government announced that the budget for pharmacy would be reduced by £170 million nationally from 2017 (£113 million in England) - its “share” of the £22 billion in savings required across the NHS. Under the new contract there will be a payment of £1.33 per prescribed item dispensed, but the flat rate establishment payment (around £25,000 per pharmacy) set up in 2005 will be reduced by 40% and is to be abolished. There will be a Pharmacy Access Scheme with monthly payments for the 1427 pharmacies more than a mile away from the next pharmacy. There will be additional quality incentives for:

- Using NHS mail
- Producing an annual written patient safety report
- Training staff in safeguarding vulnerable people
- Using the Summary Care Record
- Achieving Healthy Living Pharmacy Level 1
- Asthma referrals
- Dementia Friends trained teams

In October 2017 the first payments to community pharmacies under the new quality payments scheme were made by NHS England. 90% of community pharmacies, 11,094 applied. 10,985 passed the qualifying criteria and received a payment. Future payments under the scheme are conditional on all pharmacy staff being able to send and receive email by the November review date. Pharmacists who have accessed Summary Care Records more than 100 times between two specific dates will also be eligible for a payment.

The revised contract for 2021 in England provided payment for blood pressure checks in high street pharmacies.

== Wales ==
The NHS in Wales has a separate pharmacy contract. In April 2017 Vaughan Gething announced that there were "no proposals to reduce investment in community pharmacy here in Wales" as was happening in England. By 2020 Welsh pharmacists will have access to patients’ summary care records in order to help deliver the Welsh common ailment service. By March 2018 all the Welsh pharmacies with access to the Choose Pharmacy IT system will be able to access the Welsh GP record.

== Scotland ==
The Royal Pharmaceutical Society in Scotland called for the creation of a single electronic patient health record which pharmacists could access in October 2017. They said their members needed to have the same access to records as a GP or hospital consultant in order to provide safe treatment to people in the community.

Pharmacy First was launched in 2017. This scheme permits pharmacists to treat uncomplicated urinary tract infections in women and impetigo in children without a doctor's prescription. It also increases access for patients with chronic obstructive pulmonary disease to medication-related advice and patient-centred medicine review.

The Scottish government's 'NHS Recovery Plan' launched in 2021 includes a hospital discharge and medicines reconciliation service run by community pharmacies.

== Northern Ireland ==
Antibiotic use is the highest in the UK, with prescribing rates in October 2017 being 30% higher than in England.

== Dispensing doctors ==
In rural areas GPs are permitted to dispense medication if there is not a pharmacy within a mile of the surgery. There are 1,290 dispensing practices across the UK serving 8.8 million patients in 2015. Many are members of the Dispensing Doctors' Association.

== England ==
NHS England is supporting initiatives to place pharmacists in GP practices in order to improve the management of medication for patients with long term conditions. About 420 million repeat prescriptions are generated in the UK each year — about 200 for each general practitioner each week. In the practice pharmacists can do more medicine use reviews. By April 2017 there were plans for 1350 practices in England to have access to clinical pharmacists. It is intended to have 1,500 pharmacists in general practice by 2020. NHS England's announced funding for 180 pharmacists and 60 technicians to work in care homes in March 2018. In April 2022 Health Education England announced funding for independent prescriber training to more than 3,000 pharmacists.

The cost of medicines in primary care in England in 2017/2018 was £8.87 billion, slightly less than the previous year.

The community pharmacy consultation service started from 29 October 2019. Patients can be referred to community pharmacies from NHS 111 for minor ailments, such as earache, nasal congestion and sore throat. They are reimbursed at £14 per consultation. More than 10,000 pharmacies signed up in the first three weeks but by March 2020 there had only been 60,000 consultations. It was reported that each one took about 20 minutes and there were inappropriate referrals.

The NHS Discharge Medicines Service started on 15 February 2021. Hospitals digitally refer patients to community pharmacies for advice on newly prescribed medicines or changed prescriptions when patients leave hospital.

In June 2022 there were 3,294 full-time equivalent pharmacists recorded as working in English primary care networks, an increase of about 700 in a year.

=== Costs ===
In 2018/2019 medicines prescribed in hospitals and in primary care cost £18.9 billion, 4% more than in the previous year. 54% of the cost was attributed to hospital prescribing. These sums are based on list prices, not necessarily the prices paid.

=== Hospital dispensing ===
Because of greater use of specialist medicines the cost, at list price, of prescribed medication in hospitals in England increased by 10.8% to £9.2 billion in 2017/2018 compared with the previous year. In 2010/2011 the hospital pharmacy bill was £4.2 billion. The biggest single cost was adalimumab at £494.5 million, the patent on which expired in December 2018. The actual costs paid may be less than the list prices.

=== Specialist Pharmacy Service ===
The Specialist Pharmacy Service provides advice primarily on high-cost, complex and innovative medicines and medicines-related services to NHS trusts and commissioners in England. It is responsible for medicines optimisation. It employs about 100 whole time equivalent senior pharmacists, pharmacy technicians and support staff. It provides advice about shortages of medication.

== Regulation ==
The services provided under contract to the NHS in community pharmacies and by community pharmacists are regulated in part by the NHS, under the provisions of the Pharmacy Act 1954 and The National Health Service (Pharmaceutical Services) Regulations, which prevent new pharmacies being opened without permission. This was done by the family health services authorities and then by primary care trusts. Now regulation is by NHS England and its Pharmaceutical Services Regulations committees.

Retail and retail-based hospital pharmacies in England, Scotland and Wales are theoretically regulated by the General Pharmaceutical Council (GPhC), whilst those in Northern Ireland are regulated by the Pharmaceutical Society of Northern Ireland (PSNI).

However, in 2018 it was revealed through a Freedom of Information request that whilst the General Pharmaceutical Council had issued 4,111 sanctions against individual registrants (pharmacists and pharmacy technicians), it had never issued any sanctions against pharmacy owners for a breach of its premises standards, since its inception in 2010. Regulation may be defined as the imposition of rules, backed by the use of penalties. Since penalties/sanctions/consequences are a key component of regulation, and the GPhC hasn't issued any, it could therefore be argued that the GPhC does not regulate pharmacy premises.

Non-retail hospital pharmacies are regulated as part of the hospital premises regulation by the Care Quality Commission.

== Local pharmaceutical committees ==
Local pharmaceutical committees were established in every area in 1948. Each is a representative committee of persons providing pharmaceutical services as defined in Section 44 of the National Health Service Act 1977. Each committee has about 12 members. There are now about 80 in England.

== Retail pharmacies ==
89% of the UK population live within a 20-minute walk of their local pharmacy. A majority of the population visit a pharmacy at least once every 28 days. In 2014 more than 1.1 billion prescription items were dispensed in England. This was 34.5 million more than in the previous 12 months and 378.4 million more than in 2004. The total net ingredient cost of prescribed items was £8.9 billion. 89.9% of all items dispensed in England were free of charge. In Scotland the total number of items dispensed in the community in 2014–2015 was 101.1 million with a net cost of £1.2bn.

Since at least 1979 there have been proposals that pharmacists should develop their role of giving advice to the public. NHS England announced a pilot scheme in July 2015 for GP practices in England to employ around 300 pharmacists to provide clinical care and relieve pressure on GPs. They will monitor patients with long-term conditions, create medicine plans and provide advice and expertise on day-to-day medicines issues.

In London pharmacies are used to deliver the Flu vaccination. In 2013/4 108,700 vaccinations were delivered by 1,089 pharmacies in the capital. Medicines Use Reviews in patients homes are delivered by pharmacists in Croydon.

In August 2015 it was announced that retail pharmacies would be given access to NHS patients Summary Care Records after a pilot of 140 pharmacies in Somerset, Northampton, North Derbyshire, Sheffield and West Yorkshire, demonstrated “significant benefits.” Pharmacists have to ask for a patient's permission to view their record.

The Association of Independent Multiple Pharmacies is a trade association, based in Doncaster. Leyla Hannbeck is the chief executive.

According to Community Pharmacy England pharmacies in England delivered £31.6 billion worth of net benefits to the NHS, public sector, patients and wider society in 2023/24. This was by managing drug shortages and prescription errors, advising on minor ailments and supporting medicines optimisation, and providing some public health services - not including the dispensing of prescriptions.

== See also ==
- Drug policy of the United Kingdom
- Prescription charges
