= List of pharmacy organisations in the United Kingdom =

This article is a list of pharmacy organisations in the United Kingdom.

== List ==
=== A ===
- Association of the British Pharmaceutical Industry (ABPI)

=== B ===
- Bandolier
- British National Formulary (BNF)
- British National Formulary for Children (BNFC)
- British Pharmacopoeia Commission (BPC)

=== C ===
- Cochrane Collaboration
- Commission on Human Medicines

=== D ===
- Department of Health and Social Care (DHSC)
- DrugScope

=== G ===
- General Pharmaceutical Council (GPhC)

=== M ===
- Medicines and Healthcare products Regulatory Agency (MHRA)

=== N ===
- National Pharmacy Association (NPA)
- National Institute for Health and Care Excellence (NICE)
- National Patient Safety Agency (NPSA)
- NHS Confederation

=== P ===
- Pharmaceutical Services Negotiating Committee (PSNC)
- Pharmaceutical Society of Northern Ireland
- Pharmacists' Defence Association (PDA)

=== R ===
- Royal Pharmaceutical Society (RPS)

=== S ===
- Scottish Medicines Consortium (SMC)

=== U ===
- UK Clinical Pharmacy Association

=== V ===
- Veterinary Medicines Directorate, an Executive Agency of the Department for Environment, Food and Rural Affairs (Defra)

=== W ===
- Worshipful Society of Apothecaries of London

== See also ==
- History of pharmacy
- List of schools of pharmacy in the United Kingdom
- List of pharmaceutical manufacturers in the United Kingdom
- List of pharmacy associations
