= General Pharmaceutical Council =

British regulatory body for pharmacists

The General Pharmaceutical Council (GPhC) is the body responsible for the independent regulation of the pharmacists, pharmacy technicians and pharmacy premises within England, Scotland and Wales. It was created in September 2010 when the functions of the body then responsible for regulation and professional representation, the Royal Pharmaceutical Society of Great Britain, were split. At that time, the Royal Pharmaceutical Society of Great Britain began trading as the Royal Pharmaceutical Society and adopted only the representative functions of the pharmacy profession, whilst the GPhC assumed the regulatory functions.

== Statutory ==
The Health and Social Care Act 2008 and the subsequent Pharmacy Order 2010 allowed for regulatory functions of the RPSGB to be transferred to the new pharmacy regulator, the GPhC. The GPhC is therefore responsible for the update and maintenance of the registers of pharmacists, pharmacy technicians, pharmacy premises and pharmacy training premises. These registers can be accessed electronically by any member of the public online at the GPhC's website.

In addition the GPhC states that the Health and Social Care Act 2008 has sufficient provisions to allow for the transfer of regulatory powers from the Pharmaceutical Society of Northern Ireland to the GPhC in the future, subject to approval of Northern Ireland Ministers.

The principal functions of the GPhC, as stated within Pharmacy Order 2010 are:

- to establish and maintain a register of pharmacists, pharmacy technicians and premises at which a retail pharmacy business is;
- to set and promote standards for the safe and effective practice of pharmacy at registered pharmacies;
- to set standards to which registrants must demonstrate that their fitness to practise is not impaired;
- to promote the safe and effective practice of pharmacy by registrants;
- to set standards and requirements in respect of the education, training, acquisition of experience and continuing professional development that it is necessary for pharmacists and pharmacy technicians to achieve to be entered in the Register or to receive an annotation in the Register and to maintain competence; and
- to ensure the continued fitness to practise of registrants.

Furthermore, under statute, the GPhC must have the following committees;

- Investigating Committee (considers allegations that a registrant's fitness to practise is impaired, and can refer to the Fitness to Practise Committee for a full inquiry);
- Fitness to Practise Committee (makes decisions in cases where a registrant's fitness to practise may be impaired, for reasons concerning their conduct, professional performance or health); and
- Appeals Committee (considers appeals of decisions relating to applications for registration and registration status).

The Pharmacy Order 2010 requires not only that the GPhC sets acceptable standards of continuing professional development (CPD), but that it ensures that all registrants meet those required standards, and that there are processes in place for various remedial measures, including removal of a registrant from the register if they either fail to meet these standards, or make a false statement in relation to their CPD.

== Governance ==
The GPhC is governed by a fourteen-member GPhC Council, with equal numbers of lay and registrant members, which is operationally independent from the government, the professionals it regulates and any other interest groups. The GPhC states that to reinforce this independence, all members of the GPhC Council, including the chair, are appointed by the Privy Council, rather than elected.

The first chair of the GPhC Council was Bob Nicholls CBE, a lay member with extensive experience in the National Health Service, who has previously been a lay member of the General Medical Council, among other regulatory appointments. Bob Nicholls was replaced in 2014 by Nigel Clarke, a lay member with experience of the General Osteopathic Council and chairing the Future Professional Body for Pharmacy and then the Transitional Committee, which created the prospectus for the reformed Royal Pharmaceutical Society In February 2022, Gisela Abbam was appointed as chair, replacing Nigel Clarke

=== Interests of Members of the Governing Council ===
Nigel Clarke was the GPhC Chairman from 2014–2022. He was previously a partner of GJW, the firm Boots used for its public affairs and lobbying, between 1993 and 1998 and onwards. He was part of Prime Minister David Cameron's business trade delegation to India in 2013, the year before his appointment to the healthcare regulator in 2014. Clarke was also the business partner of Digby Emson, a former Boots superintendent, who was the chairman of the GPhC's audit and risk committee (circa 2017-2020) and also a council member (2014-2020).

The chairman of the GPhC's audit and risk committee, Digby Emson was (from 2008 onwards, and ongoing as at July 2022) the chairman of Buttercups, an organisation that sells training courses for pre-registration pharmacists, and training courses and apprenticeships for pharmacy technicians and pharmacy support staff. The GPhC's regulatory duties include setting standards for and accrediting the education and training of pharmacists and pharmacy technicians. The GPhC also sets requirements for the education and training of pharmacy support staff. As such, there was an apparent conflict of interests in holding this role.

== Regulation of pharmacy premises ==
The GPhC is responsible for regulating pharmacy premises across Great Britain. It carries out inspections of pharmacy premises.

The GPhC has a legal objective, under Article 6 of The Pharmacy Order 2010, to promote and maintain proper standards in relation to the carrying on of retail pharmacy businesses at registered pharmacies.

Article 7 of the Pharmacy Order 2010 requires the GPhC to set standards that are to be met in connection with the carrying on of a retail pharmacy business at or from a registered pharmacy by the pharmacy owner. Article 7 provides examples of the standards the GPhC may set, but does not limit the contents of those standards.

Whilst the GPhC regulates registered pharmacies, it also regulates the pharmacists and pharmacy technicians who work in the environment and conditions therein. It may take action against pharmacists and pharmacy technicians following allegations regarding their fitness to practise. If a person's conduct was attributable wholly or in part to shortcomings in the working environment or conditions at the registered pharmacy, it is not clear to what extent the GPhC would take this into account, or to what extent it would take further action in respect of the premises itself. If the GPhC were to find that the registered premises had not met standards, questions would arise as any shortcomings on the GPhC's part of regulating the environment and conditions at that pharmacy. The GPhC has an ostensible conflict of interests in regulating individuals and premises at the same time. The GPhC may be inclined to set less stringent standards for registered pharmacies, or to find that those standards have been met, or not to inspect the pharmacies regularly or rigorously, to avoid pharmacists or pharmacy technicians being able to argue that their conduct was in whole or in part attributable to poor standards at the pharmacy, or a failure on the part of the GPhC.

=== Failures in premises regulation ===
A Freedom of Information request submitted by The Pharmacists’ Defence Association in late 2017 found that although the GPhC had issued over 3,500 sanctions against individual registrants (which number had risen to 4,111 by mid 2018), i.e. pharmacists and pharmacy technicians, it had never issued a single sanction for a breach of pharmacy premises standards since its inception in 2010. This was in the context of 995 occasions in the two financial years preceding the FOI request in which the GPhC had identified serious issues at registered pharmacies that it wanted rectifying, where its standards for registered pharmacies had not been met.

The Freedom of Information request also revealed that the GPhC had never:

- Fulfilled its legal obligation to set Standards for Registered Pharmacies in rules
- Issued an improvement notice to a pharmacy owner under its powers
- Brought a fitness to practise case against a registrant for a failure to comply with its Standards for Registered Pharmacies
- Established a category in its fitness to practise database for recording allegations which relate to compliance with its Standards for Registered Pharmacies
- Disqualified, removed, or sought to disqualify or remove, a pharmacy from the register (article 14 of the Pharmacy Order 2010 – failure to comply with an improvement notice, which could lead to a fine)
- Sought or obtained a conviction against a pharmacy owner under articles 12 or 14 of the Pharmacy Order 2010 (for failing to assist or obstructing an inspector, providing false or misleading information to an inspector, failing to produce a document or record to an inspector when requested to do so or failure to comply with an improvement notice)

A further Freedom of Information request submitted by The Pharmacists’ Defence Association in mid-2018 revealed that whilst carrying out routine inspections of pharmacies, the GPhC had issued 667 ‘poor’ ratings between 1 November 2013 and 24 June 2018. A poor rating signified that:

- The GPhC has "major concerns about patient safety… that require immediate improvement"
- The pharmacy is "likely to present an unacceptable risk of harm to patients and the public. This means the risk is likely to occur and/or will have moderate to high impact."

The PDA juxtaposed this finding against the finding from its earlier FOI request that the GPhC had never issued any sanctions for breaches of its premises standards.

The GPhC keeps a "bank of acceptable tolerances" to help it decide what pharmacy inspection rating to give, when it inspects a registered pharmacy. The GPhC refused to disclose the details of the bank of acceptable tolerances, saying that it would prejudice the exercise of its functions.

The GPhC's approach to pharmacy premises regulation changed in 2023 when it announced that it would conduct fewer routine inspections of pharmacies. The GPhC stated that it was doing so "to ensure we support pharmacies during these challenging times to provide safe and effective care to patients". The GPhC has no statutory role in "supporting pharmacies" and would be less likely to detect problems if not conducting inspections; whether or not "challenging times" exist is not, according to the GPhC's statutory role set out in The Pharmacy Order 2010, a matter to which the GPhC should or must have regard. According to the GPhC's statement, the cessation of inspections would improve the provision of safe and effective care - implying that its conduct of inspections would in fact reduce the safe and effective care provided to patients.

=== Relationships with pharmacy chains ===
As part of its role as a premises regulator, the GPhC appoints strategic relationship managers to chain pharmacies with more than 50 pharmacies. The GPhC has not provided any information about this role in the public domain, such as how it contributes to pharmacy inspection results, or why it treats chain pharmacies differently. It appears that some of the inspection outcome is predetermined as a desktop exercise by the GPhC in conjunction with the head office of the chain pharmacy, before the GPhC visits the pharmacy. This approach would not account for whether the GPhC's requirements were being met in practice at the pharmacy. An internal document from a large pharmacy chain stated:

"The GPhC is mindful that community pharmacy multiples are different from independent pharmacies in that their policies and procedures are developed centrally and much of the decision-making cannot be made at local level. Therefore, the GPhC has appointed a designated Strategic relationship manager to all multiples with more than 50 pharmacies. The purpose of this is to achieve improved consistency, with the strategic relationship manager holding three formalised structured meetings with the Superintendent Pharmacist and his/her team each year to review corporate documents and processes. This will facilitate other inspectors’ reviews of individual premises to confirm ongoing compliance with company policies and procedures."

=== Powers to regulate corporate bodies ===
The GPhC listed its powers to regulate corporate bodies, effected through its committees, thus:

- The committee has the power under Section 80 of the Medicines Act 1968 to deal with ‘disqualification allegations’ made against a corporate body that carries on a retail pharmacy business. The committee may direct that:
  - a corporate body should be disqualified for the purposes of Part IV of the Medicines Act 1968
  - a ‘representative’ of the corporate body should be disqualified as being a representative for the purposes of Part IV of the Medicines Act 1968
  - the registrar should remove from the register of premises some or all of the premises at which the corporate body carries on retail pharmacy
  - the registrar should remove from the register of premises, for a limited time, some or all of the premises at which the corporate body carries on retail pharmacy

=== Fitness for purpose of the regulation of large corporate chain pharmacies ===
In September 2022, the Professional Standards Authority launched a report in Parliament on improving patient safety. Noting the GPhC’s powers to regulate pharmacy owners and pharmacy premises, the PSA stated:

“The GPhC has more modern legislation, established under the Pharmacy Order 2010… the GPhC can issue improvement notices or conditions, or ultimately, disqualify a pharmacy owner and remove all their premises from the register.”

It also observed that

“The GPhC’s inspection and enforcement powers are unique among the healthcare professional regulators. They give it significant scope to influence a number of areas including governance, risk management and safe staffing.”

The PSA then noted that regulation by the GPhC may not be fit for purpose:

“We are seeing large corporate chains accused of ‘hard sell’ tactics, and other questionable practices, that seem to prioritise profit over the best interests of both patients and registrants. However, the regulation of ‘high street’ providers of healthcare is complex and piecemeal, and may not be fit for purpose.”

=== Failure to regulate temporary closures of large corporate chain pharmacies ===
In 2018, a Freedom of Information request revealed that 5,878 temporary pharmacy closures occurred in England in a 12-month period in 2016-17. In November 2022, a Freedom of Information request revealed that 20,924 temporary closures occurred in England in a 12-month period between Oct 2021 and Sep 2022. 86% (17,894) of the 20,924 closures were reported by six of the largest pharmacy chains (Lloyds, Boots, Well, Tesco, Rowlands and ASDA) despite these chains accounting for only 36% (4,134) of the 11,600 registered pharmacies in England.

In September 2022, the GPhC issued a statement, saying that pharmacy closures “may raise concerns for patient safety, particularly if people cannot access the medicines and other pharmacy services many rely on”. However, it claimed that “as a regulator” it does not have a role in authorising when pharmacies open, investigating pharmacy closures, or monitoring opening hours. It encouraged the public and pharmacists to report concerns to the NHS. It also said that closures could be reported to the GPhC, but in the context of its statement that it doesn’t have a role in investigating them, it did not explain what purpose this would serve.

The GPhC stated that some closures may be appropriate if necessary in the interests of patient safety. However, many closures are avoidable; they may occur, for example, due to a failure by a pharmacy owner to ensure enough staff are available to open the pharmacy. Between 2010 and 2021 there was a substantial increase in the number of pharmacists relative to the number of registered pharmacies. This holds true when the increased number of pharmacists working in primary care, is taken into account.

==== GPhC’s legal powers to set standards relating to pharmacy closures ====
The GPhC is required by Article 7 of the Pharmacy Order 2010 to set standards that are to be met in connection with the carrying on of a retail pharmacy business at or from a registered pharmacy by the pharmacy owner. The non-exhaustive list of examples of the standards that the GPhC may set, provided in Article 7(3), includes those which may relate to pharmacy closures. The standards can relate, for example, to:

- pharmacy governance arrangements, including arrangements for managing and monitoring the safe and effective provision of pharmacy services
- the working environment at and the condition of registered pharmacies
- the patient and public experience of pharmacy services provided
- arrangements for ensuring staff of the retail pharmacy business are properly held accountable for the health, safety and well-being of patients to whom pharmacy services are provided.

==== GPhC Standards for Registered Pharmacies ====
The GPhC’s current Standards for Registered Pharmacies, in the table below, are relevant to pharmacy closures. Whilst these are the GPhC's current standards, it is not prevented from setting further or alternative standards in order to meet its objectives.

GPhC premises standard number	Standard	How the standard may apply to pharmacy closures
1.1	The risks associated with providing pharmacy services are identified and managed.	The risks associated with providing pharmacy services may not be being identified and managed effectively if the pharmacy is closed when the public would reasonably expect it to be open.
1.3	Pharmacy services are provided by staff with clearly defined roles and clear lines of accountability.	If a pharmacy is closed at a time when the public would reasonably expect it to be open, contrary to the public's expectations, the pharmacy services are not being provided at all. One or more members of the pharmacy staff would have accountability for ensuring pharmacy service provision at the expected time.
1.8	Children and vulnerable adults are safeguarded.	Children and vulnerable adults are not being safeguarded when the pharmacy is closed unnecessarily, when they would reasonably expect it to be open.
2.1	There are enough staff, suitably qualified and skilled, for the safe and effective provision of the pharmacy services provided.	The closure may have occurred because there are not enough staff. The pharmacy services are not being provided safely and effectively if the pharmacy is closed at a time when the public would reasonably expect it to be open, and the reason for the closure is an avoidable failure to ensure enough staff.
2.4	There is a culture of openness, honesty and learning.	Closures which are repeated at the same pharmacies may indicate that the situation is not being learned from adequately.
2.6	Incentives or targets do not compromise the health, safety or wellbeing of patients and the public, or the professional judgement of staff.	Closures may be effected to meet profit targets, and may compromise the health, safety and wellbeing of patients and the public.
4.1	The pharmacy services provided are accessible to patients and the public.	The services are not provided, and are not accessible to the public, if the pharmacy is closed when the public would reasonably expect it to be open. This standard could not properly be interpreted as applying only when a pharmacy service is provided, because when such a service is being provided, it is accessible; such an interpretation would render the standard a nullity.
4.2	Pharmacy services are managed and delivered safely and effectively.	This may not be the case when there are closures.

== Regulation of Pharmacists and Pharmacy Technicians ==
The GPhC is responsible for the regulation of 61,137 pharmacists and 24,928 pharmacy technicians as at July 2022.

=== Confidence in the GPhC ===
In 2016/17, the Pharmacists' Defence Association conducted a survey of its members, in which one of the questions asked was "Do you have confidence that the working environments in the pharmacy, set by your main employer, are satisfactorily regulated by the GPhC/PSNI in such a way as to support the safe provision of pharmacy services to patients?". Of the 1,492 responses received, 72.7% said "No" or that they were unsure.

In 2022, during the parliamentary process of examining the Pharmacy (Responsible Pharmacists, Superintendent Pharmacists etc.) Order 2022, comments from the Secondary Legislation Scrutiny Committee were noted which related to professional distrust in the GPhC. Baroness Brinton noted of the committee's report:

"It says in paragraph 14:

"several proposals were not popular with respondents to the consultation exercise on the grounds that they may reduce patient safety, particularly provisions allowing Superintendent Pharmacists to cover more than one firm and Responsible Pharmacists to cover more than one pharmacy or to operate remotely. We also note significant levels of distrust from the profession that the regulator, the General Pharmaceutical Council … would be able to set standards and rules appropriately."

Worryingly, the committee goes on to say:

“We found the response of the Department of Health and Social Care … to these concerns, as set out in the Explanatory Memorandum, unconvincing.”

=== Professional Standards Authority v General Pharmaceutical Council and R2 ===
Professional Standards Authority v General Pharmaceutical Council and R2 [2024] EWHC 3005 (Admin) is a judgment of the High Court relating to the GPhC's handling of fitness to practice concerns. Concerns were raised about two brothers, referred to by the court as R1 and R2, accused of falsifying prescriptions to obtain high value drugs and export them to EU member states before Brexit. The GPhC made a series of procedural errors in the handling of R2's case, including communicating to R2 that the case had been closed when it had not, a delay of 11 months in informing R2 of this error, wrongly referring the case to the Fitness to Practise Committee (contrary to its own internal guidance), and failing to notify R2 of the referral for 6 months, where the requisite timescale to do so was 10 days. The court held that there were "serious irregularities and failings" in the GPhC's handling of R2's case, that the GPhC was "wholly to blame for the grossly incompetent errors made" and that in other respects the GPhC handled R2's case with "gross incompetence and unfairness". It ordered the GPhC to undertake the whole process again.

== Human rights legal challenge to its professional standards ==
In 2017, the GPhC renamed its “Standards of Conduct, Ethics and Performance”, which set standards for pharmacists registered with the GPhC, to “Standards for Pharmacy Professionals”. At the same time, it changed the standards, and set out for the first time expressly that “The standards need to be met at all times, not only during working hours.” Two pharmacists, Pitt and Tyas, who were employees of the Pharmacists’ Defence Association, initiated judicial review proceedings on the basis that – they alleged – the new standards would infringe their human rights set out in Articles 8, 10 and 11 of the European Convention on Human Rights, as given effect in UK law through Sch. 1 to the Human Rights Act 1998. The challenge was ultimately not successful, but the judgement has been called into question.

The GPhC's social media guidance (“Demonstrating Professionalism Online”) – which asks pharmacists not to get involved in “negative, unconstructive discussions”, has not as yet been subject to legal challenge on the grounds of human rights. However, action taken against a pharmacist on the basis that he/she was involved in a negative and/or unconstructive discussion has the potential to engage human rights issues in relation to freedom of expression.

== Potential cheating/collusion/plagiarism on pharmacy technician training courses ==
In July 2018, The Pharmacists’ Defence Association reported on “potential cheating, collusion or plagiarism among trainee pharmacy technicians”. It stated that:

“A small number of online distance learning courses are undertaken by many trainee pharmacy technicians in the UK… since 2011, an extensive set of responses to assessment questions appears to have been developing, all of which are publicly visible and indexed on online search engines. This means that trainee pharmacy technicians completing the distance learning courses can find answers to these questions and could potentially plagiarise them word-for-word to help them pass their assessments, without having conducted their own research or developing their own understanding. Some of the suggested responses to exam questions indicate what grading was obtained for that response. Communication also appears to occur through private messaging. As at 22 March 2018, the threads identified had been viewed a combined total 61,483 times... GPhC-commissioned research, published in 2014, included comments relating to the potential for cheating, collusion and plagiarism on pharmacy technicians’ initial education and training courses... It is unclear what action the GPhC has taken on this matter since that time.”

There are no public reports of the GPhC taking any action to investigate following the PDA report.

Buttercups Training, which provided pharmacy technician training courses and whose chairman at the time was also the Chairman of the GPhC's Audit and Risk Committee, responded to the PDA report, saying among other things that “cheating is a part of the human condition”. However, it said it has robust systems to detect cheating and will respond swiftly and decisively where it is discovered on its own courses.

== Continuing Professional Development (CPD) (improperly called "revalidation") ==
Pharmacists and pharmacy technicians are required to provide evidence annually to the GPhC that they have maintained their fitness to practise. Prior to 30 March 2018, the process of ongoing learning – evidence of which had had to be provided to the GPhC since its inception in 2010 – was referred to as "Continuing Professional Development" (CPD).

=== Development of the framework ===
For three years, from 2014 to 2017, the GPhC developed proposals to change the CPD requirements placed upon pharmacists and pharmacy technicians, under a "Continuing Fitness to Practise" “CFtP” programme. The GPhC decided to change the name from CFtP to “revalidation” around three weeks before the launch of the public "consultation" on the proposed change, whilst the Head of Continuing Fitness to Practise was on leave, and after its CFtP advisory group - which had advised the GPhC during the programme - had been disbanded. The Head of CFtP, on learning of the change on return from leave, implored the GPhC to reconsider, and revert to calling the process "CFtP". During the meetings of the CFtP advisory group, the Head of CFtP at the GPhC spoke in favour of calling the process, simply, “CPD”.

=== Requirements ===
The requirements under the framework include submitting four CPD records each year (two of which must be planned); a reflective account, in which the individual considers his/her own practice; and a peer discussion. This does not amount to revalidation because it does not involve a formal assessment by another person that the registrant is meeting regulatory requirements, in order for the registrant to re-register. Such formal assessment is a feature of the GMC and NMC revalidation programmes, which were, at the time the GPhC introduced the change, the only two revalidation programmes among healthcare regulators regulated by the Professional Standards Authority.

=== Definition of revalidation ===
Formal assessment by another person was the basis of revalidation as recommended in the Shipman report (arising from The Shipman Inquiry, in which actual revalidation has many of its roots. The Shipman report was a landmark report in UK healthcare into a doctor who is estimated to have murdered at least 215 of his patients over a period of 24 years. The distinction between revalidation and CFtP is therefore an important one, to be recognised by healthcare regulators who wish to demonstrate they have genuinely learned from past events, including The Shipman Inquiry. The GPhC’s “revalidation” framework not meet the definitions of revalidation from the Professional Standards Authority, the Department of Health and Social Care, and others.

That the CPD/CFtP process did not amount to revalidation was repeatedly conveyed by the GPhC to the CFtP advisory group. It was also noted in the "CFtP Interim Evaluation Report", produced for the GPhC by Solutions for Public Health in the course of the GPhC's "Continuing Fitness to Practise" programme, that the GPhC's framework did not amount to revalidation. This explanation was removed and was not present in the final report published in the public domain by the GPhC. The GPhC did not advise of the significance of the change in name, in its public consultation. The above details were not included in the consultation documents and were not shared by the GPhC with the wider audience at its engagement event in London on 16 May 2017.

=== Likelihood of a registrant’s records being checked ===
The GPhC checks the records of 1 in 40 registrants each year. This means that a registrant could go through his/her career of many years without having his/her records checked by the GPhC or anyone else. If the records are deemed unsatisfactory, he/she could be given two further chances to put this right. Having a framework which is capable of robust early detection of deficient practice was a key expectation of the GMC’s revalidation framework following the Shipman Inquiry.

=== Claims regarding the naming of the process ===
The GPhC asserted that the change from CFtP to "revalidation" was made due to concerns over the negative connotations associated with the term “fitness to practise”. This reasoning is implausible and likely dishonest (a behaviour which the GPhC says damages public confidence and undermines integrity). The GPhC has not renamed its Fitness to Practise Committee or Fitness to Practise declarations; ceased requiring registrants to complete a “fitness to practise” declaration annually; or taken any other discernible steps to avoid the use of this term. The term "fitness to practise" is used repeatedly on its website and in its policies. It is also a term referred to extensively in The Pharmacy Order 2010, the act of legislation which gives the GPhC its powers. It is also used repeatedly in the GPhC’s “revalidation framework” document.

The framework does not meet the GPhC’s own definition of revalidation. At a meeting in November 2013, the GPhC’s governing council explored a means of implementing a framework for assuring continuing fitness to practise. The meeting papers stated: “The terms ‘revalidation’ and ‘continuing fitness to practise’ are subtly different. In the GPhC’s view ‘revalidation’ implies a fixed point assessment whereas ‘continuing fitness to practise’ suggests a review of practice viewed on a continuum. The latter better describes the thinking outlined in this proposal, so that term will be used from now on.”

In 2014, a page was created on the GPhC’s website explaining why it was looking to implement a CFtP framework and not revalidation. On that page, under the heading “What happened to revalidation?”, it stated: “We have been working on the introduction of new arrangements for assuring continuing fitness to practise for some time, and initially this was called ‘revalidation’. We have decided not to use the word ‘revalidation’ anymore because it has a very specific meaning relating to a particular method of assuring continuing fitness to practise.” As at 5 February 2017, the GPhC had changed this to “We have been working on the introduction of new arrangements for further assuring standards for safe and effective pharmacy practice for some time, and initially this was called ‘revalidation’. We have decided not to use this term anymore because it was not well understood.” The webpage has since been removed from the GPhC’s website.

In the version of the evaluation report of the CFtP pilot published on the GPhC’s website in February 2017, it explains that the GMC and NMC revalidation models include a fixed-point assessment of the registrant’s fitness to practise. The report confirms the GPhC’s continued commitment at that point not to develop a revalidation model (which it had earlier said implies a fixed-point assessment): “The GPhC’s direction of travel is to move away from a process of a fixed point assessment for assurance… Given the PSA guidance on the CFtP model being proportionate to risk, this makes sense.”

That the framework does not amount to revalidation was acknowledged by the GPhC and other pharmacy stakeholders at a CFtP advisory group meeting on 11 October 2017. The advisory group requested that the GPhC’s governing council be asked, at its meeting the following day, to change the name of the framework from “revalidation” to an alternative which accurately reflects its nature. The advisory group was subsequently informed by email on 1 November 2017 that the council had decided to retain the name “because of its relative ease of understanding and they felt we needed to do more to explain the type of assurance that it provided to the public”. There is no record in the minutes of the council’s meeting of 12 October 2017 of this being discussed, though revalidation was discussed.

=== Effects of improperly calling its process “revalidation” ===
Calling the process, inaccurately, "revalidation", could have at least the following effects each time that the term is used, including through its continued use:

- Creating the impression that the GPhC's approach to regulation, as a whole, is more robust than it is.
- The GPhC misleads the public and others as to the nature of the process, and that the assurance in respect of public protection is greater than the process actually affords.
- In order to register, registrants must submit a false declaration each year, that they have undertaken revalidation, when in fact they have not.
- In using the term, pharmacy organisations and registrants join the GPhC, unwittingly or otherwise, in misleading the public and others as to the nature of the process.
- It may de-professionalize the pharmacy profession. If it is accepted that pharmacists can “revalidate” annually by creating six records with a 1 in 40 chance that they will be reviewed by the GPhC, then it can be argued that little public safety assurance is required in the regulation of pharmacists. As such, pharmacists pose little risk to the public, and the role is straightforward.
- Reduced confidence in revalidation frameworks provided by other regulators, if public perception of the meaning of revalidation alters to accommodate the lower standards adopted by the GPhC relative to other regulators.
- Suggest that the regulatory practise of pharmacists and pharmacy technicians is more advanced than it is in reality, misleading the public as to the confidence it can have in one or both groups. This may then be used to advance government policy objectives in respect of the use of the groups (or one group instead of another) in the health service.

== Pharmacist Registration Assessment ==
The GPhC Exam or GPhC Registration Assessment exam was set by the Royal Pharmaceutical Society of Great Britain, but since September 2010 has been the responsibility of the GPhC. The examination takes place on two occasions each year: the summer (the last Friday in June) and the autumn (the last Friday in September). Candidates are required to pass it in order to register with the GPhC and to be able to practise as pharmacists. It is taken by those who have completed their university studies and gained an MPharm degree, and completed a year of pre-registration foundation training.

In explaining the importance of the pharmacist registration assessment, the GPhC said:

"It is a national standard... if you talk to the public and you talk to patients, that is something that genuinely matters - that they can be reassured that all of the good work that goes on in schools of pharmacy and in pre-registration training has at the end a moment where we can say, as a national regulator, that a standard has been met. There are very few objective ways of doing it, but an examination is one of those... There has been an exam since 1993... we've thought about it long and hard and we've concluded that an examination as a national standard to demonstrate to the public that a standard has been met is really quite crucial... It is fair. Everybody gets the same one. You cannot say that your examination was harder than somebody else's, or easier, and that's again something that is genuinely reassuring. There are so many assessments over the course of four years in a school of pharmacy, it's quite hard to compare them. We're comfortable with the fact that the learning outcomes are met across the nations but it's very hard to say that at any one moment - because it's not true - that everybody had the same assessment, and this is the only moment currently where that is the case. That's an important reassurance for the public. The other signoff in pre-registration is a tutor signoff. And those of you who know anything about assessment will know that a one-to-one signoff is one of the less reliable forms of assessment. It's quite rich because there's a lot of interaction involved, you know the person well, but that in itself can cloud your judgement, so on the scale of reliability and validity, it might be quite valid but it's not necessarily that reliable. That's why as a general principle you never use one kind of assessment in a high-stakes year of training, so that's another reason it's there. And there is another aspect that we cannot ignore. Despite the best efforts of schools of pharmacy and pre-registration training, there are individuals who get to the exam and fail it dismally... who get zero in calculations, for example, or 30% or 20%. So clearly there is a need for that final backstop for those individuals who for whatever reason have made it that far. So there is a genuine public protection reason for having the exam, so that's our rationale for keeping it."

=== Potential collusion / failure of integrity of the pharmacist registration exam in March 2021 ===
Provisional registration as a pharmacist was introduced as a temporary measure in response to the COVID-19 pandemic. It was secured through an application process, and was open to those who had completed their University degree in pharmacy, and pre-registration training year. Only those who intended to practise as "provisionally registered pharmacists" needed to apply. Those who were successful in the application could join the register as "provisionally registered pharmacists" from 1 August 2020. They were not required to sit a registration exam to verify their competence or fitness to practise.

2,600 candidates, including many such "provisionally registered pharmacists", sat exams on either the 17th or 18th of March 2021, in order to register with the GPhC as pharmacists. Following the assessment on 18 March, there were reports on social media that many questions on 18 March sitting were the same as those which appeared on the 17th. Some candidates who sat the exam on the 17th had reportedly shared details of the questions on the exam with some of those sitting it on the 18th, in chat groups used by candidates. The reports from candidates included that at least 30 questions were similar, "both papers were nearly identical", the "majority" of questions were the same and "at least 50% of the questions came back". The candidates who made these assertions can only have done so as a result of being told the answers by other candidates who sat the exam the previous day. The GPhC responded, stating "There have been some concerns raised by candidates that the papers for each sitting were the same or very similar, and that this could have an impact on which candidates pass the assessment." It stated that "the majority of questions were different, with some questions appearing similar but having appropriately different answers" but acknowledged that "a number of questions were the same". The GPhC did not state that it would conduct any investigation into the reports, or that it would discount the questions that were repeated on the 18th. It appears that all candidates who sat the exam on the 18th were eligible to register as pharmacists, without any investigation or corrective action taking place.

A Freedom of Information request was submitted for the number of questions which appeared on both exams. The GPhC initially refused to provide the information. However, following a decision from the Information Commissioner's Office relating to the request, it stated: "We held a computer-based registration assessment on the 17 March 2021 and again on the 18 March 2021. On each day, there was a 40-question part 1 paper and a 120-question part 2 paper and the papers were different. In total, 14 identical questions were used in both part 1 papers and 62 identical questions were used in both part 2 papers."

=== July 2021 pharmacist registration assessment ===
In the pharmacist registration assessment of July 2021, 2,625 candidates sat the assessment for the first time, of which 259 were provisionally registered pharmacists. 2,189 candidates passed it, of which 172 were provisionally registered pharmacists. The results were announced on 9 September 2021. Therefore, 66.4% of those who were provisionally registered pharmacists, and 85.2% of those who were not, passed the exam. The assessment in July was the second opportunity for provisionally registered pharmacists to sit the assessment, the first opportunity having been provided in March 2021. Provisionally registered pharmacists did not have to sit the assessment in March 2021; the numbers referred to above are only those who sat it for the first time in July 2021.

The results of the July 2021 assessment raise the question as to why those who had spent time in practice as pharmacists - which in some cases may have been almost 1 year at the point of sitting the assessment - would be less likely to pass the exam than those who had not previously practised as pharmacists.

It also raises the issue that 33.6% of the provisionally-registered cohort who sat the assessment - those who failed it - had been allowed to practise as pharmacists. This was before sitting an assessment which showed that by the GPhC's ordinary standards for entry onto the register, they would not have been fit to do so, since the ordinary requirement is that the person has passed the registration assessment. It is not clear what effect this had on public safety and protection. The GPhC has not said whether it has checked for or observed any trends in terms of concerns raised to it in respect of the provisionally-registered cohort, and it does not have oversight of or monitor dispensing errors or other pharmacy incidents.

A further issue is that the pass mark for the calculations part of the exam - paper one - was 25 out of 40 questions (62.5%). If the questions had been written such that it was expected that candidates would be able to do them, this raises the question as to whether a 62.5% pass rate for this part of the assessment is sufficient; should the extent of the assurance provided to the public by the assessment be that pharmacists may only be able to get calculations right at least 62.5% of the time?

These issues were not mentioned by the GPhC when it announced the assessment results.

=== Potential collusion / failure of integrity of the pharmacist registration exam in June 2022 ===
The GPhC's organisation of the June 2022 pharmacist registration exam led to protests outside of its offices on 13 July 2022 and a petition alleging "systematic failure in properly regulating the GPHC exam", which had attracted more than 1,500 signatures as at 14 July 2022.

The exam was held on 29 June 2022, and resulted in the GPhC issuing a formal statement on the same date apologising for the delayed start at 5 out of 113 test centres. However, further issues emerged from candidate accounts in the days immediately following the assessment. These included reports that students were at test centres for 14 hours, including 8 hours without food; were made to end the test 30 mins early because the centre ‘had to close the building’; candidates being able to use phones, with a delayed exam start; loud, distracting noise in some test centres; some trainees being able to look at others' screens during the exam; invigilators not checking calculators for the calculations part of the exam; some candidates being allowed to use a scientific calculator; some questions being almost a page long to read with 3 minutes per question not being enough time; candidates whispering in the exam with no action taken by invigilators; and technical issues whilst attempting the exam with the software used.

The GPhC is responsible for how it chooses to conduct the assessment, and the measures it puts in place to ensure it is properly conducted. Despite the exam being (in its own assessment) a crucial measure to protect the public, the GPhC decided to allow provisional registration, subject to eligibility criteria, for those who were severely impacted by its shortcomings in ensuring the proper conduct and management of the assessment, and who as a result did not pass the exam. Reflecting its anger at its own shortcomings, it issued a formal statement saying that "We share the sense of anger that many have expressed about the severe delays that some candidates sitting the registration assessment have experienced." The decision was made in part to "going a long way to allaying candidates’ concerns about employment and income" (matters which are not part of its regulatory objective of protecting the public).

== Malversation in relation to provisional registration ==
The GPhC's decision in July 2022 to provisionally register as pharmacists individuals who had not passed the June 2022 registration assessment, was based in part, the GPhC said, on the principles “to support the NHS and community pharmacy by strengthening the workforce at this critical time” and "to minimise blockages or gaps in the pipeline for qualified new registrants to join the profession in 2022 and in the coming years". These principles were commensurate with its earlier statement in relation to provisional registration, first introduced in response to the Covid-19 pandemic, that its "final decisions [to introduce provisional registration] have been guided by a set of principles, including... the importance of maintaining the workforce pipeline". The GPhC has no statutory role in “maintaining the workforce pipeline”, or "support[ing] the NHS and community pharmacy". These objectives are in conflict with the GPhC's statutory duty to protect the public; the GPhC has a regulatory role in ensuring appropriate standards among those joining the register, and in removing registrants from the register if they are not fit to practise. “Maintaining the workforce pipeline” operates against it making decisions to remove registrants from the register, set appropriate standards, and restrict registration only to those who are fit to practise.

== Oversight of health and social care regulators ==
The Professional Standards Authority for Health and Social Care (PSA), is an independent body accountable to the UK Parliament, which promotes the health and wellbeing of the public and oversees the nine UK healthcare regulators, including General Pharmaceutical Council. It reviews the GPhC's performance annually, but has no power to compel it to do anything. It says on its website "We do not investigate individuals' complaints about regulators or registers and cannot resolve them for you, but you can help others by sharing your experience." It does not explain how "sharing your experience" will help others in the absence of it investigating or resolving the complaint.

== See also ==
- Association of Pharmacy Technicians UK
- Pharmaceutical industry in the United Kingdom
- List of pharmacy organisations in the United Kingdom
- List of schools of pharmacy in the United Kingdom
- British National Formulary
- The Pharmacy Practice Research Trust
