= Stop AIDS =

Stop AIDS may refer to:

- Stop AIDS Campaign, British public health campaign
- Stop AIDS Project, American public health campaign

== See also ==
- Student Stop AIDS Campaign
