= R v Lee =

UK legal case

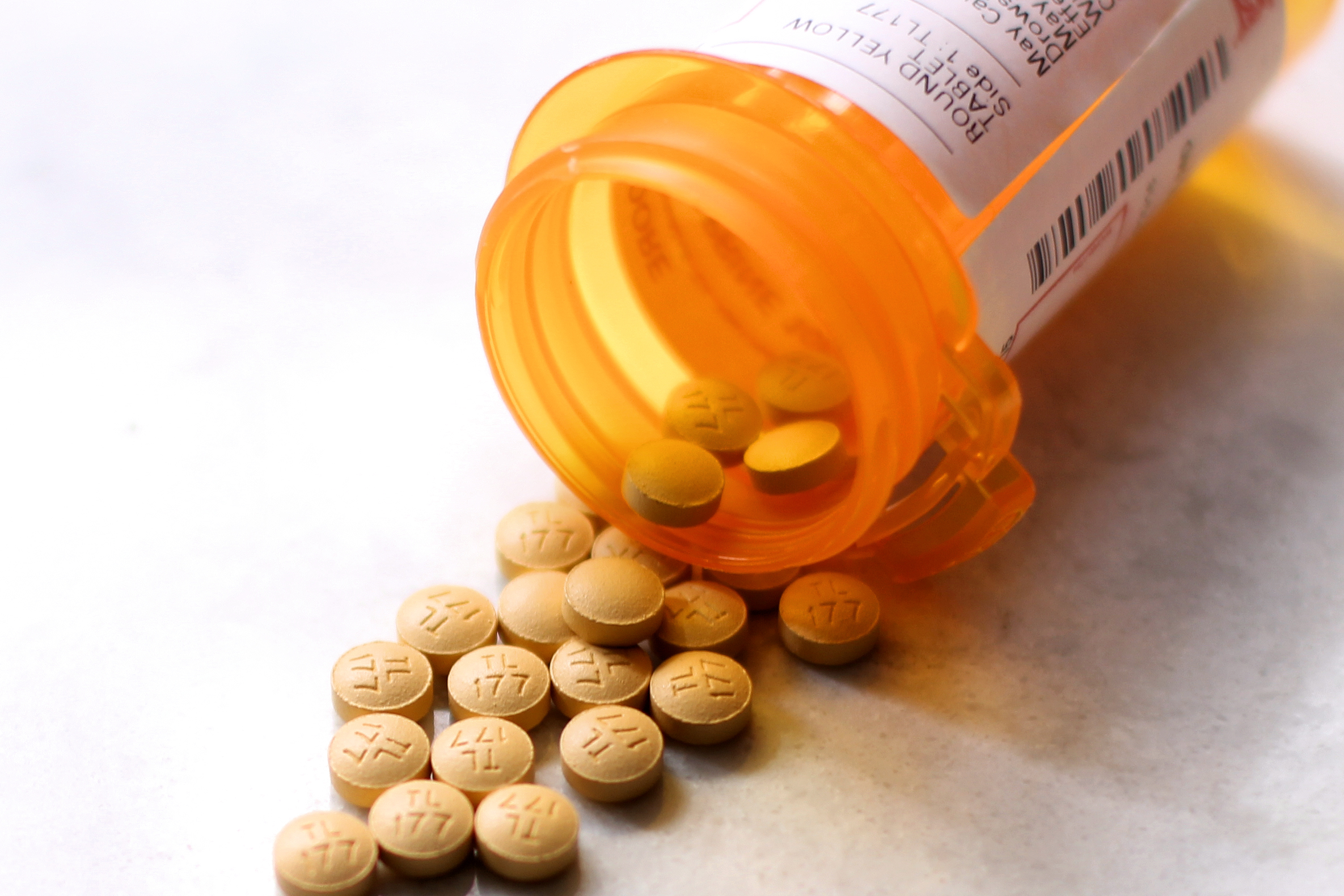
- Court: Court of Appeal (Criminal Division)
- Decided: 26 May 2010
- Citation: [2010] EWCA Crim 1404
- Cases cited: as to substitution of the precise dual charges (offences), using s. 3A of the same Act to do so, R v R and others [2007] 1 Cr App R 10, [2006] EWCA Crim 1974,
- Legislation cited: Medicines Act 1968 Section 64.— Protection of purchasers of medicinal products.

Case history
- Prior actions: R v Lee, Central Criminal Court of England and Wales, 2 April 2009 (unreported)
- Subsequent action: None

Court membership
- Judges sitting: Lord Justice Aikens, Mr Justice Royce, His Honour Judge Radford (joint opinion)

Keywords
- Consumer rights, healthcare rights, pharmacist, dispensing, error, prescription medicines, controlled medicaments

R v Lee is the leading case in England and Wales concerning erroneous professional dispensing of a controlled medicine. The case was considered by foremost judges with a conviction in the Central Criminal Court of England and Wales in front of its President, the Recorder of London, (where a not guilty plea would, if it had occurred, have been determined by the empanelled jury) and its partly successful appeal in the binding precedent-level Court of Appeal. The case confirmed that a serious error in giving a vulnerable customer a potent drug that does not match in any way the prescription, where such action is not the primary causation of any death or suffering, can result in a prosecution of the responsible pharmacist, with up to 2 years imprisonment, depending on the circumstances.

Later guidance and regulation has protected responsible pharmacists able to prove they have adequate, strict safeguards in place and also laid out principles to help to foster those safeguards.

== Summary ==
A patient suffering from cancer with poor respiratory health died three days after Elizabeth Lee, a pharmacist, dispensed or co-dispensed the wrong drug. A full investigation of facts followed and Lee reported the error, which was, before trial, found not to have been the primary cause of death. Lee was given a three-month suspended prison sentence at the Old Bailey. This was reduced to a fine of £300 on appeal at the Court of Appeal. Her case provoked a campaign led by pharmacists and certain leading academics to decriminalise such errors. The defence was led by Glassbrooks Solicitors and the Pharmacists' Defence Association between 2007 and 2010. The case has been used since in pharmacy education and research to explain the English and Welsh law of the supply of medicines. Many professional groups wish the government or parliament to end the fear of criminal prosecution following a pharmacist's inadvertency, leading to a motion to table a Private Member's Bill. Error reporting was not an issue in this case (Lee was commended for not seeking to avoid responsibility for the error from the outset). Decriminalisation of single, inadvertent dispensing errors can be construed as a public safety measure on the basis of encouraging self-reporting transparency, so that pharmacists know that they could report non-deliberate errors of their unit without any fear of gaining a criminal record, and a feedback loop be embedded to any error, however slight (a "just culture" instead of "strict liability in extreme cases" approach). Lee's sanction confirmed the likelihood of conviction for inadvertent dispensing errors where a patient's health deterioration is deeply probed, such as through proximity of death or age of the patient. It prompted pharmacy bodies and a range of MPs to lobby for decriminalisation of non-deliberate errors.

== Dispensing error ==
The percentage of prescription items supplied to patients with an error (the error rate) in the UK is estimated at 0.04 to 3.32%. The human error involved was that the wrong drug was selected, which is a recognised type of error among those made by pharmacists and very few lead to criminal prosecution. However, the details are publicly available in this case and provide an insight into the circumstances.

On Thursday, 30 August 2007, Lee was working as a locum at Tesco Pharmacy, west Windsor. A written prescription was brought in to the pharmacy for 72-year-old Carmel Sheller. It was for amoxicillin capsules (an antibiotic) for a chest infection and 40 prednisolone tablets 5 mg (a steroid) at a dose of eight per day, to be taken for wheezing and lung inflammation. The pharmacist or an assistant printed the labels for the items; but affixed that for prednisolone onto a box of propranolol pills (used to treat high blood pressure, angina or heart arrhythmias).

It was fairly busy – the pharmacy dispensed about 300 prescription items. Lee was amid a 10-hour shift, from 9 am until 7 pm, without a break, save for the time taken to eat lunch in a corner between checking and approving prescriptions. The pharmacy could not function without her presence. The usual pharmacist and a dispensing assistant were on maternity leave.

The prescription labels were produced at 2:41 pm. A spokesman for Tesco said:

The shift length was not relevant to this dispensing error. In this case, the locum pharmacist started work at 9 am and the dispensing error took place around lunchtime. The pharmacist had staff working with her offering support at all times.

It is not known who labelled, assembled or handed out the prescription, but Lee's signatures were on the dispensing label, showing that she had checked the item.

== Events after the error ==
Sheller took eight of the propranolol pills, following the dose prescribed (which her doctor wrote up for prednisolone). She recovered from the effects of taking them.

Her underlying poor physical condition deteriorated and she died in hospital, 3 days after the prescription. The post-mortem examination found that the cause of death was heart failure, chronic bronchitis and lung cancer.

== Upholding of a conviction ==
The Crown Prosecution Service (CPS) prosecuted Lee for the dispensing error. She was originally arrested for gross negligence manslaughter but then charged under the Medicines Act 1968 offences. This was through early lack of useable evidence of that degree. The death also was, per the post mortem, one of natural causes – the dosage in Sheller's blood evincing it was not the primary cause of the death.

On 2 April 2009, before the case went before the President of the Crown Courts of London (and of the Old Bailey) who heard the arguments as to law only and not as to fact in relation to the Medicines Act 1968, as the facts were not contested. Lee admitted both charges. The charge under Section 85 (5) (supplying a label which falsely describes the product or which would likely mislead as to the product's uses or effects) (Note: The whole section, deemed by the Court of Appeal to concern a manufacturer's affixing of labels and other packaging is now governed elsewhere and so repealed by The Human Medicines Regulations 2012, Schedule 35) and charge under 64(1) (selling of any medicinal product not of the nature or quality specified in the prescription) of the Act.

The defence argued that section 85 (5) could only be breached by a person carrying on a business – i.e. the owner of a business and, unsuccessfully, that section 64 (1) was designed in the 1960s to be used where an adulterated product or a product of a poor quality was supplied – not for dispensing errors. The judge made it clear that these arguments were unlikely to succeed (though on appeal, the arguments in relation to section 85 (5) were accepted; the arguments in relation to section 64 (1) were not heard. Following the judge's opinion on the law, Lee pleaded guilty to the s.85 (5) charge. Had she not done so and was found guilty, she could have received a harsher sentence up to a maximum of two years in prison. The single judge granted leave to appeal. In doing so, he said that the issue concerning the proper scope and application of section 85(5) of the Medicines Act 1968 was sufficiently arguable and important to merit consideration by the Court of Appeal; the latter agreed when it made its final decision.

She was sentenced on 2 April 2009 by HH The Recorder of London to three months in prison suspended for 18 months, supervised by the Probation Service for 12 months. The charge against section 64 (1) of the Medicines Act (sale of a medicinal product not of the nature or quality demanded by the purchaser) was allowed to 'lie or remain on file' per section 3A of the Act. In UK law, this means that the judge has decided that there is enough evidence for a case to be made, but that it is not in the public interest for the prosecution to continue, usually because the defendant has pleaded guilty to other charges.

The Recorder of London said Lee bore "no factual or legal responsibility for Mrs Sheller's death". He said he was impressed that she had not sought to avoid responsibility for the error from the outset, and noted that she had resigned from the Royal Pharmaceutical Society of Great Britain (RPSGB) and determined not to work as a pharmacist again. He said a prison sentence was needed to 'mark the gravity of the offence' but the circumstances had persuaded him to suspend it.

== Royal Pharmaceutical Society involvement ==
Lee resigned from the Royal Pharmaceutical Society of Great Britain (RPSGB) register of pharmacists in late 2008. This was remarked upon by the judge in her sentencing on 2 April 2009. However, on 23 April 2009, the RPSGB refused to rule out disciplinary action and confirmed it bore Lee's name on the non-practising register.

On 8 May 2009, the RPSGB registrar granted her request to leave the register voluntarily, because it was not in the public interest to pursue a fitness to practice case.

== Coroner's inquest ==
On 5 March 2010, the local Coroner found that the dispensing error made by Lee was not to blame for Sheller's death. The verdict was recorded at Windsor Guildhall. Post-mortem blood samples showed trace amounts of propranolol and the coroner said the effects were likely to have been "so minimal" at the time of death that they could be "discounted as having any material effect".

== Appeal ==
Lee sought permission to appeal from the Court of Appeal. The permission hearing and appeal itself was heard at the Royal Courts of Justice on 26 May 2010. Lee was represented by Orlando Pownall QC. The wording of section 85(5) of the Medicines Act 1968 indicated that it could only be breached by a person who was carrying on a business. The court ruled that Lee was not the person 'carrying on a business', and so the convictions under section 85(5) must be quashed. In addition, Lee appealed against sentence, which resulted in a fine of £300 being substituted for the suspended prison sentence.

In 2008, the Pharmacists' Defence Association commenced discussions with the Department of Health, CPS and the Director of Public Prosecutions about a CPS protocol relating to prosecutions under the Medicines Act 1968. In late 2009, before Lee's appeal, the publication was expected imminently. It was expected that it would state that where gross negligence manslaughter charges had been excluded, the police and CPS should pass the case to the regulator and not pursue prosecution. This was intended to be an interim solution until Parliament agreed to amend the Medicines Act 1968 to decriminalise dispensing errors.

At the appeal hearing, Lee's defence raised the issue of the new Protocol, hoping it to inform the appeal, if rescheduled. However, the prosecution counsel, having conferred with a CPS legal representative, stated that talks on the Protocol had reached an impasse. The prosecution team could not give a timeframe for its publication and indicated that it could take up to a year; the judges were left with the impression it could take several years.

The appeal began to be heard. The prosecution asked the judge to substitute the conviction under 85(5) of the Medicines Act 1968 for a conviction under section 64(1), which had been allowed to 'lie on file' during the initial hearing. Lee's defence team asked for the section 64(1) charge to continue to lie on file since she had not pleaded guilty to it and the CPS protocol, when published, would likely mean that the CPS would no longer pursue a prosecution. The prosecution stated, however, that they would pursue a fresh prosecution for that breach if the issue was left to lie on file.

The judges considered ordering a retrial as to the section 64 charge but Lee had no desire for further court appearances. Her legal team said "It would be like returning to the scene of a road traffic accident". Lee thus accepted the substituted (on-file) charge. She was ordered to pay a fine of £300.

The appeal judge noted the large impact of events on the Sheller and Lee families, and also the 'very many letters which speak of her [Lee's] good character and many good works'. By the time of the appeal Lee had taken a job as a cleaner in her church, having decided never to resume as a pharmacist, cancelling registration (kept by the RPSGB).

== Ministerial comment and Early Day Motion ==
Shadow Minister for Health and Pharmacy, Lord Howe, said in June 2009 that

The risk to the public comes not from dodgy pharmacists, but from potentially dangerous working practices. Tesco seems to be noticeably reticent in admitting that they may have had some contribution to the error that occurred. When a pharmacist is made to work regular 10-hour shifts, you cannot put the entire blame on that one individual. Supermarkets and major pharmacy multiples cannot wash their hands of the health and safety implications which their pharmacists are subject to.

The All-Party Parliamentary Group for pharmacy met on 16 June 2009 in the House of Commons to investigate the impact of the Lee case on community pharmacists. The Chairman, Howard Stoate MP, tabled an early day motion calling for a change in the law. He said

I don't think anybody quite appreciated what could happen to a pharmacist who made a simple human error just on one occasion and is automatically criminalised by the current law. As far as I'm aware there are no other professional groups, certainly within the NHS to which that applies.

== Aftermath and impact on pharmacy in the UK ==
The main Code for prosecutors was updated in February 2010 and the similar, more detailed, Protocol was published three weeks after the appeal hearing, on 21 June 2010. This added the factor strongly indicating against prosecution of: "Has regulatory or remedial action been taken (against a pharmacist or technician), or is it likely to be taken?".

Lee's prosecution caused concern that it would lead to non-reporting and under-reporting of dispensing errors by pharmacists, impacting patient safety and the ability to learn from mistakes.

In June 2009, well before Lee's appeal hearing, the RPSGB carried out a survey which found that almost half the pharmacists questioned would reassess whether they would record dispensing errors in an error log. More than 12,000 pharmacists signed a petition calling for the law to be repealed. Issues with workplace pressure also surfaced, with 4% of pharmacists in a survey carried out by Chemist + Druggist saying that they had contemplated suicide as a result of the stress.

A national effort to decriminalise dispensing errors was catalyzed by the case. One report said of Lee, "It's up to us to complete the job and ensure her legacy is as the pharmacist who brought an end to criminal prosecutions for dispensing errors." This backstop law has not changed and can be applied, in heavily investigated, extreme cases, where on the facts, a prosecution can be seen to be in the public interest, as confirmed by the Court of Appeal.

== Responsible Pharmacist regulations ==
At the heart of the guidance (Protocol) is the regulation that it is the responsible pharmacist (RP) who is now required to establish, maintain and keep under review procedures to ensure that a pharmacy is operating in a safe and effective manner. The RP will need to

demonstrate that he or she had put in place and operated written standard operating procedures, defining individual responsibilities and accountabilities, establishing procedures for identifying and remedying poor performance and ensuring that members of the dispensary team are suitably trained and competent to undertake the tasks for which they are responsible.

Reality sometimes differs. Many community and hospital pharmacists have employers extremely reluctant to allow their RPs to have this level of control. A pharmacy, in which they work, might be controlled by their employer or by someone other than the RP. The defence association has cases where RPs confront discipline by employers, or dismissal because the employer does not allow them to exercise their statutory duties under the RP regulations.

== Notes and references ==
Footnote
