= Association of Pharmacy Technicians UK =

Professional Association

The Association of Pharmacy Technicians UK is a professional association for pharmacy technicians in the United Kingdom of Great Britain and Northern Ireland. It is based in Birmingham and has 10 local branches. It is constituted as a company limited by guarantee and was formed in January 1952.

== Background ==
Technicians in the UK have been registered with the General Pharmaceutical Council since 2011 and in 2017 the association and the Royal Pharmaceutical Society produced a joint statement of intent for partnership working, and revealed they are looking to “align the two professional leadership bodies. The association has been consulted on proposals for a new single qualification for pharmacy technicians.

The association supports plans to allow technicians to oversee the supply of medicines which have been criticised by the National Pharmacy Association. Tess Fenn had been the president of the association since 2014 and stood down in 2018.
