= Weatherhead High School =

Girls' secondary school with sixth-form in Wallasey, Wirral, England

Coordinates: 53°24′53″N 03°03′27″W

Location
- Breck Rd; Wallasey, Merseyside, CH44 3HS; England

Information
- Type: Academy
- Department for Education URN: 137815 Tables
- Ofsted: Reports
- Headteacher: Dominic Mackenzie
- Gender: Girls
- Age: 11 to 18
- Website: http://www.weatherheadhigh.co.uk/

Weatherhead High School is a single sex girls' academy school with mixed Sixth Form, located in Merseyside, England in the Metropolitan Borough of Wirral. In 2003, the school relocated from three separate sites around the Wallasey area to a new purpose-built state of the art site on Breck Road.

The school has over 1500 pupils on roll, ranging from 11 to 18. There is a mixed Sixth Form of up to 400 students.

The school has held the Sportsmark Award and the Artsmark Gold Award for several years.

Former students include Katie Petty-Saphon and Natasha Jonas.
