= Alliance for Heart Failure =

The Alliance for Heart Failure is a coalition of charities, patient groups, professional bodies, public sector organisations and corporate members working together to raise the profile of heart failure within the UK Government, the National Health Service, and media. It was formed in October 2015.

The Alliance for Heart Failure's mission is to achieve better outcomes for people with heart failure by ensuring timely diagnosis and access to the right care and support.

== Membership ==
Current members of the Alliance for Heart Failure are:

- AstraZeneca UK
- British Association for Cardiovascular Prevention and Rehabilitation
- British Society for Heart Failure
- British Association for Nursing in Cardiovascular Care
- British Society for Echocardiography
- Cardiomyopathy UK
- Cardiovascular Care Partnership UK
- Education for Health
- Health Innovation Network
- Medtronic UK
- National Heart & Lung Institute
- The Primary Care Pharmacy Association
- Pumping Marvellous Foundation
- Roche Diagnostics Ltd
- South East Clinical Networks
- UK Clinical Pharmacy Association

== Organisation ==
The co-chairs are Preeti Minhas from Bupa and Katharine McIntosh from Cardiomyopathy UK. They have a 12-month tenure. Day-to-day decisions are made by a steering committee.

The Alliance for Heart Failure is supported and funded by AstraZeneca UK, Medtronic Limited, and Roche Diagnostics Ltd. Funders are not responsible for any of the materials produced by the Alliance for Heart Failure, which are created independently by the Alliance's Secretariat.

== Call To Action: Transforming heart failure services in the community ==
In late 2025, its 10th anniversary year, the Alliance published a report on heart failure in primary care.

In the report, the Alliance advises that local and national leadership must now urgently support and prioritise a change in culture across primary care to dramatically improve the early diagnosis and management of heart failure.

Transforming heart failure services in the community draws on over five years of learning and working with primary care heart specialists. It lays out solutions to achieve this: from improving the uptake of NT-proBNP testing, expanding screening via pharmacies and Community Diagnostic Centres, to supporting primary care to better optimise medication in the community.

It draws on case studies, pilot projects, and the Alliance's recent research into access to NT-proBNP testing in CDCs.

== Heart Failure: A call to action ==
Heart Failure: A call to action was published on 22 February 2021. The report evaluates the progress made since the 2016 All Party Parliamentary Group ‘Focus on Heart Failure’ report and makes ten new recommendations to improve heart failure care and patient outcomes.

The report also calls for urgent action to meet the growing demand from a rising number of heart failure cases following the impact of the COVID-19 pandemic .

Heart Failure: A call to action was developed with input from heart failure specialists, patient groups, and professional organisations.

== All Party Parliamentary Group on Heart Disease Inquiry into heart failure ==
In 2016, the All Party Parliamentary Group on Heart Disease, chaired by Stuart Andrew MP, held an inquiry into living with heart failure. Written and oral evidence was provided by patients, healthcare professionals, and commissioners. The Inquiry's report, Focus on Heart Failure, was published in September 2016 and made ten recommendations for improving heart failure services.

Nine members of the Alliance for Heart Failure were co-opted onto an advisory panel for the inquiry. The panel had ten members in total.

== National Heart Failure Audit ==
=== 2020-21 Audit ===
The National Heart Failure Audit which analysed data from 2020 to 2021, highlighted a serious issue with access to echocardiography services, a vital diagnostic tool for heart failure, as well as a problem with follow up specialist care and cardiac rehabilitation for those living long-term with the illness. It also highlighted the chronic challenge of training and developing echocardiographers to ensure sufficient resources to meet demand in the future.

The Alliance for Heart Failure responded to the report stating that longstanding issues have been exacerbated, rather than caused, by the COVID-19 pandemic.

=== 2017-18 Audit ===
The National Heart Failure Audit (2017–18), published on 12 September 2019, reported that mortality among patients admitted to hospital remained high overall at 10.1% compared to 9.4% in the previous audit. However, the number of patients seen by heart failure specialists increased to over 82% (from 80% in the last audit), while more than 88% of patients get an echocardiogram. Rates still remain higher for those admitted to Cardiology (92%), however this has decreased since the last report (96%). The rate on General Medical wards remained the same at 84%. The report also recorded an increase in the prescription of key disease-modifying medicines for patients since last year.

The Alliance for Heart Failure responded positively to the report but called for the regional variation in patient service to be urgently addressed.

== National Confidential Enquiry into Patient Outcome and Death (NCEPOD) ==
The National Confidential Enquiry into Patient Outcome and Death (NCEPOD), published on 22 November 2018, recommended improvements in the process of care for patients with acute heart failure who died while admitted to hospital as an emergency. Responding to the report, the Alliance for Heart Failure said that it reinforces the need for urgent action to improve heart failure services, and the important role of heart failure specialist nurses, as part of a full multi-disciplinary heart failure team, in maximising outcomes for patients.
