= List of pharmacy schools in the United Kingdom =

This list of schools of pharmacy in the United Kingdom includes all thirty GPhC or PSNI registered MPharm degree-issuing schools of pharmacy in the United Kingdom. There are twenty-seven such schools in England, two in Scotland, one in Wales and two in Northern Ireland.

== England ==
Name	University	Established	Comments	Ref.
School of Life and Health Sciences	Aston	1895		
Department of Pharmacy and Pharmacology.	Bath	1907	Founded as the Bristol and West College of Pharmacy and Chemistry	
School of Pharmacy	Birmingham	2011		
School of Pharmacy	Bradford	1966		
School of Pharmacy and Biomolecular Sciences	Brighton	1858		
School of Pharmacy and Pharmaceutical Sciences	Central Lancashire	2007		
School of Pharmacy	Newcastle	2013 (Durham)	Transferred to Newcastle in 2017	
School of Pharmacy	De Montfort	1886		
School of Chemical Sciences and Pharmacy	East Anglia	2003		
Medway School of Pharmacy	Greenwich & Kent	2004		
School of Pharmacy	Hertfordshire	2005		
School of Pharmacy	Huddersfield	2008		
School of Pharmacy	Keele	2006		
Department of Pharmacy	Kingston	2004		
School of Pharmacy	Lincoln	2014		
The School of Pharmacy & Biomolecular Sciences	Liverpool John Moores	1849		
UCL School of Pharmacy	University College London	1842	Founded as the College of the Pharmaceutical Society	
Department of Pharmacy	King's College London	1926		
School of Pharmacy and Pharmaceutical Sciences	Manchester	1883		
Nottingham University School of Pharmacy	Nottingham	1925		
School of Pharmacy and Biomedical Sciences	Portsmouth	1916	Founded as Portsmouth Polytechnic School of Pharmacy	
School of Health, Sciences and Society	Suffolk			
Reading School of Pharmacy	Reading	2005		
Department of Pharmacy, Health and Well-being	Sunderland	1921		
School of Life Sciences	Sussex	2016		
Faculty of Science and Engineering	Wolverhampton	2006		

== Scotland ==
- Robert Gordon University - School of Pharmacy & Life Sciences
- University of Strathclyde - Strathclyde Institute of Pharmacy and Biomedical Sciences

== Wales ==
- Cardiff University - Welsh School of Pharmacy
- Swansea University

== Northern Ireland ==
- Queen's University Belfast - School of Pharmacy
- University of Ulster (Coleraine) - Department of Pharmacy and Pharmaceutical Sciences

== See also ==
- List of pharmacy schools
- List of universities in the United Kingdom
- List of pharmacy organisations in the United Kingdom
- List of medical schools in the United Kingdom
- List of dental schools in the United Kingdom
- Royal Pharmaceutical Society of Great Britain
