= PSNC =

PSNC may refer to

- Preservation Society of Newport County
- Pacific Steam Navigation Company
- Puget Sound Navigation Company
- Pharmaceutical Services Negotiating Committee
- PSNC Energy
