= Separation of prescribing and dispensing =

Medical practice

Separation of prescribing and dispensing, also called dispensing separation, is a practice in medicine and pharmacy in which the physician who provides a medical prescription is independent from the pharmacist who provides the prescription drug.

In the Western world there are centuries of tradition for separating pharmacists from physicians. However, in Asian countries it is traditional for physicians to also provide drugs.

Contemporary research indicates that separation of prescribing and dispensing lowers expenditure on drugs, because physician-prescribing gives doctors an incentive to over-prescribe. This is an example of a conflict of interest in the healthcare industry leading to unnecessary health care.

== Background ==
In many Western jurisdictions such as the United States, pharmacists are regulated separately from physicians. These jurisdictions also usually specify that only pharmacists may supply scheduled pharmaceuticals to the public, and that pharmacists cannot form business partnerships with physicians or give them "kickback" payments. In other words, the diagnosing physicians' role is supposed to extend only as far as providing proper prescriptions to patients, who are then entitled to purchase the prescribed drugs at the pharmacies of their choice.

However, the American Medical Association (AMA) Code of Ethics provides that physicians may dispense drugs within their office practices as long as there is no patient exploitation and patients have the right to a written prescription that can be filled elsewhere. 7 to 10 percent of American physicians practices reportedly dispense drugs on their own.

In some rural areas in the United Kingdom, there are dispensing physicians who are allowed to both prescribe and dispense prescription-only medicines to their patients from within their practices. The law requires that the GP practice be located in a designated rural area and that there is also a specified, minimum distance (currently 1 mile; 1.6 kilometres) between a patient's home and the nearest retail pharmacy. See Dispensing Doctors' Association.

This law also exists in Austria for general physicians if the nearest pharmacy is more than 4 kilometers (2 1/2 miles) away, or where none is registered in the city. Switzerland also allows dispensing physicians in several Kantons.

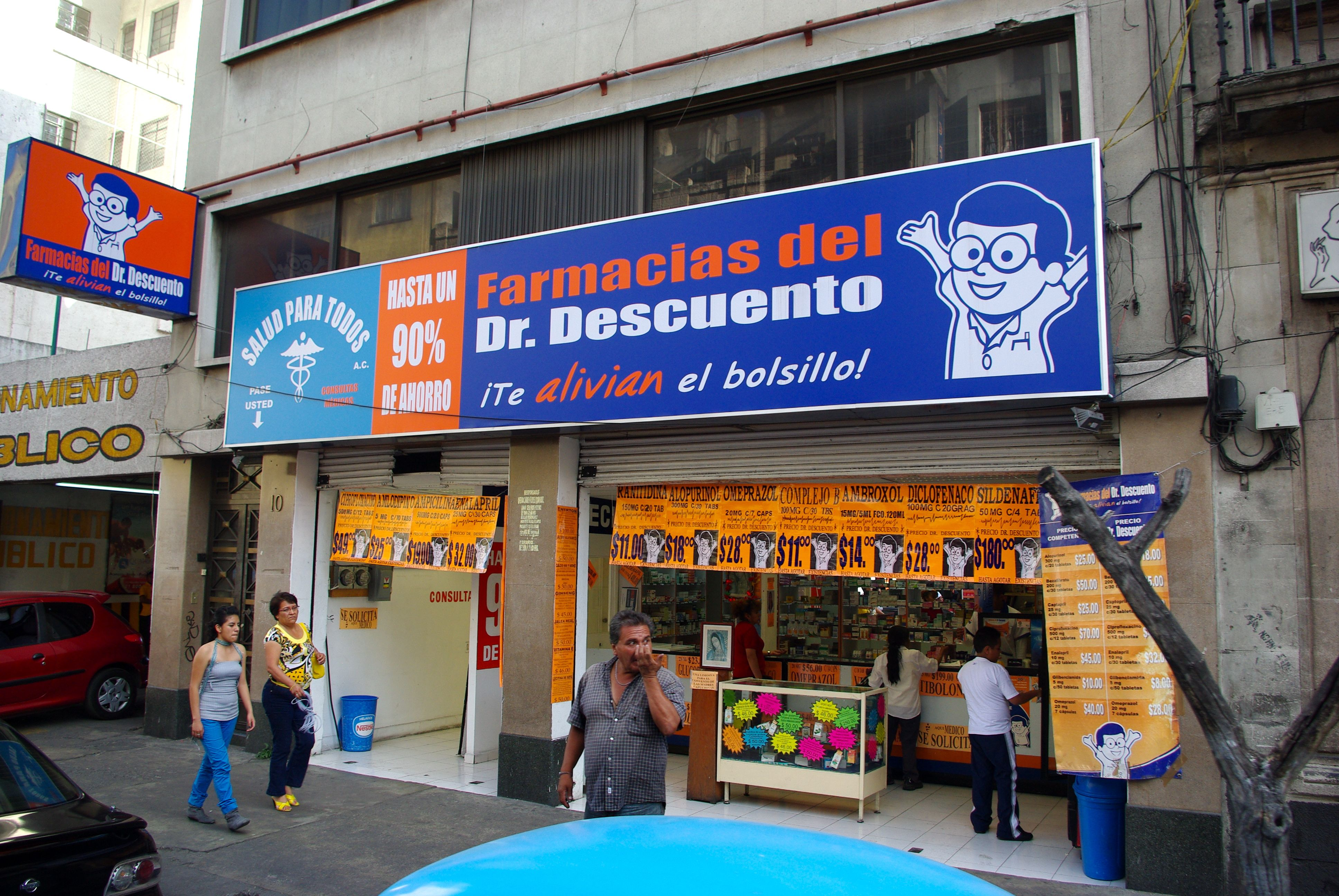
One of a chain of pharmacies in Mexico City, Mexico, named "Doctor Discount," March 2010.

In other jurisdictions (particularly in Asian countries such as China, Malaysia, and Singapore), doctors are allowed to dispense drugs themselves and the practice of pharmacy is sometimes integrated with that of the physician, particularly in traditional Chinese medicine.

In Canada it is common for a medical clinic and a pharmacy to be located together and for the ownership in both enterprises to be common, but licensed separately.

The reason for the majority rule is the high risk of a conflict of interest and/or the avoidance of absolute powers. Otherwise, the physician has a financial self-interest in "diagnosing" as many conditions as possible, and in exaggerating their seriousness, because he or she can then sell more medications to the patient. Such self-interest directly conflicts with the patient's interest in obtaining cost-effective medication and avoiding the unnecessary use of medication that may have side-effects. This system reflects much similarity to the checks and balances system of the U.S. and many other governments.

A campaign for separation has begun in many countries and has already been successful in some places (as in Korea). As many of the remaining nations move towards separation, resistance and lobbying from dispensing doctors who have pecuniary interests may prove a major stumbling block (e.g. in Malaysia).

== Experience in Asian countries ==
In many Asian countries there is no traditional separation between physician and pharmacist. In Taiwan, a plan initiated in March 1997 experimented with separating doctors who prescribe from pharmacists who fulfill prescriptions, on the theory that this would reduce unnecessary health care. The plan had mixed results. The South Korean government passed a law in 2000 which separated drug prescribing from dispensing. The passing of the law achieved some of its intentions but also caused unexpected problems. Japan also is experimenting with separation of prescribing and dispensing. In Malaysia, as of 2016, separation of prescribing and dispensing only occurs in government hospitals.
