= Association of the British Pharmaceutical Industry =

British trade group

- Abbreviation: ABPI
- Formation: 1891
- Legal status: Industry trade group
- Purpose: Pharmaceutical industry trade organisation
- Location: ABPI Head Office, 2nd Floor Goldings House, Hay’s Galleria, 2 Hay’s Lane, London, SE1 2HB.
- Region served: United Kingdom
- Members: Pharmaceutical manufacturers
- Chief Executive: Richard Torbett
- Website: ABPI

The Association of the British Pharmaceutical Industry (ABPI) is the trade association representing companies that research, develop and supply prescription medicines in the United Kingdom..

Founded in 1891, the ABPI’s membership comprises around 120 large and small biopharmaceutical firms engaged in the discovery and delivery of medicines for the National Health Service (NHS) and private markets.

The association participates in public policy discussions on medicines pricing, access, and innovation, and develops industry standards to promote prescription medicines. The self-regulatory ABPI Code of Practice sets ethical guidelines for interactions between member companies and healthcare professionals, patient organisations and the public and is administered independently by the Prescription Medicines Code of Practice Authority (PMCPA).

The ABPI’s activities also include advocacy on regulatory and health system issues affecting the UK life sciences sector.

== History ==
The organisation was founded in London in 1891 and originally known as the "Drug Club". It was re-named the Association of the British Pharmaceutical Industry in 1948. A rival institution to represent wholesalers, the "Northern Wholesale Druggists' Association", was formed in 1902 and lasted until 1966.

== Management and offices ==
The ABPI Board is the most senior forum for member company input into the ABPI. Seats on the Board are available for the UK leaders of all large and mid-sized pharmaceutical company members of the ABPI. ABPI's smaller pharmaceutical company members also elect three smaller company UK leads to also join the Board to represent the interests and views of smaller companies.

The ABPI's head office is in London with three regional offices in Cardiff, Belfast and Edinburgh.

== Membership ==
Membership of the Association of the British Pharmaceutical Industry is not open to individuals, only companies. Members fall into three categories:

- Full members who hold marketing authorisation for manufacture or supply of a prescription medicine for human use and who undertake business in the UK
- Research affiliate members who carry out business in the UK and are involved in research and/or development of medicines for human use but do not have a UK sales operation, for example contract research organisations or contract manufacturing organizations
- General affiliate members who operate in the UK, have a business interest in the industry and will typically provide products or services to the industry, although not producing prescription medicines, for example law firms

== Functions ==
The Association of the British Pharmaceutical Industry (ABPI) serves as the principal trade association representing the pharmaceutical industry in the United Kingdom. Its core functions include advocacy, policy engagement, industry representation, standard setting and the facilitation of dialogue between its members and government, the National Health Service (NHS) and other stakeholders in health and life sciences policy.

Advocacy and Policy Representation

A central function of the ABPI is to represent the interests and perspectives of its member companies to government departments, regulators, health system decision-makers and international bodies. The association engages in public policy discussions on access to medicines, research and development investment, regulatory frameworks, health innovation, pricing and competitiveness in the UK life sciences sector. Through policy submissions, consultations and strategic engagement, the ABPI seeks to influence legislation and policy to support medical innovation and patient access to new treatments.

Industry Standards and Self-Regulation

The ABPI develops and maintains industry standards to ensure ethical conduct by its members. This includes stewarding the ABPI Code of Practice, which sets standards for pharmaceutical promotion and interactions between companies, healthcare professionals and patient organisations. Although the Code is administered independently by the Prescription Medicines Code of Practice Authority (PMCPA), compliance with the Code is a condition of ABPI membership.

Information Sharing and Capacity Building

The ABPI facilitates the exchange of information, advice and guidance among its members and with third parties such as healthcare providers, academia, research institutions and patient groups. It supports professional development and understanding of the pharmaceutical sector through resources, reports and strategic partnerships that aim to improve knowledge of scientific research, industry trends and careers in the life sciences.

Enhancing Industry Reputation

Another function of the ABPI is to enhance the reputation and public understanding of the pharmaceutical industry in the UK. This includes coordinating transparency initiatives such as Disclosure UK, which publishes information on payments and transfers of value from pharmaceutical companies to healthcare professionals and organisations; and promoting the contribution of the sector to public health, research and economic growth.

Strategic Collaboration

The ABPI convenes forums and partnerships with governments, healthcare organisations, patient groups and other industry players to address shared challenges in health and innovation. Through strategic collaboration, the association works to support NHS planning, improve access to medicines, strengthen the UK’s research ecosystem and contribute to broader life sciences policy development.

== The ABPI Code of Practice ==
The ABPI Code of Practice for the Pharmaceutical Industry is a self-regulatory code that sets standards for the ethical promotion of prescription medicines and for interactions between pharmaceutical companies and healthcare professionals, decision-makers, patient organisations and the public in the United Kingdom.

Compliance with the Code is a condition of membership of the Association of the British Pharmaceutical Industry (ABPI), and a significant number of non-member companies operating in the UK have also agreed to be bound by it and to accept its enforcement mechanisms.

The Code was first introduced in 1958 and has been revised regularly to reflect changes in medicines legislation, regulatory practice and expectations around transparency and ethical conduct. Each edition is accompanied by a constitution and procedure setting out how the Code is administered and enforced.

The Code applies primarily to the promotion of prescription-only medicines to healthcare professionals and other relevant decision-makers. It governs advertising and promotional materials, representative activities, meetings and hospitality, sponsorship, the provision of samples, and relationships with patient organisations. It also sets standards for the provision of information about prescription medicines to patients and the public, while prohibiting the promotion of prescription-only medicines directly to the general public.

The core principles of the Code require that information and promotional activities are accurate, balanced, fair and not misleading, and that pharmaceutical companies maintain high standards of professional conduct with patient safety as a primary consideration. The Code also contains specific requirements relating to transparency, including disclosures around transfers of value to healthcare professionals and organisations.

Administration and enforcement of the Code are carried out independently by the Prescription Medicines Code of Practice Authority (PMCPA), which operates at arm’s length from the ABPI. The PMCPA provides guidance on compliance, investigates complaints from healthcare professionals, competitors and members of the public, and publishes detailed rulings. Sanctions for breaches can include corrective statements, withdrawal of materials, audits of company procedures, public reprimands, and in serious cases suspension or expulsion from ABPI membership.

The 2024 edition of the ABPI Code of Practice came into effect on 1 October 2024, with full enforcement from 1 January 2025. This edition consolidated a number of previously recommended practices into mandatory requirements, updated provisions on the presentation of prescribing information (including the use of digital access mechanisms such as QR codes), and strengthened procedural rules governing complaints and appeals.

The ABPI Code is recognised in wider public-sector guidance as the principal ethical framework governing pharmaceutical industry conduct. For example, the Scottish Government’s A Common Understanding – Working Together for the People of Scotland guidance on collaboration between NHSScotland and the pharmaceutical industry explicitly references the Code. It states that joint-working and collaborative initiatives must comply with the ABPI Code, be transparent, set out in written agreements, focused on patient benefit, and must not constitute inducements to prescribe, supply or recommend medicines.

== Disclosure UK ==
Disclosure UK is a voluntary transparency initiative operated by the Association of the British Pharmaceutical Industry (ABPI) that publishes detailed information on payments and other benefits in kind made by pharmaceutical companies to healthcare professionals (HCPs), healthcare organisations (HCOs) and other relevant decision makers in the United Kingdom. It is part of a broader European effort to increase transparency in industry–healthcare relationships and is intended to enable public understanding of financial interactions that may influence clinical practice, research or education.

Disclosure UK operates a searchable online database where stakeholders, including patients, researchers and regulators, can explore declared transfers of value by year and by company. Companies that abide by the ABPI Code of Practice are required under that Code to submit data to Disclosure UK by specified annual deadlines, and the data are published together on a defined publication date for each reporting cycle.

The database includes transfers of value such as consultancy fees, speaker fees, sponsorship of events, research grants, and other benefits provided to individual healthcare professionals and healthcare organisations. Methodological notes detailing how individual companies compile and submit their data are also available through the platform.

Disclosure UK is one of the primary mechanisms for making industry–healthcare financial interactions visible in the UK, but participation is tied to compliance with the ABPI Code of Practice rather than statutory obligation. The 2023–25 Government consultation and subsequent response highlighted the potential need for enhanced public reporting requirements and indicated that existing voluntary schemes such as Disclosure UK may inform future guidance or regulation on transparency in industry payments.

== Criticism and discussion ==
Ben Goldacre criticised the pharmaceutical industry in his 2012 book Bad Pharma as testing itself what it manufactures in "poorly designed trials, on hopelessly small numbers of weird, unrepresentative patients, and analysed using techniques that are flawed by design, in such a way that they exaggerate the benefits of treatments". The ABPI responded that medicines were "tested against the most effective comparator where possible unless there is no current standard of care." Regarding "results that companies don't like, [which] they are perfectly entitled to hide [..] from doctors and patients ... academic papers, which everyone thinks of as objective, are often covertly planned and written by people who work directly for the companies, without disclosure." the ABPI responded that it did "... not seek to "hide" trial data" and was recognising there was "still work to be done in ensuring the publication of negative trial data within journals, and in ensuring greater transparency all round within the industry".

The global campaign to improve clinical trial reporting that resulted from Goldacre's book ultimately led the European Commission, in 2014, to require that all trials on the EU Clinical Trials Register (EUCTR) post results to the registry within 12 months of completion (final compliance date 21 December 2016). A similar US law in force since January 2018 (the FDA Amendments Act 2007, FDAAA) requires results of certain trials registered on clinicaltrials.gov (i.e. a much wider set of clinical trials, including medical devices) to report results on the same timescale.

In a 2018 study of Compliance with this requirement published in the BMJ, Ben Goldacre and colleagues found that commercial sponsors were now substantially more likely to post results on the EU Clinical Trials register than trials with non-commercial sponsors. In 2019, a report by the UK Parliament's Science and Technology Select Committee said: "Compliance with transparency rules varies by sponsor—while pharmaceutical companies have good rates of reporting within a reasonable timeframe, the picture is much more mixed for universities. It is particularly disappointing that trusted bodies such as Public Health England and a range of NHS Foundation Trusts are also failing to report results from clinical trials."

== See also ==
- Faculty of Pharmaceutical Medicine
- List of pharmaceutical companies
- List of pharmaceutical manufacturers in the United Kingdom
- List of pharmacy organisations in the United Kingdom
- Lobbying in the United Kingdom
- Medicines and Healthcare products Regulatory Agency
- Pharmaceutical industry in the United Kingdom
- Royal Pharmaceutical Society of Great Britain
