= Prescription Medicines Code of Practice Authority =

UK self-regulatory body administering the pharmaceutical Code of Practice

- Abbreviation: PMCPA
- Formation: 1 January 1993
- Type: Self-regulatory authority
- Legal status: Division of the Association of the British Pharmaceutical Industry
- Purpose: Administration of the ABPI Code of Practice for the Pharmaceutical Industry
- Headquarters: 2nd Floor, Goldings House, Hay’s Galleria, 2 Hay’s Lane, London, SE1 2HB, United Kingdom
- Region served: United Kingdom
- Chief Executive: Alex Fell
- Website: https://www.pmcpa.org.uk/

The Prescription Medicines Code of Practice Authority (PMCPA) is a United Kingdom-based self-regulatory body responsible for administering the ABPI Code of Practice for the Pharmaceutical Industry on an independent basis. The PMCPA oversees compliance with the Code, provides guidance and training, and implements the complaints procedure under which promotional materials and activities of pharmaceutical companies are considered.

== History ==
The PMCPA was established by the ABPI on 1 January 1993 to administer the ABPI Code of Practice at arm's length from the trade association itself. Although the Authority operates independently in its adjudicative role, it remains a division of the ABPI, which is a company limited by guarantee registered in England and Wales.

== Functions ==
The primary role of the PMCPA is to administer and enforce the ABPI Code of Practice, which sets ethical standards for the promotion of prescription medicines and interactions between pharmaceutical companies and healthcare professionals and organisations. Its main functions include:

- Operating the complaints procedure under which alleged breaches of the ABPI Code are considered by the Code of Practice Panel and, where required, the Code of Practice Appeal Board;
- Providing advice, guidance and training on the interpretation and application of the ABPI Code;
- Arranging conciliation between companies when requested;
- Conducting periodic scrutiny of samples of advertising and professional meetings to promote compliance.

The PMCPA is not an investigatory body in the legal sense; rather, its complaints process is essentially adversarial, with the burden of proof resting on the complainant and evidence provided by both parties to a case.

== Complaints and enforcement ==
Complaints alleging breaches of the ABPI Code are submitted to the PMCPA and considered by the Code of Practice Panel. Where appropriate, cases may be referred to the Code of Practice Appeal Board. If a breach is upheld, the PMCPA may impose sanctions including corrective statements, recovery or amendment of promotional materials, audits of company procedures, public reprimands, and other remedies specified under the Code.

== See also ==
- Association of the British Pharmaceutical Industry
- ABPI Code of Practice
- Pharmaceutical industry in the United Kingdom
