= Katie Petty-Saphon =

Katie Petty-Saphon MBE has been Chief Executive of the Medical Schools Council since 2003. She also oversees the associated membership organisations: the Dental Schools Council, the Veterinary Schools Council, the Pharmacy Schools Council, and the Association of Dental Hospitals.

She was appointed Member of the Order of the British Empire (MBE) for her services to medicine in 2011 and has been a fellow of the Academy of Medical Educators since 2015.

== Early life and education ==
Born on Merseyside she attended Wallasey High School and then Newnham College, Cambridge. After International Voluntary Service in Cameroon she worked and studied at the University of Pennsylvania in Philadelphia publishing 10 papers with Professor P L Dutton, FRS. She joined Professor Baz Jackson's lab in Birmingham in 1976. Her PhD from the University of Birmingham was entitled Proton Translocation and ATP Synthesis in Photosynthetic Bacteria.

== Medical Schools Council ==
After a career in the private sector as Further Education Publisher for Africa for the Longman Group and co-founder of EPA Press and Spine-issimus Ltd, in 2003 she was appointed Director of what was the Council of Heads of Medical Schools and is now the Medical Schools Council. She was instrumental in achieving agreement between the majority of medical schools to set up the UK Clinical Aptitude Test in 2005. In 2007 she was the Chief Operating Officer for the Independent Inquiry into Modernising Careers led by Sir John Tooke. In 2009 she oversaw the creation of the Medical Schools Council's Assessment Alliance and in 2013 MSC Assessment which developed the Prescribing Safety Assessment with the British Pharmacological Society and develops and delivers the Situational Judgement Tests for Health Education England. In 2013-14 MSC led Selecting for Excellence – a project tasked with improving the evidence base around selection decisions and increasing the number of successful applicants to medical school from widening participation backgrounds. This was particularity important as applicant data analysis had shown that students from wealthier backgrounds were more likely to be accepted into medical school, an issue Katie argues must be addressed to ensure "we have the right opportunities for all those pupils who have the right aptitude to be excellent professionals.” In 2016, alongside the Chief Executive of NHS Employers, she discussed the impact of the UK's decision to leave the European Union on British health and social care.

== Governor and trusteeships ==
She was a Governor of Hatfield Polytechnic when it became the University of Hatfield and for 10 years a non-Executive Director of Princess Alexandra Hospital in Harlow. She is a Trustee of UKCAT and of the Schwab Westheimer Trust and the Company Secretary for the charities the Medical Schools Council and MSC Assessment. She was President of the Associates of Newnham College Cambridge from 2011–2014.
