= Pharmaceutical industry in the United Kingdom =

The pharmaceutical industry in the United Kingdom directly employs around 73,000 people and in 2007 contributed £8.4 billion to the UK's GDP and invested a total of £3.9 billion in research and development. In 2007 exports of pharmaceutical products from the UK totalled £14.6 billion, creating a trade surplus in pharmaceutical products of £4.3 billion.

UK Pharmaceutical employment of 73,000 in 2017 compares to 114,000 as of 2015 in Germany, 92,000 as of 2014 in France and 723,000 in the European Union as a whole. In the United States 281,440 people worked in the pharmaceutical industry as of 2016.

By the early 2020s, the scale of the UK pharmaceutical industry had increased substantially. According to the Association of the British Pharmaceutical Industry (ABPI), the sector directly employed around 126,000 people, contributed approximately £17.6 billion in direct gross value added (GVA), and generated exports worth around £26.1 billion in 2023.

The UK is home to GlaxoSmithKline and AstraZeneca, respectively the world's fifth- and sixth-largest pharmaceutical companies measured by 2009 market share. It is also home to the multinational Hikma Pharmaceuticals. Foreign companies with a major presence in the UK pharmaceutical industry include Pfizer, Novartis, Hoffmann–La Roche and Eisai. One in five of the world's biggest-selling prescription drugs were developed in the UK.

== History ==
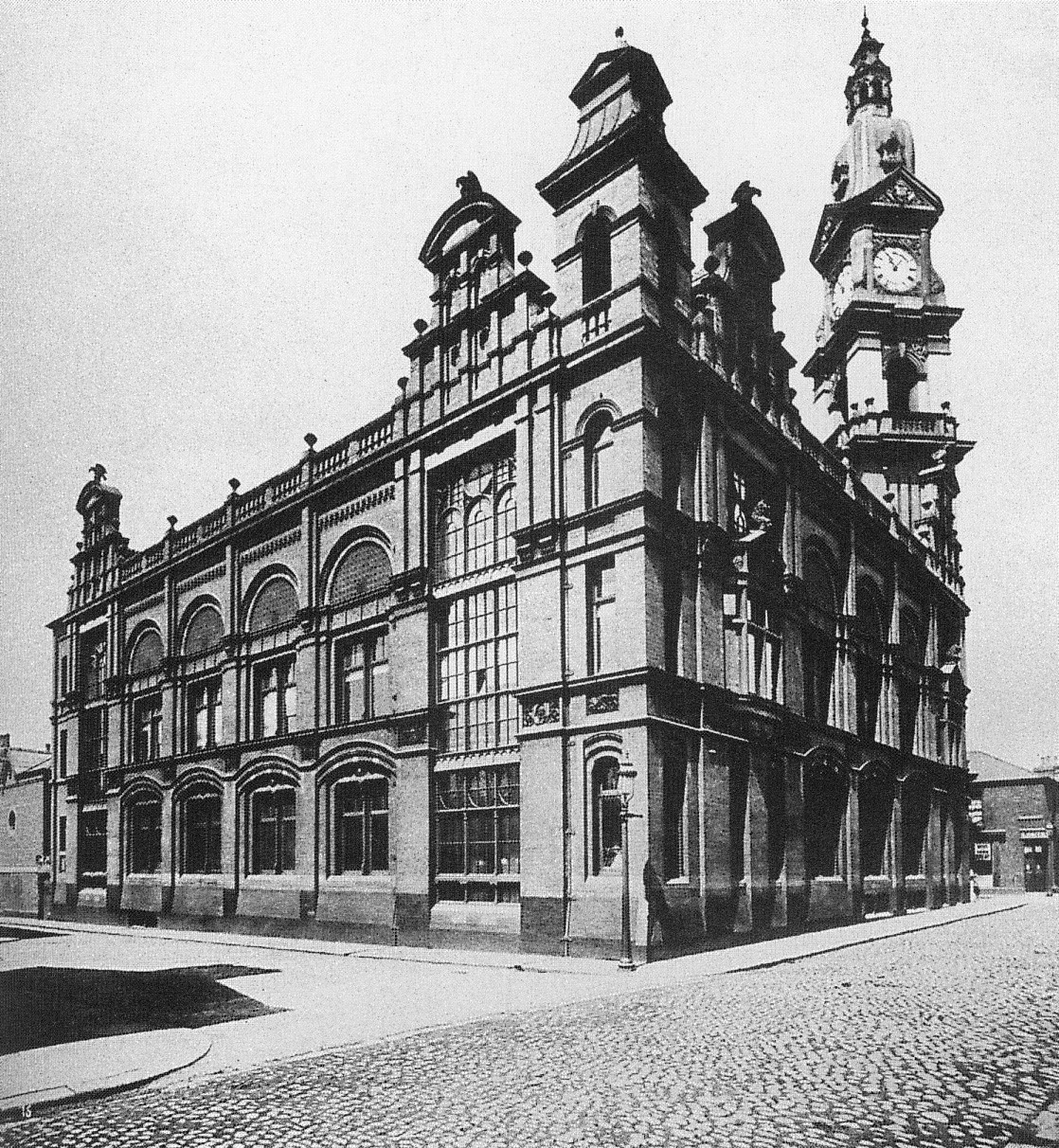
Beecham's Clock Tower, constructed in 1877 as part of the Beecham factory in St Helens

=== 19th century ===
In 1833, John Duncan and William Flockhart became partners in what grew into Duncan, Flockhart and Company and began manufacturing drugs in Edinburgh. In 1847, Flockhart supplied chloroform to Dr (later Sir) James Young Simpson for his anaesthesia experiment and it started to be used in obstetrics. It was exhibited in London in 1851, supplied to Florence Nightingale and given royal approval, and by 1895, to 750,000 doses per week in use. The firm grew but eventually merged into the Glaxo organisation.

In 1842 Thomas Beecham established the Beecham's Pills laxative business, which would later become the Beecham Group. By 1851 UK-based patent medicine companies had combined domestic revenues of around £250,000. Beecham opened Britain's first modern drugs factory in St Helens in 1859. Henry Wellcome and Silas Burroughs formed a partnership in September 1880, and established an office in Snow Hill in Central London. The London Wholesale Drug and Chemical Protection Society was formed in 1867, which became the Drug Club in 1891, the forerunner of the present-day Association of the British Pharmaceutical Industry. In 1883 Burroughs Wellcome & Co. opened their first factory, at Bell Lane Wharf in Wandsworth, utilising compressed medicine tablet-making machinery acquired from Wyeth of the United States. Burroughs Wellcome & Co. established its first overseas branch in Sydney in 1898.

The first UK trade association for the sector, the Drug Club, was founded in 1891. It was renamed the Association of the British Pharmaceutical Industry in 1948.

=== 20th century ===
The Glaxo department of Joseph Nathan and Co. was established in London in 1908. Glaxo Laboratories Ltd absorbed Joseph Nathan and Co in 1947 and was listed on the London Stock Exchange in the same year. To satisfy regulations then in place in the UK on the importation of medicines, Pfizer established a compounding operation in Folkestone, Kent in Autumn 1952. Pfizer acquired an 80-acre site on the outskirts of Sandwich in 1954 to enable the expansion of its Kent-based activities. Glaxo acquired Allen and Hanburys Ltd. in 1958. Glaxo acquired EPI which was the successor of Duncan, Flockhart and Company and Macfarlan Smith in 1962. In 1981 the bacterial infection treatment Augmentin (amoxicillin/clavulanate potassium) was launched by Beecham; the anti-ulcer treatment Zantac (ranitidine) was launched by Glaxo; and the antiviral herpes treatment Zovirax (aciclovir) was launched by Wellcome.

In 1991 SmithKline Beecham launched Seroxat/Paxil (paroxetine hydrochloride). In June 1993 Imperial Chemical Industries demerged its pharmaceuticals and agrochemicals businesses, forming Zeneca Group plc. In 1995 Glaxo opened a major research and development facility in Stevenage, constructed at a cost of £700 million. In March 1995 the £9 billion acquisition of Wellcome by Glaxo was completed, forming Glaxo Wellcome, in what was the largest merger in UK corporate history to date. BASF completed the acquisition of the pharmaceutical division of The Boots Company in April 1995. In 1997 SmithKline Beecham opened a major new research centre at New Frontiers Science Park in Harlow, Essex. In 1999 Zeneca Group plc and Sweden-based Astra AB merged to form AstraZeneca plc. Glaxo Wellcome and SmithKline Beecham announced their intention to merge in January 2000, with the merger completing in December of that year, forming GlaxoSmithKline plc.

=== 21st century ===
In February 2001 the Novartis Respiratory Research Centre, the largest single-site respiratory research centre in the world, opened in Horsham. In May 2006 AstraZeneca agreed to buy Cambridge Antibody Technology, then the largest UK-based biotechnology company, for £702 million. In April 2007 AstraZeneca agreed to acquire the U.S.-based biotechnology company MedImmune for $15.6 billion. In April 2009 GlaxoSmithKline agreed to acquire Stiefel Laboratories, then the world's largest independent dermatology company, for US$3.6 billion. In June 2009 Eisai opened a major new research and development and manufacturing facility in Hatfield, constructed at a cost of over £100 million. In November 2009 GlaxoSmithKline and Pfizer combined their respective AIDS divisions into one London-based company, ViiV Healthcare. On 1 February 2011 Pfizer announced that it would be closing its entire research and development facility at Sandwich, Kent within 18–24 months with the loss of 2,400 jobs, as part of a company-wide plan to reduce its spending on research and development.

In March 2013 AstraZeneca announced plans for a major corporate restructuring, including the closure of its research and development activities at Alderley Park, investment of $500 million in the construction of a new research and development facility in Cambridge, and the move of its corporate headquarters from London to Cambridge in 2016.

The amount of funding received by UK life science companies reached a 10-year high in 2014.

== Research and development ==
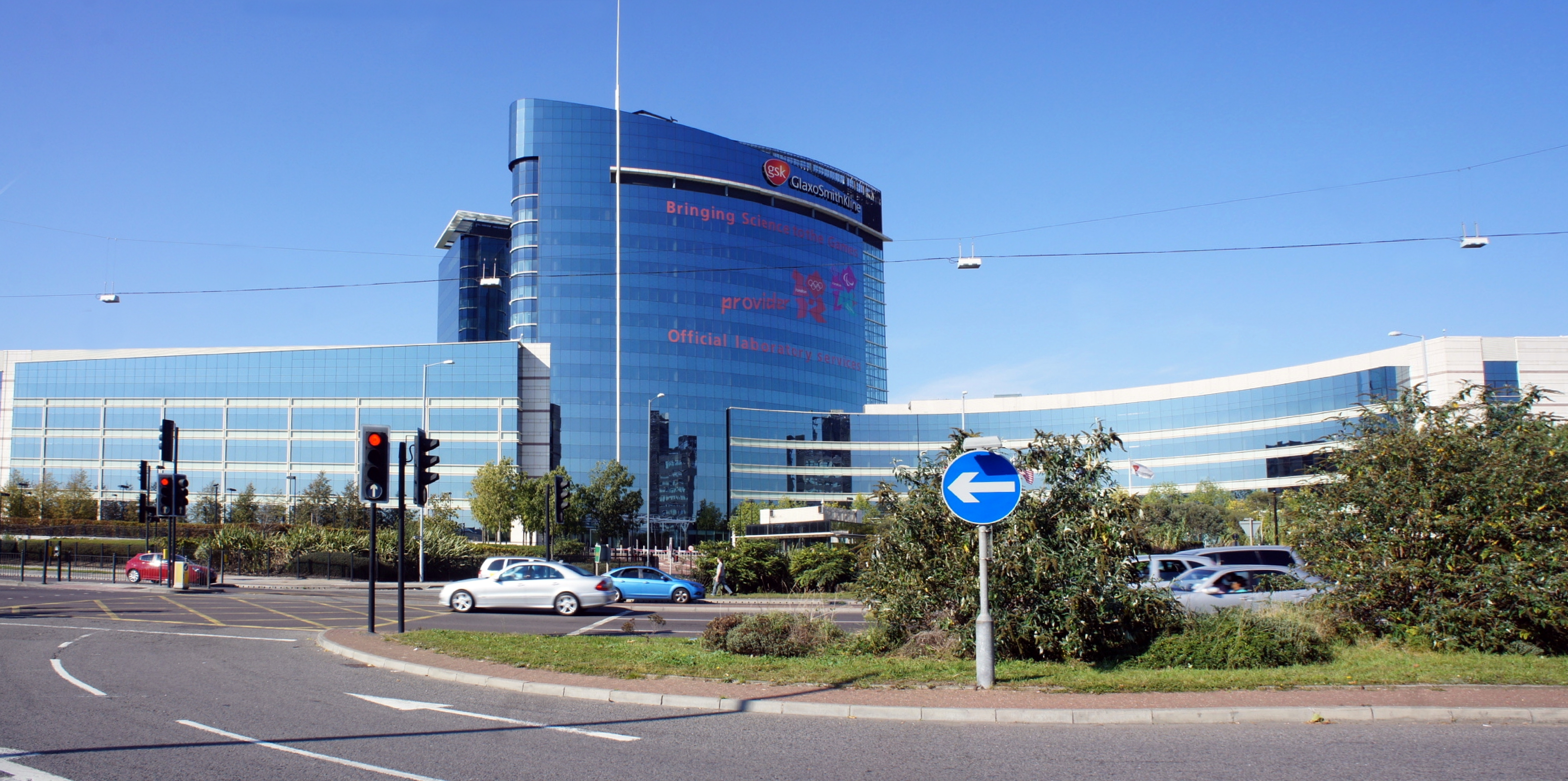
The world headquarters of GlaxoSmithKline in Brentford, London

In 2007 the UK had the third-highest share of global pharmaceutical Research and development (R&D) expenditure of any nation, with 9% of the total, behind the United States (49%) and Japan (15%). The UK has the largest pharmaceutical R&D expenditure of any European nation, accounting for 23% of the total; followed by France (20%), Germany (19%), and Switzerland (11%).

Top 25 UK investors in pharmaceuticals & biotechnology R&D - 2009/10
	Company^{a}	R&D spending^{b} (£m)
1	GlaxoSmithKline	3,629.00
2	AstraZeneca	2,745.68
3	Shire	346.71
4	Pfizer UK	325.66
5	Roche Products	208.44
6	Eisai Europe	151.13
7	Brinton Healthcare UK Ltd	140.13
8	Eli Lilly and Company	130.21
9	Amgen	127.06
10	Merial	102.42
11	Novartis Pharmaceuticals	90.27
12	John Wyeth & Brother	60.33
13	Bristol-Myers Squibb	55.49
14	Janssen	54.37
15	PowderMed	45.57
16	Aventis Pharma	44.92
17	Allergan	37.40
18	Organon Laboratories	36.78
19	Vectura	36.40
20	Antisoma	35.77
21	Boehringer Ingelheim	29.29
22	Genus	28.60
23	BTG	27.00
24	Servier R&D	25.10
25	Ipsen Developments	23.97
26	Renovo	18.07

Notes:

^{a} Italicised company name: ultimate parent is not UK-based

^{b} Where parent company is UK-based: worldwide R&D spending; other companies: R&D spending in UK only

== Regulation ==
The Medicines and Healthcare Products Regulatory Agency (MHRA) is the UK government agency which is responsible for ensuring that medicines and medical devices work and are acceptably safe.

The National Institute for Health and Care Excellence (NICE) is an executive non-departmental public body of the Department of Health and Social Care of the United Kingdom. It is responsible for judging the cost-effectiveness of medicines and making them available on the NHS through reimbursement, with its judgements informing decisions in Wales and Northern Ireland. It also provides a range of clinical guidance to the NHS in England and Wales, which are considered by Northern Ireland.

The Prescription Medicines Code of Practice Authority (PMCPA) is the self-regulatory body which administers the Association of the British Pharmaceutical Industry (ABPI) Code of Practice for the Pharmaceutical Industry, independently of the ABPI. The ABPI Code of Practice for the Pharmaceutical Industry is a self-regulatory code that sets standards for the ethical promotion of prescription medicines and for interactions between pharmaceutical companies and healthcare professionals, decision-makers, patient organisations and the public in the United Kingdom.

== Criticism and discussion ==
Global Justice Now and Stop AIDS Campaign published a report claiming patients could not always afford drugs where the public sector had partly funded research to develop those drugs. The report claims, "In many cases, the UK taxpayer effectively pays twice for medicines: first through investing in R&D, and then by paying high prices for the resulting medicine once ownership has been transferred to a private company." Richard Sullivan of King's College London, said some drug companies price their drugs correctly but others "vastly overprice" their drugs. There are calls for government action to discourage overpricing.

== See also ==
- Association of the British Pharmaceutical Industry
- Bad Pharma (2012) by Ben Goldacre
- List of pharmaceutical manufacturers in the United Kingdom
- List of pharmacy organizations in the United Kingdom
