= Chemist Direct =

UK-based company

- Industry: Healthcare
- Founded: 2007
- Headquarters: Oldbury & London, United Kingdom
- Key people: Mark Livingston: CEO

Chemist Direct is a UK-based company providing medical products and services in addition to beauty products online.

== History ==
2007–2013:

Founded in 2007 by Mitesh and Krishna Soma in Birmingham, the company attracted early investment—including around £3 million from Atomico—in 2009. In 2011, Stuart Rowe was appointed CEO, and by 2013 the company raised approximately $10 million from Atomico, Lepe Partners, and DMG Media to support rapid growth in online prescription, health advice, and pet medicines.

2016: Merger with Pharmacy2U

In July 2016, Chemist Direct merged with NHS repeat-prescription-focused Pharmacy2U in a deal worth over £40 million. The combined business claimed a customer base of 1.5 million and capacity to dispense up to 1 million prescription items per month. Mark Livingstone became CEO and Pharmacy2U founder Daniel Lee became COO.

2016-2020: Post-merger evolution

The merged entity scaled NHS repeat dispensing and clinician-led services. By May 2019, Pharmacy2U—now inclusive of Chemist Direct offerings—was dispensing over 500,000 medication items per month with more than 350,000 EPS-affiliated patients. Revenue rose from £25.8 m in 2017 to £43.2 m in 2018, despite posting losses around £16 m–£20 m. Chemist Direct continued to sell under its trade name.

2020-2023: Expansion

In 2023, Pharmacy2U acquired LloydsDirect, integrating it under a unified brand and combining strengths in digital prescription fulfillment and clinical care.

== Merger ==
In July 2016, it announced a merger with Pharmacy2U.
