= Medical Schools Council =

- Formation: 1947
- Headquarters: Woburn House; 20 Tavistock Square; London; WC1H 9HD
- Location: United Kingdom
- Website: www.medschools.ac.uk

The Medical Schools Council is an organisation that represents all undergraduate medical schools and one post graduate school in the United Kingdom. The membership is made up of the heads, or deans of the medical schools. It was formerly known as the Council of Heads of Medical Schools.

== History ==
The origins of the Medical Schools Council dates back to 1947, when the Conference of Deans of Provincial Medical Schools was formed. In 1989, this merged with the Conference of Deans of London Medical Schools, and in 2006 the organisation changed its name to the Medical Schools Council.

== Widening participation ==
The Medical Schools Council is involved in aiding medical schools improve access for applicants with a broader range of backgrounds. In the late nineties, the Medical Schools Council (then CHMS) looked at admission data and concluded that men and people from ethnic minorities were suffering from discrimination when they applied to medical schools. It was noted that the gender variation may "reflect the fact that girls are doing better academically than boys in school."

While men still currently outnumber women in the medical profession, the General Medical Council reported that the number of female doctors is continuously increasing. A 17% increase was also reported in the number of UK Graduate GPs who are Black and Minority Ethnic (BME).

Medical schools have been criticized for failing to enroll enough students from lower-income backgrounds with research showing that 80 per cent of applications to medicine came from only 20 per cent of schools. It was also found that approximately half of all applicants came from private or grammar schools. In 2008, after the Tooke inquiry into Modernising Medical Careers, the Council were again asked to look at selection of medical school applicants. Much of the Medical Schools Council's widening participation work was initiated as response to the 2012 report Fair Access to the Professions from the Child Poverty and Social Mobility Commission. This report stated that

"…medicine lags behind other professions both in the focus and in the priority it accords to these issues. It has a long way to go when it comes to making access fairer, diversifying its workforce and raising social mobility."

In July 2013 the "Selecting for Excellence" project began, which the Medical Schools Council had commissioned to widen participation in medicine and analyse the barriers for applicants from lower socioeconomic backgrounds. The report found that in the preceding three-year period, just under half of the schools and colleges in the UK did not provide any applicants to study medicine at British universities. The final report launched with 68 recommendations which are currently being implemented in December 2014. Medical schools were encouraged to do more to help disadvantaged students with their applications and preparations for admission tests.

In conjunction with National Association of Head Teachers (NAHT), the Medical Schools Council planned to organise for volunteers from the medical profession to visit pupils at the country's 18,000 primary schools during October 2015. The campaign was entitled "Who's in Heath?" and included the participation of the Chief Medical Officers of Scotland and Wales. However, there were some criticisms that primary children were too young to be introduced to medicine and instead the focus should be on the years closer to applying to university.

In 2024, the Medical Schools Council published its Fostering Potential Report, reflecting on the 10 years since the Selecting for Excellence project. It highlights that, over the previous ten years, the proportion of entrants into medical schools from the most deprived areas in the UK more than doubled from 6% to 14%, although the acceptance rate is still lower compared to applicants from more affluent areas. The number of applicants and entrants from areas with the least number of young people progressing to higher education has also more than doubled. The Selection Alliance was created, which comprises admissions deans, admissions tutors and outreach leads from each medical school, with the goal of widening participation to medicine. The Selection Alliance has received sustained support from NHS England and continues to identify areas for widening access to medicine. The Medical Schools Council's website details all UK medical schools' entry requirements as part of offering improved advice for applicants. The Medical Schools Council has committed to working with medical schools to ensure that all applicants have access to high quality advice. The Fostering Potential report sets out the areas that still need improvement, such as expanding outreach activity and widening participation programmes, creating more transparency around contextual admissions and continuing collaboration between medical schools to achieve these goals.

== Assessments ==
The Medical Schools Council plays a role in coordinating medical schools as they develop assessments. Much of the Council's assessment work is now carried out through MSC Assessment, formed in 2014.

=== Education Performance Measure and Situational Judgement Test ===
In 2010, the Medical Schools Council was commissioned by the UK Department of Health to lead an appraisal of approaches for selection of medical graduates into the UK Foundation Programme. After considering evidence the project group decided to pilot two new selection methods: Educational Performance Measure and a situational judgement test. The Educational Performance Measure (EPM) is a measure of clinical and non-clinical skills, knowledge and performance up to the point of application to the Foundation Programme. The Situational Judgement Test is a multiple-choice assessment of aptitude for employment and professional attributes as they relate to medicine. Following pilots, both Educational Performance Measure and Situational Judgement Test now form the entry into the Foundation Programme. Along with the UK Foundation Programme Office, the Medical Schools Council continues to administer the Situational Judgement Test through MSC Assessment. During the first use of the Situational Judgement Test for medical students in 2013, an error in the machine-marking process meant that all test papers had to be remarked by hand. Job offers were reissued and the Medical Schools Council apologised to affected medical students.

The Medical Schools Council stopped delivering the SJT and EPM from 2020. In June 2023 it was announced that allocation for the Foundation Programme 2024 onwards would use the new PIA allocation method.

=== Prescribing Safety Assessment ===
MSC Assessment, jointly with the British Pharmacological Society, developed the Prescribing Safety Assessment, originally called the Prescribing Skills Assessment. This is an assessment of the prescribing skills of final-year medical students with the intention that it 'allows all students to demonstrate their competencies in relation to the safe and effective use of medicines'.

It was initiated as a response to a General Medical Council sponsored study in 2009 which found that 9% of hospital prescriptions contain errors. The assessment was developed and piloted from 2011 to 2013, with further drive added to the initiative by a 2014 General Medical Council report which surveyed newly graduated doctors and found that prescribing was consistently the area they found most challenging. The assessment is now becoming part of the final year landscape in publicly funded UK medical schools. In 2016, the Prescribing Safety Assessment was shortlisted at the BMJ Awards for "Education Team of the Year".

== Other projects ==
=== Clinical Academia ===
The Medical Schools Council works to promote clinical academic careers i.e. for those doctors who are employed by universities and undertake teaching and research alongside their clinical commitments. This is vital to maintain the standard of medical research in the UK. In cooperation with the Dental Schools Council, the Medical Schools Council has produced a survey of clinical academic staffing levels in UK medical and dental schools since 2000, producing the reports annually since 2003. The two councils launched the Clinical Academic Jobs website in 2008 as a means for universities to advertise specialist clinical academic roles.

=== Medical Licensing Assessment ===
Since 2025, the Medical Schools Council, in partnership with medical schools and the General Medical Council, coordinates the development and delivery of the Applied Knowledge test (AKT) for UK medical students, which forms part of the Medical Licensing Assessment (MLA).

=== Student Fitness to Practise ===
The Medical Schools Council regularly works with the General Medical Council to develop guidance for medical schools on how to run robust and fair fitness to practise processes. Fitness to practise procedures are the mechanism through which medical schools address concerns about a student's professionalism rather than their academic performance. The Medical Schools Council also works with the General Medical Council to develop advice to students as to how they can ensure that they behave professionally whilst at medical school and maintain the trust that the population as a whole has in doctors.

== Medical school culture ==
Data analysed by the House of Commons library has shown that demand for General Practitioners in the UK is increasing, while the number of actual GP's is drastically falling. The British Medical Association has said that GP surgeries are at "breaking point." In October 2014, Maureen Baker, Chair of the Royal College of General Practitioners (RCGP) announced that she was to attend a meeting with the Medical Schools Council, to look at why some medical schools appeared to have a 'toxic anti-GP culture'. To combat this, the Medical Schools Council is working with the RCGP to promote general practice careers and said that its members have made a "commitment to articulate the importance of general practice to students."

== Governance ==
The membership of the Medical Schools Council consists of UK medical schools. The Council has 42 members, of which 41 represent undergraduate medical schools and one represents a post-graduate only medical school. The chief executive is Katie Petty-Saphon. The current co-chairs, appointed in August 2019, are Professor John Atherton, Pro Vice Chancellor and Dean of the Faculty of Medicine and Health Sciences, University of Nottingham School of Medicine and Professor Malcolm Reed, Dean of Brighton and Sussex Medical School.

It has headquarters in Woburn House, London. Each medical school pays a yearly subscription to be part of the Medical Schools Council. In 2015 it had an income of around £1 million.

In 2015, it took part in a review, along with Dental Schools Council to try to improve equality and diversity across its own organisation.
