= R (on the application of Pitt and Tyas) v General Pharmaceutical Council =

UK legal ruling concerning standards for pharmacy professionals

R (on the application of Pitt and Tyas) v General Pharmaceutical Council was a 2017 decision of the High Court of Justice in its Queen's Bench Division.

In 2017, the General Pharmaceutical Council (GPhC) renamed its "Standards of Conduct, Ethics and Performance", which set standards for those it regulates, to "Standards for Pharmacy Professionals". At the same time, it changed the standards to include for the first time the express provision that "The standards need to be met at all times, not only during working hours." Two pharmacists, Pitt and Tyas, who were employees of the Pharmacists' Defence Association, initiated judicial review proceedings on the basis that – they alleged – the standards infringed their human rights as set out in Articles 8 (the right to private and family life), 10 (freedom of expression) and 11 (freedom of association) of the European Convention on Human Rights, as given effect in UK law through Sch. 1 to the Human Rights Act 1998. The challenge was not successful.

Alongside the implications for pharmacists, the judgement may have significant implications relating to the extent to which regulators may in the future impose requirements on the private lives of members of regulated professions and occupations. It provides commentary on the extent to which it is possible – if at all – to separate professional/working life from personal life.
