= Pharmacy2U =

Online pharmacy located in the UK

- Company type: Online pharmacy
- Industry: Pharmaceutical
- Founded: 1999
- Founder: Daniel Lee
- Headquarters: Thorpe Park, Leeds, England
- Area served: United Kingdom (prescriptions)
- Key people: Kevin Heath; (CEO); Gary Dannat; (Chief of Staff); Ana Ciubotaru; (COO); Scott Fawcett; (CFO)
- Products: NHS repeat prescriptions service
- Website: www.pharmacy2u.co.uk

Pharmacy2U is a British online pharmacy company, which manages NHS repeat prescriptions on behalf of patients.

== History ==
Pharmacy2U was founded by pharmacist Daniel Lee in November 1999, and launched to the public in June 2000.

The British Medical Association initially had concerns about the use of internet prescribing and wanted to know more about Pharmacy2U's service. The chairman of the BMA's prescribing committee, George Rae, said "I would advise against getting private prescriptions over the internet because the patient's GP is not involved". By July 2000, the council of the Royal Pharmaceutical Society had established the standards of professional practice for those who wished to provide pharmaceutical services via the internet. By August 2000, Pharmacy2U was one of the founding members of the European Association of Mail Service Pharmacies.

Pharmacy2U was involved in the first pilots to trial the electronic transfer of prescriptions (EPS) which went live in June 2002. With EPS, patients could request prescriptions electronically, and receive their medication by a postal delivery rather than picking it up in person.

By 2003, Pharmacy2U had incorporated 142 surgeries into its program.

In October 2015, Pharmacy2U were fined £130,000 by the Information Commissioner's Office for selling the names and addresses of patients without their permission. A spokesman apologised and said that Pharmacy2U would no longer sell patient data.

During the opening of their £3.5 million Leeds-based dispensary in 2015, Pharmacy2U stopped providing medication for several weeks due to a failure in their automated dispensing system. A Pharmacy2U spokesman apologised, saying that "unforeseen difficulties" had led to "unexpected delays for some orders".

In January 2016, Pharmacy2U merged with ChemistDirect.co.uk who specialise in over-the-counter remedies. ChemistDirect.co.uk's Mark Livingstone took on the role of CEO for the newly formed group with Daniel Lee moving to chief pharmacy officer.

In July 2017, Pharmacy2U's direct mail was criticised for leaving patients confused about their repeat prescriptions.

The company was in a legal dispute in late 2018 over the rights of the contact details of members of the National Pharmacy Association. The presiding judge expressed concerns over the company's ability to "pick off" individual members.

As of May 2019, Pharmacy2U has over 350,000 nominated EPS patients. In November 2019, Pharmacy2U dispensed over 621,128 prescription items. Pharmacy2U was named no.91 in 2019's Sunday Times Tech Track 100.

The company made a loss of £16 million in 2018/19, although it added 330,000 new NHS patients and dispensed more than 5.3 million NHS prescriptions.

In 2020, Pharmacy2U opened a dispensary in Leicester, almost completely automated and capable of dispensing up to 6.5 million prescription items a month.

In March 2021, it was reported that Pharmacy2U was exploring a potential sale to a new private equity backer.

Pharmacy2U acquired the LloydsDirect business from LloydsPharmacy in October 2023 for an undisclosed sum.
