= List of dental schools in the United Kingdom =

This list of dental schools in the United Kingdom includes all eighteen Dental Schools or Schools of Medicine and Dentistry in the United Kingdom which are recognised by the General Dental Council and lead to a dental degree of a UK university. There are twelve such schools in England, four in Scotland, one in Wales and one in Northern Ireland. The list is ordered by country and name, and includes the founding date of the Dental School or its parent/associated Medical School. The Dental Schools Council represents the interests of all UK Dental Schools.

== England ==
Name	University	Established	Comments	Ref.
Barts and The London, School of Medicine and Dentistry	Queen Mary University of London	1995	Formed by the merger of the London Hospital Medical College and St Bartholomew's Hospital Medical College.	
School of Dentistry	Birmingham	1828	Merged with Mason Science College in 1900.	
Bristol Dental School	Bristol	1833		
School of Dentistry, University of Central Lancashire	University of Central Lancashire	1842	Teaching of dentistry began in 2007. Curriculum as University of Liverpool leading to a University of Lancashire Degree. Also teaches Postgraduate Dentistry courses leading to diplomas, Masters and PhD in dentistry.	
Guy's, King's & St Thomas's Dental Institute	King's College London	1799	Earliest dental education at Guy's Hospital predates foundation of King's College London. The United Medical and Dental Schools of Guy's and St Thomas' Hospitals merged eventually with King's in 1998. Known as GKT School of Medicine & Dental Institute until 2005. Dental Institute became a separate faculty at King's in 2014.	
Leeds Dental Institute	Leeds	1904	All undergraduate students qualify with an "MChd/BChd Dental Surgery, Bsc Oral Science" at the end of the five-year programme. It is the only UK dental school to offer this integrated undergraduate master's degree. The school is also unique in beginning clinical experience with patients in the first year of the dental course.	
Liverpool Dental School	Liverpool	1834		
Manchester Dental School	Manchester	1874	Formed from the School of Anatomy at Manchester Royal Infirmary, which opened in 1814.	
Newcastle University Dental School	Newcastle	1834		
Peninsula College of Medicine and Dentistry	Exeter; Plymouth	2000	Run jointly by the University of Exeter and Plymouth University.	
Sheffield School of Clinical Dentistry	Sheffield	1828	Affiliated with the Royal Hallamshire Hospital.	
UCL Eastman Dental Institute	University College London	1948	Merged with University College London in 1999. Shares site and facilities with Eastman Dental Hospital.	

=== Schools offering only DCP and postgraduate education ===
- University of Portsmouth Dental Academy. Opened in 2005 and offers three programmes of study:
  - Foundation Award in Science and Dental Therapy
  - BSc (Hons) Dental Hygiene and Dental Therapy
  - CertHE Dental Nursing
- University of Essex
  - BSc Oral Health Sciences
  - MSc Advanced Periodontal Practice (Dental Care Professional)
  - MSc Periodontology (Dentists)
- University of Suffolk (under planning, not yet opened)

== Scotland ==
Name	University	Established	Comments	Ref.
University of Aberdeen School of Dentistry	Aberdeen	1497	Scotland's newest dental school	
University of Dundee Dental School	Dundee	1967	From 1899 to 1967 dentistry taught in Dundee which was at that time part of the University of St Andrews	
Edinburgh Dental Institute	Edinburgh	1860	BSc(Hons) in hygiene and therapy alongside a wide range of short, distance learning and extended postgraduate training courses across the dental specialties.	
Glasgow Dental School	Glasgow	1451	Dentistry first taught in 1637.	

== Wales ==
Name	University	Established	Comments	Ref.
Cardiff University Dental School	Cardiff	1931	Previously known as the Welsh National School of Medicine and the University of Wales College of Medicine.	

== Northern Ireland ==
Name	University	Established	Ref.
Queen's University Belfast School of Dentistry	Queen's University Belfast	1921	

== See also ==
- List of pharmacy schools in the United Kingdom
- List of medical schools in the United Kingdom
- Medical school in the United Kingdom
- Medical education in the United Kingdom
