= Pharmaceutical Society of Ireland =

Statutory and professional body

The Pharmaceutical Society of Ireland (PSI) is the statutory and professional body responsible for regulation of pharmacists and community pharmacies in Ireland. It is also responsible for overseeing the training of new pharmacists. Registration with PSI is essential in order to practice as a pharmacist or operate a pharmacy in Ireland.

== History ==
Pharmacy Act (Ireland) 1875 (Note: Section 1.)
- Act of Parliament
- Parliament of the United Kingdom
- Long title: An Act to institute a Pharmaceutical Society, and to regulate the Qualifications of Pharmaceutical Chemists and of Chemists and Druggists, in Ireland.
- Citation: 38 & 39 Vict. c. 57
- Territorial extent: Ireland (Note: Section 2.)

Dates
- Royal assent: 11 August 1875
- Commencement: 11 August 1875 (Note: The Acts of Parliament (Commencement) Act 1793.)
- Repealed: 21 December 1954
Other legislation
Repealed by	Statute Law Revision Act 1883; Pharmacy Act (Ireland) 1875 Amendment Act 1890; Statute Law Revision Act 1894; Statute Law Revision Act (Northern Ireland) 1954

Status: Repealed

Text of statute as originally enacted

The Pharmaceutical Society of Ireland was created by the Pharmacy Act (Ireland) 1875 (38 & 39 Vict. c. 57), which introduced regulation of pharmacists across the island. A separate Pharmaceutical Society of Northern Ireland was created by the Pharmacy and Poisons Act (Northern Ireland) 1925 (15 & 16 Geo. 5 (NI). c. 8 (N.I.)).

== Functions ==
The Pharmaceutical Society of Ireland (PSI) regulates the pharmacy profession in the public interest. Inspection is an important part of this task. The PSI employs inspectors to inspect pharmacies and, where necessary, to secure evidence of contravention of legislation controlling the supply of poisons and controlled preparations.

The Education Unit of the PSI oversees the undergraduate education and pre-registration training of pharmacy students in the Irish schools of pharmacy at University College Cork, Trinity College, Dublin and Royal College of Surgeons in Ireland, to prepare them for registration as pharmacists.

The society publishes the Irish Pharmacy Journal (IPJ), the official journal of the Society.

== Governance ==
Up to April 2007 the PSI's governing Council was elected solely by members of the society. The Pharmacy Act 2007 reformed the society so that now 9 members of the council are elected by members of the society and the balance are appointed by the Minister for Health and Children to represent various sections of the public and health community. At the first meeting of the Council of the new Pharmaceutical Society of Ireland in June 2007, Portumna pharmacist Mr Brendan Hayes was elected president and Lismore pharmacist Dr Bernard Leddy was elected vice president.

Members are often called M.P.S.I (Member of PSI) and it is an offence for people to describe themselves as such if they are not qualified to do so under the Pharmacy Act 2007.
