= Dental Schools Council =

Irish and UK council

The Dental Schools Council represents the interests of Irish and UK dental schools as it relates to national health, wealth, knowledge acquisition through teaching, research, and the profession of dentistry. Composed of the Dean or equivalent of each dental school in the UK and Ireland, the current chair is Professor Chris Deery, Dean, School of Clinical Dentistry at the University of Sheffield. The Dental Schools Council meet three times per year in February, June and October.

== The Dental Schools Council History ==
The Dental Schools Council began life as the Education Consultative Committee of the Dental Schools of Great Britain on 31 January 1931 when Mr W. Malcolm Knott (President of the British Dental Association in 1930) invited several Dental Deans to come together to discuss the formation of a Dental School Committee to discuss all matters relating to dental education. Twelve dental schools were represented at the first meeting, with each member donating one guinea to cover expenses. The first topic discussed was the recommendation of a General Medical Council to maintain dental standards in the United Kingdom. The Education Consultative Committee of the Dental Schools of Great Britain enabled the university staff to play a greater role in determining, co-ordinating and agreeing standards in the dental curriculum.

== Previous names ==
The Dental Schools Council has been referred to under many names since its formation. In 1932, a formal constitution was approved resulting in a new name - The Dental Education Advisory Committee of Great Britain and Ireland, which was later changed in 1937 to the Dental Education Advisory Council of Great Britain and Ireland (DEAC). In order to align itself with the Council of Heads of Medical Schools - now the Medical Schools Council - the DEAC changed its name in 1993 to the Council of Deans of Dental Schools (CDDS). However, it was later decided in 2005 that it was necessary to change the name to Council of Heads and Deans of Dental Schools to reflect that not all members of the organisation were given the title ‘Dean’. 2008 saw a final name change to the Dental Schools Council to reflect the levels within the dental schools, from not only the Heads and Deans but also other staff members including admissions tutors, administrators and students themselves.

== Senior Officers Group ==
In 2007, the Dental Schools Senior Officers Group was convened, fostering formal and regular dialogue on key issues between Dental Schools across the UK at Senior Administrator Level. The Senior Officers Group meet twice a year in February and October (as a joint meeting with the Dental Schools Council). The current Chair is Anna Burrows, Senior Administrator at the University of Sheffield School of Clinical Dentistry.

== Members ==
The Dental School Council consists of the 18 dental schools in the UK and 2 in Ireland. These are:

- School of Medicine and Dentistry, University of Aberdeen
- Barts and The London School of Medicine and Dentistry
- The School of Dentistry, University of Birmingham
- Bristol Dental School, University of Bristol
- School of Dentistry, Cardiff University
- Cork University Dental School and Hospital, University College Cork
- Dundee Dental School, University of Dundee
- Edinburgh Postgraduate Dental Institute
- Glasgow Dental Hospital and School
- King's College London Dental Institute
- Leeds Dental Institute
- The University of Liverpool School of Dentistry
- School of Dentistry, University of Manchester
- The School of Dental Sciences, University of Newcastle upon Tyne
- Peninsula Dental School, Peninsula College of Medicine and Dentistry
- The School of Dentistry, Queen's University of Belfast
- The School of Clinical Dentistry, University of Sheffield
- School of Dental Science, Trinity College Dublin
- School of Dentistry, University of Central Lancashire
- UCL Eastman Dental Institute

== Associated organisations ==
The Dental Schools Council promotes dental education and research through collaboration with:

- Universities UK
- Higher Education Funding Bodies
- National Health Service
- Government Departments
- General Dental Council
- Academy of Medical Royal Colleges
- Research Councils
- Dental research charities
- Association of Medical Research Charities
- Medical Schools Council
- Association of UK University Hospitals
- British Dental Association
