= Dispensing Doctors' Association =

The Dispensing Doctors' Association is an organisation for rural general practitioners in the United Kingdom, based in Kirkbymoorside.

It was first established in 1984, following the publication of Cecil Clothier's Report on dispensing arrangements in rural areas in December 1977 and the publication of the NHS (General Medical and Pharmaceutical Services) Amendment Regulations 1983, SI 1983/313. In 2022 Dr Richard West, a GP partner in Suffolk was chair of the association.

It campaigns to protect the right of GPs to dispense prescriptions in rural areas. There are about 6600 doctors in 1,290 dispensing practices affected with about three million patients who qualify as being more than a mile from a pharmacy. There was a 16% reduction in dispensing practices in Scotland from 2011 to 2013. The association points out that revenue that practices receive from providing dispensing services subsidise the provision of general medical services in rural areas.

The Association recommended in 2014 that pharmacists should assume responsibility for patients with hypertension who are prescribed three drugs or fewer and are controlled.

It produced a manifesto for the 2017 General Election calling for protection of rural general practice.

== See also ==
- Separation of prescribing and dispensing
