= National Pharmacy Association =

British industry trade association

- Abbreviation: NPA
- Formation: 1921
- Legal status: Non-profit company
- Purpose: Support community pharmacies
- Location: Mallinson House, 38-42 St Peters Street, St Albans, AL1 3NP
- Region served: UK
- Members: Community pharmacy owners
- Chief Executive: Henry Gregg
- Board of directors: Olivier Picard, Chairperson
- Website: www.npa.co.uk

The National Pharmacy Association is a British industry trade association for independent Community Pharmacy established in 1921.

== History ==
The NPA's origins can be traced to 1921, when the Retail Pharmacists' Union (RPU) was founded as a body to respond to a need of representation for pharmacists in employment matters and regulate industry prices. George A. Mallinson was appointed as the RPU's first Secretary (giving his name to the NPA's current headquarters, Mallinson House, a listed building in St Albans, Hertfordshire).

In 1932 the Retail Pharmacists' Union (RPU) was renamed the National Pharmaceutical Union (NPU) with a membership of 90% of retail chemists. Following the establishment of the National Health Service (NHS) in 1948, the NPU established itself on a number of key government committees. One committee, the National Health Insurance Committee (1947), became the Pharmaceutical Services Negotiating Committee (PSNC), which continues to operate as a notable industry organisation to this day.

In 1977 the NPU was renamed The National Pharmacy Association (NPA) and in 1978 it moved to its current headquarters. 1983 saw the NPA launch the 'Ask Your Pharmacist' campaign, a tradition that continues to this day promoting the work of pharmacy year-round, culminating in 'Ask Your Pharmacist Week'.

== Function ==
The NPA describes itself as there to "help independent pharmacies to prosper, professionally and commercially, for the benefit ultimately of the patients and communities they serve".

The NPA's core functions are to offer insurance and legal service and business and practice advice and act as the representative voice of the sector to government and regulatory bodies. Additional roles are updating members on recent developments in the sector, new drugs coming to market, and offering training and education. It also mediates with the NHS on behalf of its members, and offers Patient Group Directions.

The NPA is officially designated as the Medication Safety Officer for all independent community pharmacies in England with fewer than 50 branches. In this role the NPA shares good practice in relation to medicines safety and acts as an interface with the Department of Health and Social Care on this matter.

=== Criticism of online pharmacies ===
The NPA have been critical of the British Government's push for increased online pharmacy services citing that more online pharmacies would result in "fewer pharmacies for the public to visit". A 2017 survey commissioned by the NPA found that 69% of respondents are against a "shift away from local pharmacies" towards online-only pharmacies such as Pharmacy2U or Chemist 4 U.

== Structure ==
The NPA is a not-for-profit organisation, and any surplus is invested in member services.

The Association is governed by a Board made up of owners of independent pharmacies from across the UK. Mark Lyonette became Chief Executive in June 2018.
