= Pharmaceutical Society of Northern Ireland =

Northern Irish regulatory and professional body

The Pharmaceutical Society of Northern Ireland (PSNI) is the regulatory and professional body for pharmacy in Northern Ireland.

As the regulatory body, it seeks to protect public safety in pharmacy by:

- setting and promoting standards for pharmacists' admission to the register and for remaining on the register;
- maintaining a publicly accessible register of pharmacists, and pharmacy premises, in Northern Ireland;
- handling concerns about the Fitness to Practise of registrants and taking any necessary action to protect the public; and
- ensuring high standards of education and training for pharmacists in Northern Ireland

As the professional body, it seeks to develop the pharmacy profession in Northern Ireland in the public interest.

== History ==
Pharmacy and Poisons Act (Northern Ireland) 1925
- Act of Parliament
- Parliament of Northern Ireland
- Long title: An Act to establish a Pharmaceutical Society of Northern Ireland; to regulate the qualifications and provide for the annual licensing of Pharmaceutical Chemists, Chemists and Druggists and Druggists in Northern Ireland; to amend and extend the law with respect to the sale of poisons; and for other purposes incidental thereto.
- Citation: 15 & 16 Geo. 5. c. 8 (N.I.)
- Territorial extent: Northern Ireland

Dates
- Royal assent: 9 June 1925

Other legislation
- Amended by: Medicines Act 1968

The Pharmaceutical Society of Northern Ireland was created in 1925 by the Pharmacy and Poisons Act (Northern Ireland) 1925 (15 & 16 Geo. 5. c. 8 (N.I.)). Before that point, pharmacists had been regulated on an all-island basis by the Pharmaceutical Society of Ireland under the Pharmacy Act (Ireland) 1875 (38 & 39 Vict. c. 57).

== Oversight of health and social care regulators ==
The Professional Standards Authority for Health and Social Care (PSA), is an independent body accountable to the UK Parliament, which promotes the health and wellbeing of the public and oversees the nine UK healthcare regulators, including Pharmaceutical Society of Northern Ireland.

== See also ==
- Pharmaceutical industry in the United Kingdom
- List of pharmacy organizations in the United Kingdom
