= Pharmacists' Defence Association =

UK insurance company

- Pharmacists' Defence Association Logo
- Headquarters: The Old Fire Station, 69 Albion Street, Birmingham B1 3EA, United Kingdom
- Area served: United Kingdom
- Key people: Mark Koziol (Chairman) Paul Day (Director); Mark Pitt (Director of Defence Services)
- Services: Legal defence Professional indemnity insurance Professional advice Pharmacy agenda influence Trade Union; Equality network
- Members: ▲38,024 (2024)
- Website: the-pda.org

The Pharmacists' Defence Association is a not-for-profit membership organisation that exists to safeguard, maintain the honour, and promote the interests of pharmacists in their exercise of the profession of pharmacy. It has individual pharmacists, pharmacy students and trainee pharmacists in membership in the United Kingdom and Crown Dependencies.

Membership of the PDA includes insurance, defence association benefits, and trade union membership which all aim to assist and support pharmacists in their working lives.

In June 2026, the PDA reported having more than 40,500 members in the United Kingdom.

The National Association of Women Pharmacists (founded in 1905) became a semi-autonomous network within the association in 2019 and the PDA subsequently launched the LGBT+ Pharmacists network, BAME Pharmacists network and the Ability Network for pharmacists with a disability.

== The PDA Union ==
The PDA Union is an independent trade union. that runs parallel to the PDA and has its own democratic structure and rules. The union exists to give pharmacists an independent voice at work.

In 2024 members of the Boots Pharmacists Association (BPA), founded in 1973, voted to transfer their engagements into the PDA Union and the unions merged on 1 January 2025, making the PDA Union the only trade union exclusively for pharmacists in the UK.

== Safer Pharmacies Charter ==
The Safer Pharmacies Charter was produced by PDA members and consists of seven commitments to improve patient safety through better working conditions for pharmacists.

== Elizabeth Lee ==
Elizabeth Lee was a pharmacist who was given a 3-month suspended prison sentence for an inadvertent dispensing error at a Tesco pharmacy in 2007, reduced to a £300 fine on appeal in 2010. Her case received national media attention and was the catalyst of a substantial national effort in the UK to decriminalize inadvertent dispensing errors. She was defended by the Pharmacists' Defence Association between 2007 and 2010. The case has been used since that time in pharmacy education as an aid to explain the legislation applicable to the supply of medicines by pharmacists in the UK.

== Pharmacist independent prescribers ==
In 2019 the association issued urgent guidance to its members after several serious incidents, including fatalities, involving pharmacist independent prescribers working in GP practices prescribing inappropriately or offering poor advice. They were particularly concerned about prescribing and clinical advice for patients who were not physically present, or without reference to clinical records and for walk-in patients where a diagnosis might be needed. They were also concerned about employers in online pharmacies expecting prescription of high-risk medicines, like controlled drugs, without reference to the patient’s GP.

== See also ==
- List of pharmacy organisations in the United Kingdom
