= UK Clinical Pharmacy Association =

The United Kingdom Clinical Pharmacy Association (UKCPA) is a non-profit organisation which actively develops clinical pharmacy practice in medicines management.

== History ==
The organisation was founded in Leicester in 1981 in response to a need to drive clinical pharmacy practice forward in the UK. The organisation is currently focused on supporting and encouraging excellence, leadership, and partnership within clinical pharmacy.

== Functions ==
The UKCPA supports pharmacy practitioners to develop and deliver clinical pharmacy.

The organisation provides the infrastructure to enable pharmacy practitioner peers to deliver professional education and training across a diverse range of practice interest areas (e.g. infection management, anticoagulation, diabetes/endocrinology, pain management, GP practice, critical care, etc). The UKCPA is organised to build and support communities of practice around interest areas - practitioners can talk to each other on a daily basis in order to solve individual clinical problems or create systems, methods and guidelines to deal with clinical scenarios on a local, regional or even national basis.

The UKCPA holds education and training events throughout the UK. The content is provided by coal face clinical practitioners and targeted at various levels of practice, from beginners to expert. The events are accredited by the Royal Pharmaceutical Society. Peer-reviewed research posters are displayed at annual conference.

The UKCPA draws on its membership to provide expertise on the use of medicines to national organisations such as NICE, the Department of Health the MHRA, and other professional organisations.

Expert members are involved in developing professional curricula for workforce development, developing assessment of advanced practice, and are assessors for the Royal Pharmaceutical Society Faculty. The UKCPA is a partner of the Royal Pharmaceutical Society, the professional body for the pharmacy profession in England, Wales and Scotland.

The UKCPA provides a research grant to support its members to develop their research skills. This grant is provided in partnership with Pharmacy Research UK.

== Membership ==
The UKCPA currently has more than 2,500 members in the UK and overseas from all areas of the profession including hospital, community, academia, and industry, as well as pharmacists and pharmacy technicians working at the interface between primary and secondary care.

== Structure ==
The UKCPA is largely run by volunteers – the practitioners themselves. Most UKCPA officers (chair, vice-chair and treasurer) are working pharmacy practitioners. The general secretary and general manager are employed by UKCPA. The general committee makes strategic and financial decisions on behalf of the membership. The business management group makes executive decisions and approves expenditure in consultation with the general committee.

The UKCPA head office is in Leicester where the general manager and administrative team are based.

== Interest groups ==
- Cardiology
- Care of the Elderly
- Community
- Critical Care
- Diabetes and Endocrinology
- Education and Training
- Emergency Care
- Foundation Pharmacists
- Gastroenterology and Hepatology
- GP Practice Pharmacists
- Haemostasis, Anticoagulation and Thrombosis
- Independent Prescribing
- Information Technology
- Medicines Safety and Quality
- Neurosciences
- Pain Management
- Pharmacy Infection Network
- Respiratory
- Rheumatology and Dermatology
- Surgery and Theatres
- Women's Health
