= Stop AIDS Campaign =

British public health campaign

STOPAIDS
- Type: NGO
- Headquarters: London
- Director: Mike Podmore
- Website: https://stopaids.org.uk

STOPAIDS is a UK-based HIV, health and rights network. Drawing on its 35-year experience working on the HIV response, it supports UK and global movements to challenge systemic barriers and inequalities to end AIDS and support people around the world to realise their right to good health and wellbeing.

== History ==
It is a coalition of more than eighty of the leading international NGOs and HIV/AIDS groups in the United Kingdom. The Stop AIDS Campaign is the previous name of a campaign run by the UK Consortium on AIDS and International Development. The Stop AIDS Campaign and the AIDS Consortium relaunched as STOPAIDS, in September 2013.

Members of the network include Christian Aid, CAFOD, the International HIV/AIDS Alliance, OXFAM, UNICEF UK, Restless Development (hosts of the Youth STOPAIDS Campaign) and Oxfam. The network continues to campaign, to increase access to prevention, treatment, care and support services for HIV and AIDS.

== Related groups ==
- Student Stop AIDS Campaign
