= Pharmaceutical Services Negotiating Committee =

British organisation

The Pharmaceutical Services Negotiating Committee (PSNC) is recognised by the UK Secretary of State for Health as representative of community pharmacy on National Health Service matters. The PSNC's main objective is to secure the best possible remuneration, terms and conditions for NHS pharmacy contractors in England. Much of the PSNC’s work involves discussions and negotiations with the Department of Health. Community Pharmacy Wales is a related organisation. Most of the English national pharmacy contract negotiated by PSNC has been adopted by the Welsh Assembly Government, but Community Pharmacy Wales has negotiated some local variation.

PSNC also operates a prescription pricing auditing function: A percentage of all prescriptions sent to NHS Prescription Services are checked and any errors in pricing are corrected.

PSNC community pharmacy members run a web based system called PharmOutcomes which provides a system for provision, invoicing and management of any locally commissioned services. PharmOutcomes is run by Pinnacle Health LLP. The e-referral scheme, developed by the Newcastle upon Tyne Hospitals NHS Foundation Trust and the North of the Tyne Local Pharmaceutical Committee, based on PharmOutcomes, won an award from the Health Service Journal in 2015. The system generates a referral from the hospital pharmacy to a community pharmacist when a patient is discharged from hospital. They carry out a consultation and medicine use review, within three days, feeding the details back to the hospital.
