= Pharmacist =

Healthcare professional

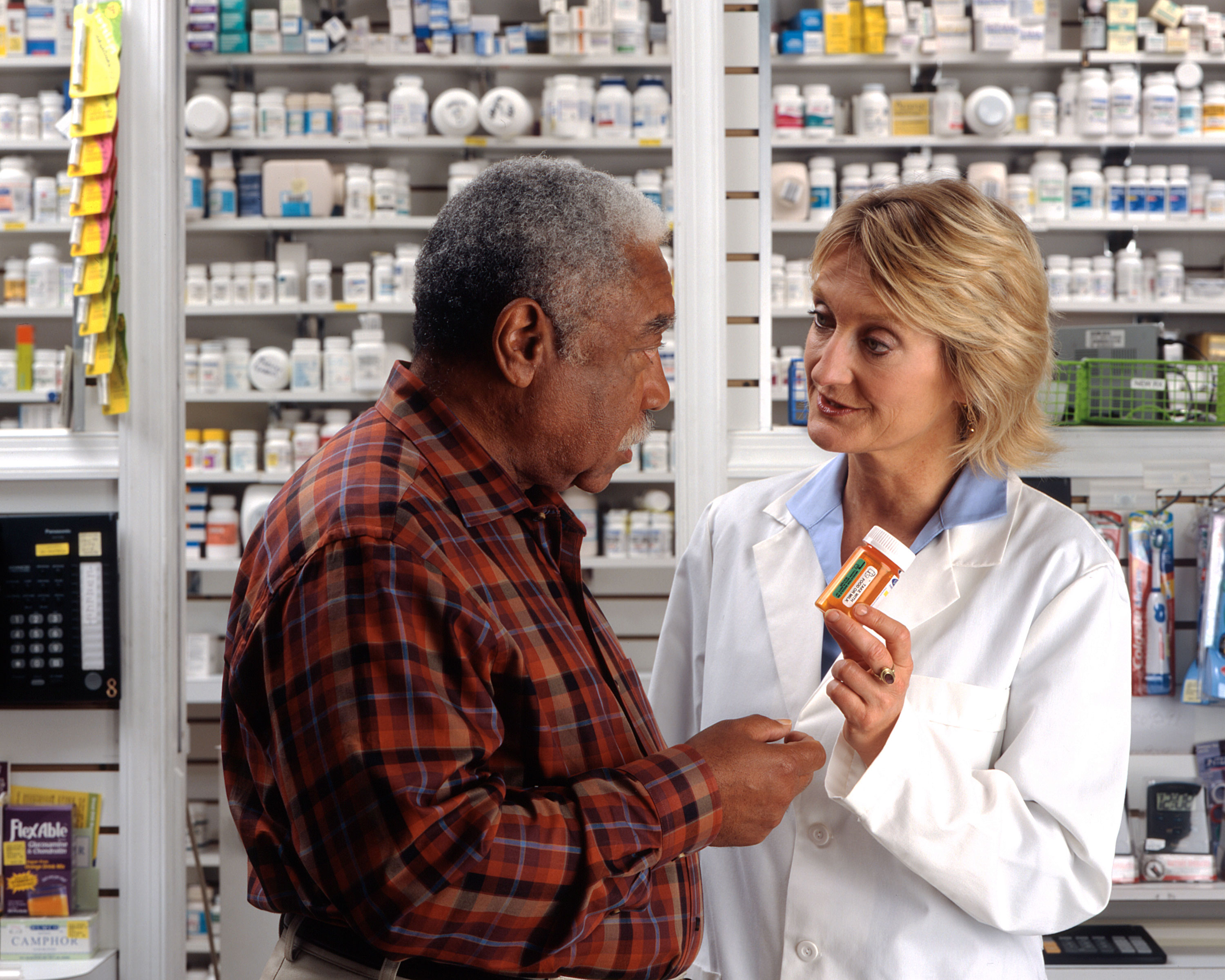
- A patient consulting a pharmacist

Occupation
- Names: Pharmacist, Chemist, Doctor of Pharmacy, Apothecary
- Occupation type: Professional
- Activity sectors: Health care, health sciences, chemical sciences

Description
- Competencies: Medication
- Education required: Doctor of Pharmacy, Master of Pharmacy, Bachelor of Pharmacy
- Fields of employment: Pharmacy
- Related jobs: Physician, pharmacy technician, toxicologist, chemist, other medical specialists

A pharmacist, also known as a chemist in Commonwealth English (excluding Canada), is a healthcare professional who is knowledgeable about preparation, mechanism of action, clinical usage and legislation of medications in order to dispense them safely to the public and to provide consultancy services. A pharmacist also often serves as a primary care provider in the community and offers services, such as health screenings and immunizations.

Pharmacists undergo university or graduate-level education to understand the biochemical mechanisms and actions of drugs, drug uses, therapeutic roles, side effects, potential drug interactions, and monitoring parameters. In developing countries, a diploma course from approved colleges qualifies one for pharmacist role. This is mated to anatomy, physiology, and pathophysiology. Pharmacists interpret and communicate this specialized knowledge to patients, physicians, and other health care providers.

Among other licensing requirements, different countries require pharmacists to hold either a Bachelor of Pharmacy, Master of Pharmacy, or a Doctor of Pharmacy degree.

The most common pharmacist positions are that of a community pharmacist (also referred to as a retail pharmacist, first-line pharmacist or dispensing chemist), or a hospital pharmacist, where they instruct and counsel on the proper use and adverse effects of medically prescribed drugs and medicines. In most countries, the profession is subject to professional regulation. Depending on the legal scope of practice, pharmacists may contribute to prescribing (also referred to as "pharmacist prescribers") and administering certain medications (e.g., immunizations) in some jurisdictions. Pharmacists may also practice in a variety of other settings, including industry, wholesaling, research, academia, formulary management, military, and government.

== Nature of work ==
Historically, the fundamental role of pharmacists as a healthcare practitioner was to check and distribute drugs to doctors for medication that had been prescribed to patients. In more modern times, pharmacists advise patients and health care providers on the selection, dosages, interactions, and side effects of medications, and act as a learned intermediary between a prescriber and a patient. Pharmacists monitor the health and progress of patients to ensure the safe and effective use of medication. Pharmacists may practice compounding; however, many medicines are now produced by pharmaceutical companies in a standard dosage and drug delivery form. In some jurisdictions, pharmacists have prescriptive authority to either independently prescribe under their own authority or in collaboration with a primary care physician through an agreed upon protocol called a collaborative practice agreement.

Increased numbers of drug therapies, aging but more knowledgeable and demanding populations, and deficiencies in other areas of the health care system seem to be driving increased demand for the clinical counseling skills of the pharmacist. One of the most important roles that pharmacists are currently taking on is one of pharmaceutical care. Pharmaceutical care involves taking direct responsibility for patients and their disease states, medications, and management of each to improve outcomes. Pharmaceutical care has many benefits that may include but are not limited to: decreased medication errors; increased patient compliance in medication regimen; better chronic disease state management, including hypertension and other cardiovascular disease risk factors; strong pharmacist–patient relationship; and decreased long-term costs of medical care.

Pharmacists are often the first point-of-contact for patients with health inquiries. Thus pharmacists have a significant role in assessing medication management in patients, and in referring patients to physicians. These roles may include, but are not limited to:

- clinical medication management, including reviewing and monitoring of medication regimens
- assessment of patients with undiagnosed or diagnosed conditions, and ascertaining clinical medication management needs
- specialized monitoring of disease states, such as dosing drugs in kidney and liver failure
- compounding medicines
- providing pharmaceutical information
- providing patients with health monitoring and advice, including advice and treatment of common ailments and disease states
- supervising pharmacy technicians and other staff
- oversight of dispensing medicines on prescription
- provision of and counseling about non-prescription or over-the-counter drugs
- education and counseling for patients and other health care providers on optimal use of medicines (e.g., proper use, avoidance of overmedication)
- referrals to other health professionals if necessary
- pharmacokinetic evaluation
- promoting public health by administering immunizations
- constructing drug formularies
- designing clinical trials for drug development
- working with federal, state, or local regulatory agencies to develop safe drug policies
- ensuring correctness of all medication labels including auxiliary labels
- member of inter-professional care team for critical care patients
- symptom assessment leading to medication provision and lifestyle advice for community-based health concerns (e.g. head colds, or smoking cessation)
- staged dosing supply (e.g. opioid substitution therapy)

== Education and credentialing ==
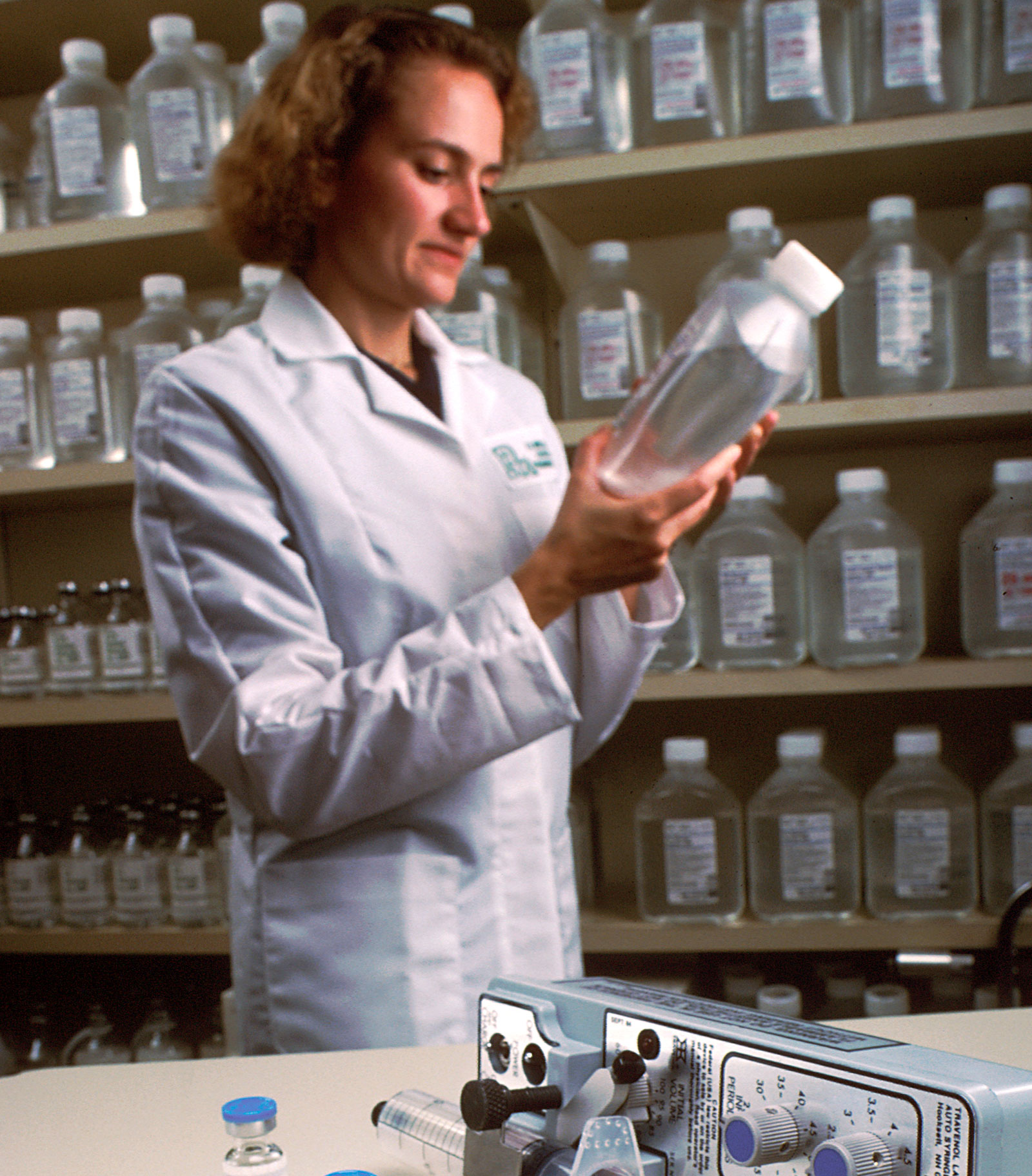
Hospital Pharmacist

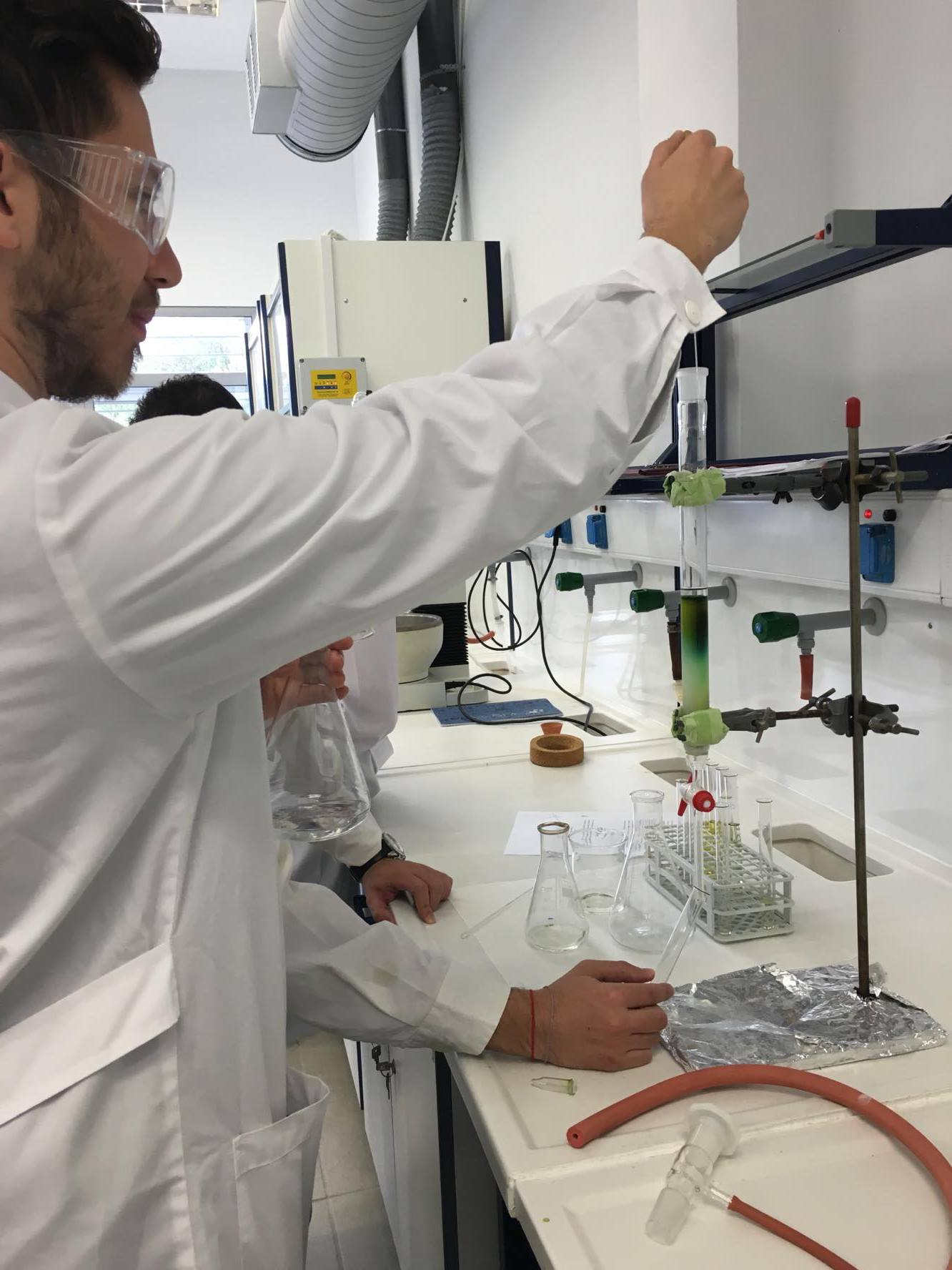
Industrial Pharmacist

The role of pharmacy education, pharmacist licensing, and continuing education vary from country to country and between regions/localities within countries. In most countries, pharmacists must obtain a university degree at a pharmacy school or related institution, and/or satisfy other national/local credentialing requirements. In many contexts, students must first complete pre-professional (undergraduate) coursework, followed by about four years of professional academic studies to obtain a degree in pharmacy (such as Doctorate of Pharmacy). In the European Union, pharmacists are required to hold a Master of Pharmacy, which allows them to practice in any other E.U. country, pending professional examinations and language tests in the country in which they want to practice. Pharmacists are educated in pharmacology, pharmacognosy, chemistry, organic chemistry, biochemistry, pharmaceutical chemistry, microbiology, pharmacy practice (including drug interactions, medicine monitoring, medication management), pharmaceutics, pharmacy law, pathophysiology , physiology, anatomy, drug delivery, pharmaceutical care, nephrology, hepatology, and compounding of medications. Additional curriculum may cover diagnosis with emphasis on laboratory tests, disease state management, therapeutics and prescribing (selecting the most appropriate medication for a given patient).

Upon graduation, pharmacists are licensed, either nationally or regionally, to dispense medication of various types in the areas they have trained for.

Some may undergo further specialized training, such as in cardiology or oncology or long-term care. Specialties include:

- Academic pharmacist
- Clinical pharmacy specialist
- Community pharmacist
- Compounding pharmacist
- Consultant pharmacist
- Long-term care pharmacist
- Drug information pharmacist
- Home health pharmacist
- Hospital pharmacist
- Industrial pharmacist
- Informatics pharmacist
- Managed care pharmacist
- Military pharmacist
- Nuclear pharmacist
- Oncology pharmacist
- Regulatory-affairs pharmacist
- Veterinary pharmacist
- Pharmacist clinical pathologist
- Pharmacist clinical toxicologist

== Training and practice by country ==
=== Armenia ===
The Ministry of Education and Ministry of Health oversee pharmacy school accreditation in Armenia. Pharmacists are expected to have competency in the WHO Model List of Essential Medicines (EML), the use of Standard Treatment Guidelines, drug information, clinical pharmacy, and medicine supply management. There are currently no laws requiring pharmacists to be registered, but all pharmacies must have a license to conduct business. According to a World Health Organization (WHO) report from 2010, there are 0.53 licensed pharmacists and 7.82 licensed pharmacies per 10,000 people in Armenia. Pharmacists are able to substitute for generic equivalents at point of dispensing.

=== Australia ===
The Australian Pharmacy Council is the independent accreditation agency for Australian pharmacists. The accreditation standards for Australian pharmacy degrees include compulsory clinical placements. with an emphasis on encouraging rural experiences to develop a rural workforce. It conducts a written examination on behalf of the Pharmacy Board of Australia towards eligibility for registration. The Pharmacy Board of Australia conducts an oral examination at the end of the intern year as the last hurdle prior to registration. The Pharmaceutical Society of Australia provides continuing education programs for pharmacists. The number of full-time equivalent pharmacists working in Australia over the past decade has remained stable. Pharmacy practice is described by the practice standards and guidelines including those from the Pharmaceutical Society of Australia.

The Australian Pharmacy Council is developing accreditation standards for pharmacists to prescribe and for pharmacists to work in aged care. The aged care accreditation standards are being developed in preparation for pharmacists working in residential aged care settings to ensure that they are adequately prepared.

There is a shortage of pharmacists at present leaving many jobs unfilled. Despite many pharmacists leaving the profession, pharmacists remain optimistic about their profession. Contract and casual work is becoming more common. A contract pharmacist is self-employed and often called a locum; these pharmacists may be hired for one shift or for a longer period of time. The number of pharmacists has stayed stable over a number of years.

=== Canada ===
The Canadian Pharmacists Association (CPhA) is the national professional organization for pharmacists in Canada. Specific requirements for practice vary across provinces, but generally include a bachelor's (BSc Pharm) or Doctor of Pharmacy (PharmD) degree from one of 10 Canadian universities offering a pharmacy program, successful completion of a national board examination through the Pharmacy Examining Board of Canada (PEBC) (Quebec being the exception), practical experience through an apprenticeship/internship program, and fluency in French or English. International pharmacy graduates can begin their journey of becoming licensed to practice in Canada by enrolling with the National Association of Pharmacy Regulatory Authorities (NAPRA) Pharmacists' Gateway Canada. The vast majority (~70%) of Canada's licensed pharmacists work in community pharmacies, another 15% work in hospital, and the remainder work in other settings such as industry, government, or universities. Pharmacists' scope of practice varies widely among the 13 provinces and territories and continues to evolve with time. As a result of pharmacists' expanding scope and knowledge application, there has been a purposeful effort to transition the professional programs in Canadian pharmacy schools to offer doctors of pharmacy over baccalaureate curriculums to ensure graduates have the most up to date level of training to match the increasing practice requirements.

=== European Union ===
The pharmacist qualification in the European Union is regulated by the Directive 2005/36/EC, where Section 7 Article 44(2) mandates at least five years of training including "four years of full-time theoretical and practical training" and "six-month traineeship in a pharmacy which is open to the public or in a hospital, under the supervision of that hospital's pharmaceutical department". The training of pharmacist must include at least: "Plant and animal biology, Physics, General and inorganic chemistry, Organic chemistry, Analytical chemistry, Pharmaceutical chemistry, including analysis of medicinal products, General and applied biochemistry (medical), Anatomy and physiology; medical terminology, Microbiology, Pharmacology and pharmacotherapy, Pharmaceutical technology, Toxicology, Pharmacognosy, Legislation and, where appropriate, professional ethics", which can be adapted to "scientific and technical progress" according to procedure in Directive 2005/36/EC.

==== Germany ====
In Germany, the education and training required by pharmacists is outlined by the Federal Ministry of Health in Approbationsordnung für Apotheker (AAppO), in English, Licensing Regulations for Pharmacists. The AAppO specifies the pharmaceutical education requirements as:

- A four-year course of study in pharmacy at a university.
- An eight-week clinical elective.
- A practical training course of twelve months.

The pharmaceutical licensing examination must be taken, and is taken in three sections. The first section is taken after studying pharmacy for two years, the second section is taken after passing the first section and studying pharmacy for at least four years, and the third section is taken after passing the second section and completing the clinical elective and practical training course requirements. After passing all three sections of the examination, an application for licensure to practice as a pharmacist must be submitted.

==== Ireland ====
The Pharmaceutical Society of Ireland is the national regulatory body for pharmacists and pharmacies in the Republic of Ireland. Training requirements to register as a pharmacist are described in the Pharmacy Act, 2007 (as amended) and the Pharmaceutical Society of Ireland (Education & Training)(Integrated Course) Rules 2014 (as amended). As of 2026, there are six accredited Master of Pharmacy (MPharm) programmes. Training is a minimum of five years, including 12 months of placements; four months in the 4th year and 8 months in the 5th year. At the end of the MPharm year, a professional competence examination (in the format of an objective structured clinical examination) must be passed to register as a pharmacist.

Upon registration, pharmacists may undertake further training to perform additional roles. The Emergency Medicines Training programme gives pharmacists the ability to supply and administer specific prescription medicines "for the purpose of saving life or reducing severe distress in certain emergency situations". The specified medicines are adrenaline (anaphylaxis), glucagon (hypoglycaemia), glyceryl trinitrate (angina), naloxone (opioid overdose), and salbutamol (asthma attack). Completion of specific vaccination training permits the supply and administration of the seasonal influenza vaccine, COVID-19 vaccines, pneumococcal polysaccharide vaccine and the herpes zoster (shingles) vaccine. The Common Conditions Service allows pharmacists who have completed required training to prescribe defined medicines to eligible patients for the management of allergic rhinitis, cold sores, conjunctivitis, cystitis, impetigo, oral thrush, shingles, and vaginal thrush.

==== Poland ====
Polish pharmacists have to complete a 5 1/2-year Master of Pharmacy Programme at medical university and obtain the right to practice as a pharmacist in Poland from District Pharmaceutical Council. The Programme includes six months of pharmacy training. The Polish name for the Master of Pharmacy Degree (M.Pharm.) is magister farmacji (mgr farm). Not only pharmacists, but also pharmaceutical technicians are allowed to dispense prescription medicines, except for narcotics, psychotropics and very potent medicines. Pharmacists approve prescriptions fulfilled by pharmaceutical technicians subsequently. Pharmaceutical technicians have to complete two years of post-secondary occupational school and 2 years of pharmacy training afterwards. Pharmacists are eligible to prescribe medicines in exceptional circumstances. All Polish pharmacies are obliged to produce compound medicines. Most pharmacists in Poland are pharmacy managers and are responsible for pharmacy marketing in addition to traditional activities. To become a pharmacy manager in Poland, a pharmacist is expected to have at least five years of professional experience. All pharmacists in Poland have to maintain an adequate knowledge level by participating in various university- and industry-based courses and arrangements or by undergoing postgraduate specialization.

==== Sweden ====
In Sweden, the national board of health and welfare regulates the practice of all legislated health care professionals, and is also responsible for registration of pharmacists in the country. The education to become a licensed pharmacist is regulated by the European Union, and states that minimum educational requirements are five years of university studies in a pharmacy program, of which six months must be a pharmacy internship. To be admitted to pharmacy studies, students must complete a minimum of three years of gymnasium, similar to high school (school for about 15–20-year-old students) program in natural science after elementary school (6–16-year-olds). Only three universities in the whole of Sweden offer a pharmacy education, Uppsala University, where the Faculty of Pharmacy is located, the University of Gothenburg, and Umeå University. In Sweden, pharmacists are called Apotekare. At pharmacies in Sweden, pharmacists work together with another class of legislated health care professionals called Receptarier, in English so-called prescriptionists, who have completed studies equal to a Bachelor of Science in pharmacy, i.e., three years of university. Prescriptionists also have dispensing rights in Sweden, Norway, Finland and Iceland. The majority of the staff in a pharmacy are Apotekstekniker or "pharmacy technicians" with a three -semester education at a vocational college. Pharmacy technicians do not have dispensing rights in Sweden but are allowed to advise on and sell over-the-counter medicines.

=== Japan ===
==== History ====
In ancient Japan, the men who fulfilled roles similar to pharmacists were respected. The place of pharmacists in society was settled in the Taihō Code (701) and re-stated in the Yōrō Code (718). Ranked positions in the pre-Heian Imperial court were established; and this organizational structure remained largely intact until the Meiji Restoration (1868). In this highly stable hierarchy, the pharmacists — and even pharmacist assistants — were assigned status superior to all others in health-related fields such as physicians and acupuncturists. In the Imperial household, the pharmacist was even ranked above the two personal physicians of the Emperor.

==== Contemporary ====
As of 1997, 46 universities of pharmacy in Japan graduated about 8000 students annually. Contemporary practice of clinical pharmacists in Japan (as evaluated in September 2000) focuses on dispensing of drugs, consultation with patients, supplying drug information, advising on prescription changes and amending prescriptions. These practices have been linked to decreases in the average number of drugs in prescriptions, drug costs and incidence of adverse drug events.

=== Nigeria ===
Training to become a registered pharmacist in Nigeria involves a five-year course after six years of secondary/high school or four years after eight years of secondary/high school (i.e. after 2 years of Advanced-level studies in accredited Universities). The degree awarded by most pharmacy schools is a Bachelor of Pharmacy Degree (B.Pharm.) However, in the near future, all schools will offer a 6-year first Degree course leading to the award of a Pharm.D (Doctor of Pharmacy Degree). The University of Benin has started the Pharm.D programme with other pharmacy schools planning to start soon. The Pharmacy Degree in Nigeria is unclassified i.e. awarded without first class, second class upper, etc., however graduates could be awarded Pass with Distinctions in specific fields such as Pharmaceutics, Pharmacology, medicinal chemistry etc. Pharmacy Graduates are required to undergo 1 year of Tutelage under the supervision of an already Registered Pharmacist(a preceptor) in a recognized and designated Institution before they can become Registered Pharmacists. The Profession is Regulated by a Government Statutory body called the Pharmacists Council of Nigeria. The West African Post Graduate College of Pharmacy runs post-registration courses on advanced-level practice in various fields of pharmacy. It is a college jointly funded by a number of Countries in the West Africa sub-region.

=== Pakistan ===
In Pakistan, the Pharm.D. (Doctor of Pharmacy) degree is a graduate-level professional doctorate degree. Twenty-one universities are registered with the Pharmacy Council of Pakistan for imparting Pharmacy courses. In 2004 the Higher Education Commission of Pakistan and the Pharmacy Council of Pakistan revised the syllabus and changed the 4-year B.Pharmacy (Bachelor of Pharmacy) Program to a 5-year Pharm.D. (Doctor of Pharmacy) program. All 21 universities have started the 5-year Pharm.D Program. In 2011 the Pharmacy Council of Pakistan approved the awarding of a Doctor of Pharmacy degree, a five-year programme at the Department of Pharmacy, University of Peshawar.

=== Switzerland ===
In Switzerland, the federal office of public health regulates pharmacy practice. Four Swiss universities offer a major in pharmaceutical studies, the University of Basel, the University of Geneva, the University of Lausanne and the ETH Zurich. To major in pharmaceutical studies takes at least five years. Students spend their last year as interns in a pharmacy combined with courses at the university, with focus on the validation of prescriptions and the manufacturing of pharmaceutical formulations. Since all public health professions are regulated by the government it is also necessary to acquire a federal diploma in order to work in a pharmacy. It is not unusual for pharmaceutical studies majors to work in other fields such as the pharmaceutical industry or in hospitals. Pharmacists work alongside pharma assistants, an apprenticeship that takes three years to complete. Pharmacists can further specialize in various fields; this is organized by PharmaSuisse, the pharmacists' association of Switzerland.

=== Tanzania ===
In Tanzania, pharmacy practice is regulated by the national Pharmacy Board, which is also responsible for registration of pharmacists in the country. By international standards, the density of pharmacists is very low, with a mean of 0.18 per 10,000 population. The majority of pharmacists are found in urban areas, with some underserved regions having only 2 pharmacists per region. According to 2007–2009 data, the largest group of pharmacists was employed in the public sector (44%). Those working in private retail pharmacies were 23%, and the rest were mostly working for private wholesalers, pharmaceutical manufacturers, in academia/teaching, or with faith-based or non-governmental facilities. The salaries of pharmacists varied significantly depending on the place of work. Those who worked in the academia were the highest paid followed by those who worked in the multilateral non-governmental organizations. The public sector including public retail pharmacies and faith based organizations paid much less. The Ministry of Health salary scale for medical doctors was considerably higher than that of pharmacists despite having a difference of only one year of training.

=== Trinidad and Tobago ===
In Trinidad and Tobago, pharmacy practice is regulated by the Pharmacy Board of Trinidad and Tobago, which is responsible for the registration of pharmacists in the twin islands. The University of the West Indies in St. Augustine offers a 4-year Bachelor of Science in Pharmacy as the sole practicing degree of pharmacy. Graduates undertake a 6-month internship, known as pre-registration, under the supervision of a registered pharmacist, at a pharmacy of their choosing, whether community or institutional. After completion of the required pre-registration period, the graduate can then apply to the Pharmacy Board to become a registered pharmacist. After working 1 calendar year as a registered pharmacist, the individual can become a registered, responsible pharmacist. Being a registered, responsible pharmacist allows the individual to license a pharmacy and be a pharmacist-in-charge.

=== United Kingdom ===
In British English (and to some extent Australian English), the professional title known as "pharmacist" is also known as "dispensing chemist" or, more commonly, "chemist". A dispensing chemist usually operates from a pharmacy or chemist's shop, and is allowed to fulfil medical prescriptions and sell over-the-counter drugs and other health-related goods. Pharmacists can undertake additional training to allow them to prescribe medicines for specific conditions.

==== Practices ====
In the United Kingdom, most pharmacists working in the National Health Service practice in hospital pharmacy or community pharmacy. The Royal Commission on the National Health Service in 1979 reported that there were nearly 3,000 pharmacists employed in the hospital and community health service in the UK at that time. They were enthusiastic about the idea that pharmacists might develop their role of giving advice to the public.

The new professional role for pharmacist as prescriber has been recognized in the UK since May 2006, called the "Pharmacist Independent Prescriber". Once qualified, a pharmacist independent prescriber can prescribe any licensed medicine for any medical condition within their competence. This includes controlled drugs except schedule 1 and prescribing certain drugs for the treatment of addiction (cocaine, diamorphine and dipipanone).

==== Education and registration ====
Pharmacists, pharmacy technicians and pharmacy premises in the United Kingdom are regulated by the General Pharmaceutical Council (GPhC) for England, Scotland and Wales and by the Pharmaceutical Society of Northern Ireland for Northern Ireland. The role of regulatory and professional body on the mainland was previously carried out by the Royal Pharmaceutical Society of Great Britain, which remained as a professional body after handing over the regulatory role to the GPhC in 2010.

The following criteria must be met for qualification as a pharmacist in the United Kingdom (the Northern Irish body and the GPhC operate separately but have broadly similar registration requirements):

- Successful completion of a 4-year Master of Pharmacy degree at a GPhC accredited university. Pharmacists holding degrees in pharmacy from overseas institutions are able to fulfill this stage by undertaking the Overseas Pharmacist Assessment Programme (OSPAP), which is a one-year postgraduate diploma. On completion of the OSPAP, the candidate would proceed with the other stages of the registration process in the same manner as a UK student.
- Completion of a 52-week preregistration training period. This is a period of paid or unpaid employment, in an approved hospital or community pharmacy under the supervision of a pharmacist tutor. During this time the student must collect evidence of having met certain competency standards set by the GPhC.
- A pass mark in the GPhC registration assessment (formally an exam). This includes a closed-book paper and an open-book/mental calculations paper (using the British National Formulary and the GPhC's "Standards of Conduct, Ethics and Performance" document as reference sources). The student must achieve an overall mark of 70%, which must include at least 70% in the calculations section of the open-book paper. From June 2016, the assessment will involve two papers, as before but the use of a calculator will now be allowed. However, reference sources will no longer be allowed in the assessment. Instead, relevant extracts of the British National Formulary will be provided within the assessment paper.
- Satisfactorily meeting the GPhC's Fitness to Practice Standards.

=== United States ===
In 2014, the United States Bureau of Labor Statistics revealed that there were 297,100 American pharmacist jobs. By 2024 that number was projected to grow by 3%. The majority (65%) of those pharmacists work in retail settings, mostly as salaried employees but some as self-employed owners. About 22% work in hospitals, and the rest mainly in mail-order or Internet pharmacies, pharmaceutical wholesalers, practices of physicians, and the Federal Government.

All graduating pharmacists must now obtain the Doctor of Pharmacy (Pharm.D.) degree before they are eligible to sit for the North American Pharmacist Licensure Examination (NAPLEX) to enter into pharmacy practice. In addition, pharmacists are subject to state-level jurisprudence exams in order to practice from state to state.

==== Pharmacy School Accreditation ====
The Accreditation Council for Pharmacy Education (ACPE) has operated since 1932 as the accrediting body for schools of pharmacy in the United States. The mission of ACPE is "To assure and advance excellence in education for the profession of pharmacy". ACPE is recognized for the accreditation of professional degree programs by the United States Department of Education (USDE) and the Council for Higher Education Accreditation (CHEA). Since 1975, ACPE has also been the accrediting body for continuing pharmacy education. The ACPE board of directors are appointed by the American Association of Colleges of Pharmacy (AACP), the American Pharmacists Association (APhA), the National Association of Boards of Pharmacy (NABP) (three appointments each), and the American Council on Education (one appointment). To obtain licensure in the United States, applicants for the North American Pharmacist Licensure Examination (NAPLEX) must graduate from an ACPE accredited school of pharmacy. ACPE publishes standards that schools of pharmacy must comply with to gain accreditation.

A Pharmacy school pursuing accreditation must first apply and be granted Pre-candidate status. These schools have met all the requirements for accreditation, but have not yet enrolled any students. This status indicates that the school of pharmacy has developed its program in accordance with the ACPE standards and guidelines. Once a school has enrolled students, but has not yet had a graduating class, they may be granted Candidate status. The expectations of a Candidate program are that they continue to mature in accordance with stated plans. The graduates of a Candidate program are the same as those of fully accredited programs. Full accreditation is granted to a program once they have demonstrated they comply with the standards set forth by ACPE.

The customary review cycle for established accredited programs is six years, whereas for programs achieving their initial accreditation this cycle is two years. These are comprehensive on-site evaluations of the programs. Additional evaluations may be conducted at the discretion of ACPE in the interim between comprehensive evaluations.

==== Education ====
Acceptance into a doctorate of pharmacy program depends upon completing specific prerequisites or obtaining a transferable bachelor's degree. Pharmacy school is four years of graduate school (accelerated Pharmacy Schools go January to January and are only three years), which include at least one year of practical experience. Graduates receive a Doctorate of Pharmacy (PharmD) upon graduation. Most schools require students to take a Pharmacy College Admissions Test PCAT and complete 90 credit hours of university coursework in the sciences, mathematics, composition, and humanities before entry into the PharmD program. Due to the large admittance requirements and highly competitive nature of the field, most pharmacy students complete a bachelor's degree before entry to pharmacy school.

Possible prerequisites:

- Anatomy
- Physiology
- Biochemistry
- Biology
- Immunology
- Chemical engineering
- Economics
- Pathophysiology
- Physics
- Humanities
- Microbiology
- Molecular biology
- Organic chemistry
- Physical chemistry
- Statistics
- Calculus

Besides taking classes, additional requirements before graduating may include a certain number of hours for community service, e.g., working in hospitals, clinics, and retail.

Estimated timeline: 4 years undergraduate + 4 years doctorate + 1–2 years residency + 1–3 years fellowship = 8–13 years

A doctorate of pharmacy (except non-traditional, i.e. transferring a license from another country) is the only degree accepted by the National Associate of Boards of Pharmacy NABP to be eligible to "sit" for the North American Pharmacist Licensure Examination (NAPLEX). Previously the United States had a 5-year bachelor's degree in pharmacy. For BS Pharmacy graduates currently licensed in US, there are 10 Universities offering non-traditional doctorate degree programs via part-time, weekend or on-line programs. These are programs fully accredited by Accreditation Council for Pharmacy Education (ACPE) but only available to current BS Pharmacy graduates with a license to practice pharmacy. Some institutions still offer 6 year accelerated PharmD programs.

The current Pharm.D. degree curriculum is considerably different from that of the prior BS in pharmacy. It now includes extensive didactic clinical preparation, a full year of hands-on practice experience in a wider array of healthcare settings, and a greater emphasis on clinical pharmacy practice pertaining to pharmacotherapy optimization. Legal requirements in the US to becoming a pharmacist include: graduating from an accredited PharmD program, conducting a specified number of internship hours under a licensed pharmacist (i.e. 1800 hours in some states), passing the NAPLEX, and passing a Multi-state Pharmacy Jurisprudence Exam MPJE. Arkansas, California, and Virginia have their own exams instead of the MPJE; in those states, pharmacists must pass the Arkansas Jurisprudence Exam, the California Jurisprudence Exam, or the Virginia Pharmacy Law Exam.

Residency is an option for post-graduates that is typically 1–2 years in length. A residency gives licensed pharmacists decades of clinical experience in an extremely condensed timeframe of only a few short years. In order for new graduates to remain competitive, employers generally favor residency trained applicants for clinical positions. The profession is moving toward resident-trained pharmacists who wish to provide direct patient care clinical services. In 1990, the American Association of Colleges of Pharmacy (AACP) required the new professional degree. Graduates from a PharmD program may also elect to do a fellowship that is geared toward research. Fellowships can varying in length but last 1–3 years depending on the program and usually require 1 year of residency at minimum.

==== Specialization and credentialing ====
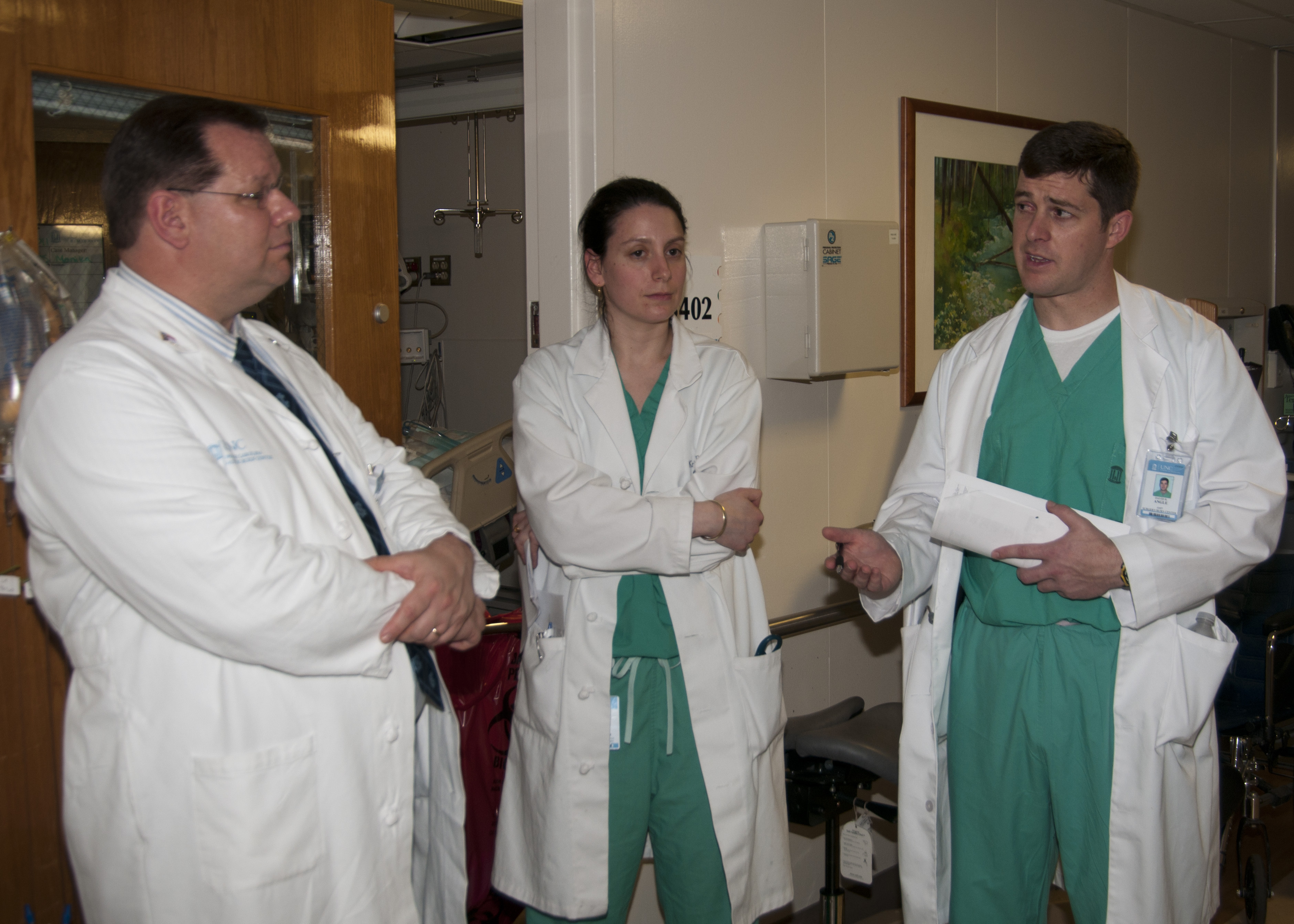
Clinical pharmacists go on rounds with doctors in order to provide direct patient care and comprehensive medication management.

American pharmacists can become certified in recognized specialty practice areas by passing an examination administered by one of several credentialing boards.

- The Board of Pharmacy Specialties certifies pharmacists in thirteen specialties:
  - Ambulatory care pharmacy
  - Cardiology pharmacy
  - Compounded sterile preparations pharmacy
  - Critical care pharmacy
  - Geriatric pharmacy
  - Infectious diseases pharmacy
  - Nuclear pharmacy
  - Nutrition support pharmacy
  - Oncology pharmacy
  - Pediatric pharmacy
  - Pharmacotherapy
  - Psychiatric pharmacy
  - Solid organ transplant pharmacy
- The American Board of Applied Toxicology certifies pharmacists and other medical professionals in applied toxicology.

==== Expanding scope of practice ====
===== Vaccinations =====
As of 2016, all 50 states and the District of Columbia permit pharmacists to provide vaccination services, but specific protocols vary between states.

===== California =====
All licensed California pharmacists can perform the following:

- Order and interpret drug therapy related tests
- Furnish smoking cessation aids (such as nicotine replacement therapy)
- Furnish oral self-administered contraception (birth control pills)
- Furnish travel medications recommended by the CDC
- Administer vaccinations pursuant to the latest CDC standards for anyone ages 3+

The passage of Assembly Bill 1535 (2014) authorizes pharmacists in California to furnish naloxone without a physician's prescription.

With the passage of Senate Bill 159 in 2019, pharmacists in California are authorized to furnish pre-exposure prophylaxis (PrEP) and post-exposure prophylaxis (PEP) to patients without a physician's prescription. In order to be eligible to dispense, a pharmacists must first "complete a training program approved by the" California State Board of Pharmacy.

California pharmacists can apply for Advanced Practice Pharmacist (APh) licenses from the California State Board of Pharmacy. Senate Bill 493, written by Senator Ed Hernandez, established a section on the Advanced Practice Pharmacist and outlines the definition, scope of practice, qualifications, and regulations of those holding this license. An APh can:

- Perform patient assessments
- Refer patients to other healthcare providers
- Participate in the evaluation and management of diseases and health conditions in collaboration with other health care providers
- Initiate, adjust, or discontinue therapy pursuant to the regulations outlined in the bill

To qualify for an advanced practice pharmacist license in California, the applicant must be in good standing with the State Board of pharmacy, have an active pharmacist license, and fulfill two of three requirements, including certification in their area clinical practice. The license must be renewed every 2 years, and the APh applying for renewal must complete 10 hours of continuing education in at least one area relevant to their clinical practice.

==== Earnings and wages ====
According to a 2010 PharmacyWeek survey, pharmacists were paid the following average annual salaries, depending on their positions:

- Directors of Pharmacy $125,200
- Retail Staff Pharmacists $113,600
- Hospital Staff Pharmacists $111,700
- Mail Order Staff Pharmacists $109,300
- Clinical Pharmacists $113,400

The American Pharmacy Journal of Education in 2014 reported the average salary around $112,160.

According to the US Bureau of Labor Statistics' Occupational Outlook Handbook, 2016–17 Edition, Median annual wages of wage and salary pharmacists in May 2015 were $121,500.

In 2020 US News and World Report noted that the median pharmacist salary was $128,710. The top 25 percent of pharmacist earners made $147,690 that year, while the lowest 25 percent made $112,690.

=== Vietnam ===
School students must take a national exam to enter a university of pharmacy or the pharmacy department of a university of medicine and pharmacy. About 5–7% of students can pass the exam. There are 3 aspects to the exam. These are on math, chemistry, and physics or biology. After being trained at the university for 5 years, successful students receive a bachelor's degree in pharmacy. Or they are university pharmacists (university pharmacist to discriminate between college pharmacist or vocational pharmacist in some countries of the world these trainee pharmacists are called pharmacist assistants). An alternative method of obtaining a bachelor's degree is as follows. School pupils study at a college of pharmacy or a vocational school of pharmacy. After attending the school or college they go to work in a pharmacy, and with two years of practice they could take an exam to enter university of pharmacy or the pharmacy department of a university of medicine and pharmacy. This exam is easier than the national one. Passing the exam they continue studying to gain 3-year bachelor's degrees or 4-year bachelor's degrees. This degree is considered equivalent to a 5-year bachelor's degree.

=== Sri Lanka ===
In Sri Lanka one can become a pharmacist after completing the external or internal pharmacy exam conducted by CMCC (the Ceylon Medical College council) which has 4 parts.

== Notable pharmacists ==
- Charles Alderton (1857-1941), American inventor of the soft drink Dr Pepper
- Caleb Bradham (1867-1934), American inventor of the soft drink Pepsi
- Ikililou Dhoinine (born 1962), Comorian politician
- Pravin Gordhan (born 1949), minister in South African government
- Luke Howard (1772–1864), "the father of meteorology"
- Hubert Humphrey (1911-1978), U.S. Vice President 1965–69
- David Jack (1924–2011), leader of research that developed major asthma drugs
- Edna O'Brien (born 1930), Irish author and playwright
- Hans Christian Ørsted (1777–1851), Danish physicist who discovered electromagnetism
- Tadeusz Pankiewicz (1908-1993), Polish pharmacist in the Kraków Ghetto and activist during World War II
- John Pemberton (1831-1888), American inventor of the soft drink Coca-Cola
- Friedrich Sertürner (1783-1841), German chemist who discovered morphine
- Joseph Swan (1828–1914), inventor of the incandescent light bulb
- Henri Moissan (1852–1907), chemist and pharmacist who won the 1906 Nobel Prize in Chemistry

== See also ==
- Apothecary
- Chemist
- Clinical pharmaceutical scientist
- Classification of Pharmaco-Therapeutic Referrals
- History of pharmacy
- List of pharmacists
- List of pharmacy associations
- List of pharmacy schools
- Pharmacist prescriber
- Pharmaconomist
- Pharmacy
- Pharmacy automation
- Pharmacy technician
- Pharmacy residency
- Soda jerk
