= Pharmacy school =

Education institution training pharmacists

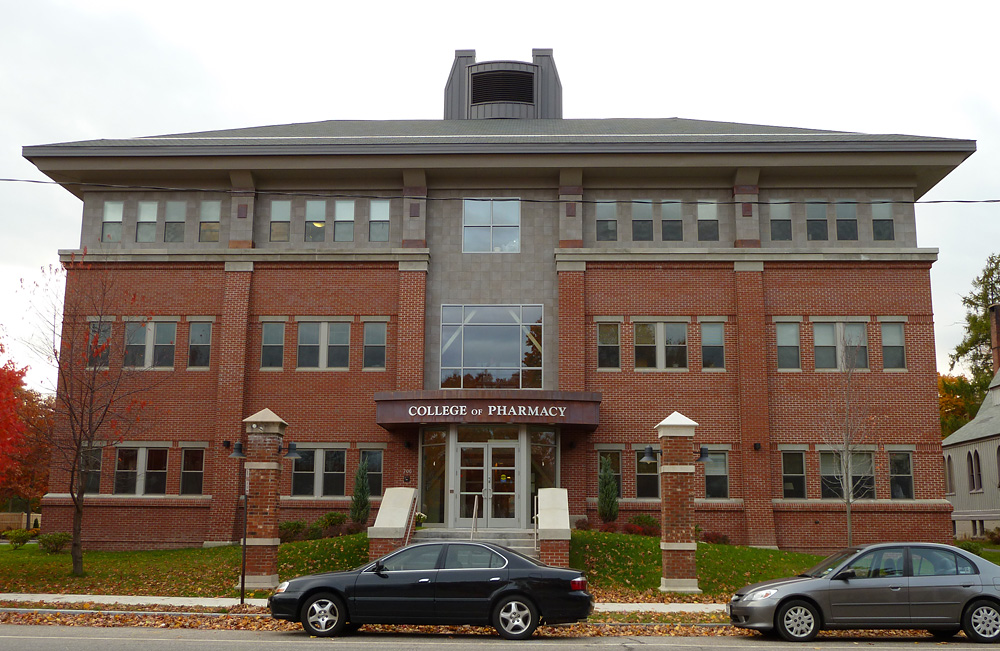
University of New England College of Pharmacy in Portland, Maine.

A pharmacy school is an accredited higher education institution that is specialized in training students to become pharmacists. Pharmacy schools are often departments/schools within recognized universities that provide undergraduate or postgraduate pharmacy degrees. In many countries, these degrees span 4–5 years.

In the United States since 2003, students must complete a doctor of pharmacy degree to become a licensed pharmacist, with a similar requirement being introduced in some other countries such as Canada and France. The doctor of pharmacy degree usually requires completion of four years at an accredited college of pharmacy after an undergraduate degree or other approved courses.

To practice as a pharmacist, registration with the country, state, or province's regulatory agency is required. There is often a requirement for the pharmacy graduate to have completed a certain number of hours of experience in a pharmacy under the supervision of a registered pharmacist. If the regulatory body governs an entire country, they will usually administer a written and oral examination to the prospective pharmacist prior to registration. If its jurisdiction is limited to a specific jurisdiction, such as a state or province, the required examination is administered by a national examining board.

== Australia ==
In Australia, a pharmacist must complete an undergraduate four-year Bachelor of Pharmacy course followed by an internship and independent examinations set by respective state registration boards. In addition, graduates are required to complete an approved graduate training course. There is the option of a postgraduate two-year Master of Pharmacy (MPharm) course for those with undergraduate science degree background.

Since July 1, 2010, pharmacists are registered nationally with the Australian Health Practitioners Registration Authority [AHPRA], having previously been registered by individual states (e.g. The Pharmacy Board of New South Wales, The Pharmacy Board of Victoria etc.). Graduates are required to complete one year of practice under the supervision of a registered pharmacist. In addition, graduates are required to complete an approved graduate training course. On meeting these requirements, graduates are eligible to sit the registration examination which may involve both written and oral components.

== Canada ==
In Canada, pharmacists must complete undergraduate four-year Bachelor of Science degrees in pharmacy after completing a minimum of one or two years of university study studies beforehand. The University of Waterloo requires two years of prerequisite study in the basic sciences.

The degree in pharmacy is composed of coursework and clinical experience through required internships and work placements, followed by the completion of a national board examination administered by the Pharmacy Examining Board of Canada.

The pharmacy schools in Quebec (at the University of Montreal and Laval University) now offer only the PharmD degree that involves two years of basic sciences and four years of pharmacy education, similar to many programs in the United States.

The University of Alberta Department of Pharmacy and Pharmaceutical sciences will start a one-year post-B.S. degree PharmD program in 2013. This will prepare students for the PharmD programs.

Many hospital pharmacists also complete a hospital pharmacy residency program. This is a 12-to-24 month directed postgraduate learning experience. Through structured rotations in pharmacy practice, education, research, and administration, residency programs intend to prepare pharmacists for challenging and innovative pharmacy practice. Graduate residents are an important source of highly qualified pharmacists trained in institutional practice. Most residency programs are accredited by the Canadian Hospital Pharmacy Residency Board on behalf of the Canadian Society of Hospital Pharmacists.

Finally, there is the option of students taking a graduate two-year Doctor of Pharmacy (PharmD) course of study for those with Bachelor of Pharmacy or equivalent degrees. This advanced PharmD program can be pursued in Canada at the University of British Columbia and the University of Toronto and at several pharmacy schools in the United States (as the "non-traditional" PharmD). The advanced PharmD programs in the United States were phased out by the introduction of the entry-level PharmD programs, which despite being identical in their names, differ from the advanced level PharmD programs in terms of the depth and scope of the teaching.

The profession of pharmacy is regulated on a provincial level. The provincial regulatory authorities are directly responsible for granting pharmacist licenses, assessing the competency of pharmacists and ensuring public safety. The National Association of Pharmacy Regulatory Authorities was established in 1995 as a way to harmonize the activities of the provincial regulatory authorities. They represent the interests of the provincial authorities and serve as a national resource centre for all pharmacists. CPhA is actively involved on several NAPRA committees.

== Chile ==
In Chile, students must study six years to become pharmacists. The best school of pharmacy is at Universidad de Chile , in Santiago de Chile. Chilean pharmacists are prepared not only to dispense and be able to work at clinical and community pharmacies, but in Pharmaceutical, Food and Cosmetic industry at every level, including drug development (a Degree is needed here), manufacturing, management, marketing, etc., due to the very strong scientific preparation they receive, including engineering and pharmaceutical technology topics. The official title for pharmacists in Chile is Químico Farmacéutico (Pharmaceutical Chemist), and their degree is Licenciado en Ciencias Químicas y farmacéuticas (Bachelor in Chemical and Pharmaceutical Sciences).

== Denmark ==
The education of pharmacists (Danish: farmaceut) in Denmark takes place at the University of Copenhagen's Faculty of Health and Medical Sciences.

The Bachelor of Pharmacy (BPharm) degree (Danish: bachelor i farmaci) takes three years. The Master of Pharmacy (MPharm) degree (Danish: cand.pharm.) takes two years. In order to work as a pharmacist in Denmark, the MPharm degree is required (a total of five years).

After graduation as a pharmacist with the MPharm degree, the student can begin the three-year Doctor of Pharmacy (DPharm) education programme (Danish: dr.pharm.).

In addition to pharmacists, in Denmark there is another professional group with a pharmaceutical higher education: the pharmaconomists (experts in pharmaceuticals), whose education takes place at the Pharmakon—Danish College of Pharmacy Practice.

== France ==
In France, a six-year PharmD (called "Diplôme d'Etat de Docteur en Pharmacie") must be completed. At the end of the fifth year, young pharmacists can choose to pass a competitive examination. If they succeed, the few students chosen can then follow a four-year specialty (like physicians). This is a pharmaceutical residency program called the "Internat en Pharmacie". During this residency, the pharmacists specialize in Laboratory Medicine called "biologie médicale", or in hospital pharmacy, or in research (Innovation Pharmaceutique et Recherche).

== Greece ==
In Greece, a five-year University course must be completed. This course is offered by the University of Athens , the University of Thessaloniki and the University of Patras. The course comprises 4 years of theory and laboratory practice and a 5th year of compulsory, full-time in-service training in a community pharmacy and the pharmaceutical department of a hospital. An additional trimester placement in a pharmaceutical industry is also an option, however it does not count towards the acquisition of the license to practice. Upon successful completion of the course, a Degree in Pharmacy is awarded. Since September 2011, undergraduate students that have completed a thesis in the University of Athens during the 5th year of their studies, are able to obtain a Certificate, equivalent to master's degree, together with the Bachelor of Pharmacy.

The pharmacy graduate may pursue a career in the industry after graduation. A career in this field does not require a license to practice pharmacy. However, pharmacists wishing to open a pharmacy, work in hospitals or in the National Organization of Medicines must first successfully participate in board examinations organized by the Greek Ministry of Health, in order to obtain a License to Practice Pharmacy.

== Guyana ==
In Guyana, the Bachelor of Science Degree in Pharmacy is a four-year professional programme. The Pharmacy course offered by the University of Guyana consists of foundation core courses in the first year of the programme followed by three years of core health sciences, professional and pharmacy practice courses.

== India ==
In India, group of national level institutes of pharmaceutical sciences or Pharmacy school in India called NIPERs also various colleges and universities offer D.Pharm, B.Pharm, M.Pharm and Pharm.D programs. All India Council for Technical Education (AICTE) and Pharmacy Council of India (PCI) are responsible government bodies for the accreditation of pharmacy education in India.

D.pharm (Diploma in Pharmacy) is a 2 years diploma program after Higher Secondary (School) Certificate (HSC) or 10+2 exam in the science stream. It is the minimum requirement for registration as a pharmacist in India.

B.Pharm (Bachelor of Pharmacy) is a 4 years undergraduate program. M.Pharm (Master of Pharmacy) is a 2 years post graduate course after B.Pharm degree from a PCI approved institute.

The Doctor of Pharmacy (Pharm.D) course was introduced in India in 2008 by the PCI. The duration of Pharm.D is 6 years (5 years of study+1 year of internship/residency). It is a post-graduate (PG) qualification and hence Pharm.D graduates can register directly for Ph.D. All candidates being awarded the Pharm.D degree are eligible to use the prefix "Dr." before their name. Pharm.D. (Post Baccalaureate) (Doctor of Pharmacy) is a 3 years (2 years of classroom studies+1 year of internship) program. Admission requirements are B.Pharm from any PCI approved institute.

== Iran ==
In Iran, The doctor of pharmacy is a 5.5 years program requiring 11 semesters of coursework in the classroom and experiential practice.

== Ireland ==
Traditionally in Ireland, a four-year BPharm degree was completed followed by one year of pre-registration clinical training. The one-year of pre-registration training has been replaced by an internship program, for which the student both works and completes assignments, leading to the award of an M.Pharm degree from the Royal College of Surgeons.

A five-year integrated master's degree program will commence in September 2015. At the moment there are three universities in Ireland offering a B.Pharm degree: Trinity College Dublin, the University College Cork, and the Royal College of Surgeons in Ireland.

== New Zealand ==
In New Zealand, as with other western nations, a four-year BPharm must be completed, followed by an internship at a pharmacy (Community, Hospital, Industry &/or University). Pharmacists are registered with the Pharmacy Council and must meet competence standards as set by the Pharmaceutical Society Of New Zealand. The degree can be taken at University of Otago in Dunedin and University of Auckland in Auckland. The School of Pharmacy is divided into three main sections of research focus. These are:

Division of Pharmacy Practice: Focussed on the inter-relationship between pharmacists and the communities they serve. Division of Pharmaceutical Sciences: Focussed on the molecular mechanism and biological basis of drug development. Division of Pharmacotherapy: Focussed on the application and effects of pharmaceuticals in clinical settings.

Postgraduate studies include diplomas, Masters, PhD and DPharm. which may be clinical, practice or pharmaceutical specialties.

== Portugal ==
In Portugal, the degree in Pharmacy is a MPharm program called master's degree in Pharmaceutical Sciences (Portuguese: Mestrado Integrado em Ciências Farmacêuticas) and is already adapted to the European Bologna process. It consists of five years of study with the last semester consisting of full-time in-service training at a community pharmacy (four months) and at the pharmacy department of a hospital (two months).

After earning the degree certificate, graduates must join the "Order of Pharmacists" (Portuguese: "Ordem dos Farmacêuticos"), the regulatory and licensing body for the pharmaceutical profession in Portugal, in order to be registered as pharmacists and become legally qualified to work in the profession.

Presently, there are five public and four private universities offering the MPharm degree in Portugal. The public schools of pharmacy of the University of Lisbon, the University of Porto, and the University of Coimbra are considered to be the highest pharmacy schools in the country.

== Qatar ==
In Qatar, a minimum of a bachelor's degree in Pharmacy is required to practice as a licensed pharmacist. Qatar University (the only national university) began to offer a 5-year BSc (Pharm) degree in 2007. A 6-year PharmD degree program has also been approved, with a student intake expected by 2011. In 2008, the College of Pharmacy became Qatar University's seventh college, which has received early accreditation by the Canadian Council for Accreditation of Pharmacy Programs (CCAPP). It is currently the first and only pharmacy college in the country.

== Serbia ==
In Serbia, there are 4 universities for the study of pharmacy: the University of Belgrade, University of Kragujevac, University of Nis, and the University of Novi Sad. Studies are held at the Faculty of Pharmacy in Belgrade, Faculty of Medical Sciences in Kragujevac, Faculty of Medicine in Niš and the Faculty of Medicine in Novi Sad. The first studies of pharmacy began at the Faculty of Medicine in Belgrade 24 October 1939 and then grew into an independent faculty (Faculty of Pharmacy) 19 October 1945. Integrated studies of pharmacy can be studied by anyone who has finished secondary education, typically after a Gymnasium or a four-year nursing school, or any other high school lasting four years. During the application process, their high school grades and the score on the entrance exam (пријемни испит/prijemni ispit) are taken into account, and the best students are enrolled. Entrance exam includes testing of students' knowledge of chemistry and mathematics. Studies last 5 years (10 semesters) and the title after graduation is "Master of Pharmacy" (магистар фармације/magistar farmacije). The usual information that students attain include pharmacology, pharmacognosy, pharmaceutical chemistry, pharmaceutical technology, cosmetology, nutrition, chemistry, and other pharmaceutical-based studies. Graduated pharmacists can either move on to postgraduate studies or get employed in pharmacies, pharmaceutical industry, control of quality of medications, laboratories for researching, in nursing schools as teachers, as a clinical pharmacist, in hospitals, or pharmacist-biochemist in various laboratories.

== South Korea ==
In South Korea, the new six-year program in pharmacy education has been in effect since 2011.

== Thailand ==
In Thailand, there are currently two kinds of programs for Pharmacy studies.
1) a five years program - Bachelor of Pharmacy or B.Pharm
2) a six years program - Doctor of Pharmacy (Pharmaceutical Care) or Pharm. D

Some universities in Thailand offer a two years course for anyone graduating with B. Pharm to complete Pharm. D

== United Kingdom ==
In the United Kingdom, integration with the European Union has resulted in the BPharm and BSc courses being superseded by a four-year course for the qualification Master of Pharmacy (MPharm). In Great Britain the General Pharmaceutical Council is responsible for regulation of pharmacy affairs and in Northern Ireland it is the Pharmaceutical Society of Northern Ireland. Graduates must complete one year of practical training and pass a registration examination before they can be entered on the register of pharmacists, known as the register of pharmaceutical chemists. Post registration professional education can be provided by organisations such as the UK Clinical Pharmacy Association.

Please see the List of schools of pharmacy in the United Kingdom which offer the MPharm course.

Pharmacists registered in other countries can also register in the UK. Overseas pharmacists are required to undertake the Overseas Pharmacists Assessment Programme (OSPAP), a one-year intensive course focused on pharmacy practice in Great Britain. OSPAP authorisation can be given by the General Pharmaceutical Council and the course is undertaken either the University of Sunderland, Aston University, University of Hertfordshire, Kingston University or the University of Brighton. However, pharmacists that have obtained their qualifications and are registered in other countries of the European Economic Area can register with the General Pharmaceutical Council without undergoing additional or pre-registration training.

Pharmacists in the UK can now be accredited to perform a number of enhanced services. These include but are not limited to medicine use reviews (MUR's) and Patient Group Directives (where certain prescription-only medicines can be supplied by the pharmacist for indications such as hair restoration, weight loss, emergency hormonal contraception and erectile dysfunction).

The titles Pharmacist, Pharmacy Technician and Pharmacy are legally protected in the United Kingdom. They can only be used by individuals that are registered with the General Pharmaceutical Council ; any other users are guilty of a criminal offence.

== United States ==
Traditionally in the United States, the Bachelor of Science in Pharmacy was the first-professional degree for pharmacy practice. However, in 1990, the American Association of Colleges of Pharmacy (AACP) mandated that a Doctor of Pharmacy (Pharm.D.) would be the new first professional degree beginning with the class of 2006.

Successful completion of an Accreditation Council for Pharmaceutical Education (ACPE)-accredited pharmacy program allows pharmacy students to sit for licensure examinations (see Pharmacy Education, Pharmacist) and become registered pharmacists (R.Ph.) through each state's respective subsidiary of the National Association of Boards of Pharmacy (NABP).

=== Admissions ===
As of December 2022, there were 142 accredited Schools of Pharmacy. This statistic includes both fully accredited schools or those with candidate status.

Today, individuals seeking to become pharmacists must first complete a pre-pharmacy undergraduate program. This program consists of a minimum of 60-90 semester credit hours (90-100 quarter credit hours) of undergraduate coursework in basic and advanced sciences; however, many students find completion of a four-year program (between 120-130 semester credit hours) leading to a Bachelor of Science degree in biology, chemistry, or a similar field enhances their chances of admission. Pre-requisite and application requirements vary by individual schools/colleges of pharmacy; therefore, it is prudent to be aware of requirements for prospective schools throughout undergraduate education. The application requirement and processes for pharmacy school admission varies (see Pharmacy Education). A full list of ACPE-accredited programs is available at the ACPE website. Additionally, a PCAT (Pharmacy College Admission Test) score is required at most colleges and schools of pharmacy. Additional requirements for entry may include essays, references, an interview or participation in other activities.

PharmCAS is a Pharmacy College Application Service that enables students to apply to multiple pharmacy colleges/schools with a single online application. Some pharmacy colleges/schools do not utilize PharmCAS and still require direct applications either alone or in combination with PharmCAS. Completion of an application on PharmCAS includes submission of an application fee, an online application, official transcripts, letters of reference, and test scores (including the PCAT). Not all pharmacy colleges/schools require applicants to submit scores for the PCAT5, and for international (non-US) applicants or students for whom English is a second language, the TOEFL (Test of English as a Foreign Language), is required.

Pharmacy colleges or schools may offer students acceptance into the professional program through an early assurance program. Students accepted with early assurance matriculate into the professional degree program upon successful completion of entrance requirements and application procedures. This program is referred to as “0-6,” as students are accepted into the professional pharmacy program, contingent upon the aforementioned requirements, during the undergraduate college application process. Similarly, programs may be “2-4”. The “2” describes the first 2 years of study necessary to complete the pharmacy prerequisite coursework. Students completing a “2-4” program must apply for admission into the professional pharmacy program. The application process usually begins after completion of the third semester of study for entry into the professional program the following fall.

Aside from the Pharm.D. program, many schools and colleges of pharmacy offer graduate degree programs (i.e., Master of Science [M.S.], Doctor of Philosophy [Ph.D.]) (see Pharmacy Education). Students enrolled in these programs are generally termed “graduate students,” while “pharmacy student” is generally reserved for students in the Pharm.D. programs. An M.S. or Ph.D. from a school or college of pharmacy does not qualify the recipient to sit for licensing exams and become a licensed pharmacist. The M.S. and Ph.D. degrees in pharmaceutical sciences are post-graduate degrees that focus on research and are offered by schools/colleges of pharmacy. The “major focus and design of the PhD degree program should be research-intensive to develop an independent pharmaceutical science researcher.” These degrees are accredited by regional and national accrediting bodies.

=== Professional coursework ===
After admission, a student will typically complete a four-year pharmacy program, although some schools offer accelerated three-year programs. The curriculum typically begins with courses in physiology and pathophysiology, medicinal chemistry, pharmacognosy, pharmacology and toxicology. Once a student is proficient in these core pharmaceutical sciences, instruction in evidence based therapeutic application of pharmacologic agents begins. Aside from usage of agents, students are taught to recognize and assess risk factors for disease, interpret clinical data and recognize interactions of drugs and disease states.

While most schools teach the core science courses separately, some schools take a systems-based approach, teaching all of the material from physiology to therapeutics for a particular body system before moving on to another. Augmenting the pharmaceutical sciences, courses in ethics, management, pharmacy law, communications, public health and advocacy are taught throughout the professional program.

In addition to didactic work, pharmacy education includes practice experiences. These experiences are generally directed by the school, conducted under the supervision of a preceptor and are intended to complement work done in the classroom. Introductory pharmacy practice experiences (IPPE) courses must comprise 5% of the curriculum and may take many forms, and introduce students to the practice of pharmacy. The final year of the curriculum generally consists entirely of the advanced pharmacy practice experiences (APPE). These experiences must account for 25% of the curriculum and allow the student the opportunity to practice in multiple environments under the supervision of a licensed pharmacist. Development of curricula for schools of pharmacy is guided by the standards set forth by ACPE. Successful completion of the practice experience objectives may yield academic credit and satisfy state pharmacy board requirements for internship. There are 7 standards that provide the framework and content for pharmacy school curricula. These standards allow interpretation by each school to develop coursework that aligns with the mission and goals of their respective institution. The last time the standards were updated was in 2015, to take effect in 2016. Most states also have their own policies that supplement the national standards.

Successful completion of the practice experience objectives may yield academic credit and satisfy state pharmacy board requirements for internship. Upon completion of all professional curriculum and practice experiences, the student will graduate and be awarded the Doctor of Pharmacy degree and typically seek licensure by examination. There are also multiple colleges/schools offering Dual-Degree Programs such as Pharm.D./MBA, Pharm.D./J.D., Pharm.D./M.D., Pharm.D./M.P.H., Pharm.D./P.A. and other advanced degrees like the M.S. in Pharmacy Administration. Pharmacists with baccalaureate training can also obtain a Pharm.D. degree through a nontraditional Pharm.D. program.

Upon completion of all professional curriculum and practice experiences, the student will graduate and be awarded the Doctor of Pharmacy (Pharm.D.) degree and typically seek licensure by examination.

=== Licensure ===
Pharmacists must be licensed by the state pharmacy board of the state in which they wish to practice, with one exception: A pharmacist with an active license may practice in a federal facility regardless of the state which issued the license.

In order to obtain an initial license, or license by examination, a candidate must have graduated from an AACP accredited school or college of pharmacy, satisfy requirements for internship, write and pass the North American Pharmacist Licensure Examination (NAPLEX), in some states write and pass the Multi-state Pharmacy Jurisprudence Exam (MPJE), and sometimes an additional state exam. Upon licensure, one may then be designated "Pharmacist" or "Registered Pharmacist" ("R.Ph."), as usage of these titles are generally regulated by state governments.

According to the ACPE, accreditation can be granted for the baccalaureate in pharmacy degree and the doctor of pharmacy degree. The doctor of pharmacy degree is designed to produce graduates who are “educationally prepared for practice and should satisfy educational requirements for licensure.” Students who receive a baccalaureate degree in pharmacy or pharmaceutical sciences are not eligible for licensure as a pharmacist. After obtaining a license, it must be periodically renewed by completing continuing education and other requirements as prescribed by the state of licensure.

=== Pharmacy School Accreditation ===
The Accreditation Council for Pharmacy Education (ACPE) was founded in 1932 as the accrediting body for schools of pharmacy in the United States. The mission of ACPE is “To assure excellence in education for the profession of pharmacy.” It is recognized for the accreditation of professional degree programs by the United States Department of Education (USDE) and the Council for Higher Education Accreditation (CHEA). Since 1975, ACPE has also been the accrediting body for continuing pharmacy education. The ACPE board of directors are appointed by the American Association of Colleges of Pharmacy (AACP), the American Pharmacists Association (APhA), the National Association of Boards of Pharmacy (NABP) (three appointments each), and the American Council on Education (one appointment). In order to obtain licensure in the United States, applicants for the NAPLEX must have graduated from an ACPE accredited school of pharmacy. ACPE publishes standards that schools of pharmacy must comply with in order to gain accreditation. There are currently 25 standards organized within six major categories of 1) mission, planning, and evaluation, 2) organization and administration, 3) curriculum, 4) students, 5) faculty and staff, 6) facilities and resources. A pharmacy school pursuing accreditation must first apply and be granted Pre-candidate status. These schools have met all the requirements for accreditation, but have not yet enrolled any students. This status indicates that the school of pharmacy has developed its program in accordance with the ACPE standards and guidelines. Once a school has enrolled students, but has not yet had a graduating class, they may be granted Candidate status. The expectations of a Candidate program are that they will continue to mature in accordance with stated plans. The graduates of a Candidate program are the same as those of fully accredited programs. Full accreditation is granted to a program once they have demonstrated they comply with the standards set forth by ACPE. The customary review cycle for established accredited programs is six years, whereas for programs achieving their initial accreditation this cycle is two years. These are comprehensive on-site evaluations of the programs. Additional evaluations may be conducted at the discretion of ACPE in the interim between comprehensive evaluationsA pharmacist in good standing may reciprocate an active licensure by examination to another state. Typically the requirements for licensure by reciprocity are less intensive and may require as little as passing an additional law exam.

=== Post-graduate work ===
A new pharmacy graduate may choose to complete an optional post-graduate residency (one to three years) rather than entering directly into pharmacy practice. A pharmacy residency consists of one to two years of general residency and one to two years of specialized residency. Residencies allow graduates to further hone their clinical skills in a structured environment. The first year of residency training is a general practice year and is referred to as post-graduate year one or "PGY-1." The second year of residency training, which is referred to as post-graduate year two or "PGY-2," is typically geared toward specialization in a specific therapeutic area, such as cardiology, pediatrics, infectious disease, etc. Residency programs may be accredited by the American Society of Health-system Pharmacists (ASHP). A list of accredited programs can be accessed via ASHP's website as well as ACCP's website.

== Zambia ==
According to the Zambia National Drug Policy of 1998 stated that ‘as a matter of urgency the government shall actively support the development of a Pharmacy Programme at University level in order to increase the output of suitably trained pharmacists’ In response to this mandate, the Bachelor of Pharmacy degree programme was established at the University of Zambia, School of Medicine in 2001. The Programme has been designed to run on a 5-year training pathway starting from the School of Natural Sciences at UNZA main campus. Texila American University Zambia offers a five years program the course comprises 4 years of theory and laboratory practice and a 5th year of compulsory, full-time in-service training in a community pharmacy and the pharmaceutical department of a hospital.

== Zimbabwe ==
In Zimbabwe pharmacists are trained at two universities, namely the University of Zimbabwe (which has been training pharmacists since the 1970s) and the Harare Institute of Technology. Both universities offer a four-year (Honours) undergraduate degree. After qualification, the graduates undertake a one-year pre-registration training under the auspices of the Pharmacists Council of Zimbabwe. They are then expected to do a year of community service at designated health institutions. Only after these two years do pharmacists in Zimbabwe get an open practising certificate.

There is also a requirement by the Pharmacists Council of Zimbabwe for all pharmacy graduates to undertake professional qualifying examinations before they can be registered as pharmacists as well as maintain registration status through continuing professional development activities.
