= Peepoodo & the Super Fuck Friends =

French comedy sex education animated series

- Also known as: Peepoodo & The Super Space Friends (season 2)
- Genre: Sex comedy; parody; adventure
- Created by: Balak
- Written by: Balak; Brice Chevillard; Nicolas Athané
- Screenplay by: Brice Chevillard; Nicolas Athané; Balak
- Story by: Brice Chevillard; Nicolas Athané; Balak
- Directed by: Balak
- Creative director: Balak
- Voices of: Brigitte Lecordier; Jeanne Chartier; Vincent Ropion
- Opening theme: "Peepoodo is in Love"
- Composer: Balak
- Country of origin: France
- Original language: French
- No. of seasons: 2
- No. of episodes: 26

Production
- Executive producer: David Alric
- Producer: Balak
- Running time: ~5 minutes
- Production company: Bobbypills

Original release
- Release: 16 July 2018 – 26 May 2021

Peepoodo & the Super Fuck Friends is a French adult animated series created by Balak and co-written by Brice Chevillard, Nicolas Athané and Balak. The series consists of comedic sex education cartoon shorts.

The series premiered on 16 July 2018 on the Blackpills website. After a campaign of crowdfunding on Kickstarter, a second season began production. Peepoodo is the second series produced by the animation studio Bobbypills.

== Premise ==
Peepoodo & the Super Fuck Friends explores "sexuality without taboos and in all its forms, including dicks and nipples." It also focuses on an unrestrained sexuality that ignores prejudices and intolerance.

At the end of the first season, Peepoodo destroys the earth, and in the second season he, accompanied by Dr. Pussycat, Evelyn and Tuffalo board a spaceship, looking for a planet to settle on, finding hostility in space. It is a science fiction adventure which can be described as "Star Trek with sex, full of plot twists and strong messages, dealing with the issues of today" and a variation of The Hitchhikers Guide to the Galaxy and Doctor Who with sexual themes.

== Characters ==
- Peepoodo (voiced by Brigitte Lecordier in French and Barbara Weber-Scaff in English), an anthropomorphic pink hamster, who wears only a chunky, yellow sweater.
- Dr. Monique Pussycat (known as Docteur Lachatte in French; voiced by Jeanne Chartier in French and Barbara Weber-Scaff in English), an anthropomorphic yellow tabby cat with pink hair and large breasts who works as a doctor in her own clinic. Until Evelyn transitioned, she was the only primary character who is fully clothed – usually in a white coat, in keeping with her role as physician. She also wears blue gloves, red panties and red high-heeled shoes. She supplies information relating to sex education in most episodes.
- Tuffalo (known as Grocosto in French; voiced by Brice Chevillard in French and Douglas Rand in English), a water buffalo with a muscular physique and a micropenis, who wears a pink tank top.
- Evelyn (voiced by Balak in French and David Gasman in English), a friendly trans polar bear. She was formerly known as Kevin until the episode "Dr. Peepoodo", in which Dr. Pussycat counsels her about being trans off-screen, after which Evelyn comes out. After transitioning, she favours a green sleeveless top worn over a black bra and cropped jeans.
- Lilifan (voiced by Léa Tcherniatinsky in French and Christine Ryndak in English), a shy and nervous blue elephant clad in a pink sleeveless shirt. She is presumed dead at the Season 1 finale, but is later revealed to be alive during Season 2 Episode 7.
- Beatrix Dominatrix (voiced by Léa Justum in French and Sharon Mann in English), the main antagonist at the end of each season, who seeks the "alpha male" Peepoodo. She is a large, anthropomorphic wolf with the physique of a female bodybuilder, who wears shiny, black thigh-high boots and a black bra.

== Production ==
Yves Bigerel, better known as Balak, talking about adult animation, with their projects not allowed on French television, stated that he was given the green light to begin the show by Blackpills.

For the English dub for the show, Jacqui Chappell and Nina Nevers worked on script adaption; Simón Hanukai is the voice and scripting director, Anais Khout mixes content; and Barbara Weber-Scaff, Sharon Mann, Christine Ryndak, Douglas Rand, David Gasman, Yves Bigerel, Brice Chevillard are the voice actors for the characters.

== Episodes ==
=== Series overview ===
Season	Episodes	Originally released	
Season	Episodes	First released	Last released
0	2	2017	12 December 2019
1	18	16 July 2018	5 September 2018
2	8	7 April 2021	26 May 2021

=== Shorts (2017–2019) ===
No. overall	No. in season	Title	Directed by	Written by	Storyboarded by	Original release date
0	1	"Pilot"	Balak	Balak	Balak	2017
A beer bottle is stuck in the stomach of a homeless man, but Dr. Pussycat can help Peepoodo.
0	2	"Crowdfunding"	Balak	Balak, Nicholas Athane & Brice Chevillard	Balak	11 December 2019
Kickstarter Trailer.

=== Season 1 (2018) ===
No. overall	No. in season	Title	Directed by	Written by	Storyboarded by	Original release date
1	1	"Vegetables"	Balak	Balak, Nicholas Athane & Brice Chevillard	Balak	16 July 2018
Peepoodo lectures Kevin on the importance of a balanced diet. Mr. and Mrs. Bunny are despondent after their vegetable garden is ravaged. Peepoodo turns detective, leading to Mr. Bunny revealing his penchant for the use, on himself, of vegetables as dildoes. Dr. Pussycat teaches the friends about the prostate gland.
2	2	"Basketball"	Balak	Balak, Nicholas Athane & Brice Chevillard	Balak	17 July 2018
After realizing she is bad at basketball, Lilifan is sad. Peepoodo tries to help but, when she attempts a slam dunk, she falls on him and he slides up her vagina, becoming wedged there with only one of his feet protruding. Pulling alone fails to dislodge him, but Dr. Pussycat comes to the rescue with a practical demonstration of female genital anatomy, involving combination of clitoral massage and pressure on Lilifan’s pubic bone. Peepoodo pops out and Lilifan scores a "basket" in a highly unorthodox way.
3	3	"Oktoberfest"	Balak	Balak, Nicholas Athane & Brice Chevillard	Balak	18 July 2018
Kevin has a very snotty nose. Peepoodo’s German, piggy penpal arrives in The Pretty Forest and introduces the friends to genital hygiene, urolagnia and a comically scatological version of Oktoberfest. While unfazed by urine and faeces he flees in horror from Kevin’s unhygienic snot, leaving behind two buxom German waitresses, who stay on with the friends in The (now excrement-covered) Pretty Forest. We learn some German and Tuffalo overcomes his initial xenophobia.
4	4	"Witch"	Balak	Balak, Nicholas Athane & Brice Chevillard	Balak	19 July 2018
Peepoodo, Kevin and Tuffalo spy on a beautiful fox woman while she’s bathing. She turns out to be a witch, who punishes their sexist, objectifying behaviour by turning them into walking, talking male genitalia. Dr. Pussycat fails to help them using medicine and they have to undertake a Tolkienesque quest involving Amazons who are prisoners of the Patriarchy, in order to regain their human(-ish) forms. Tuffalo spoils the happy ending with a final sexist comment.
5	5	"Papidoo & Mamidoo"	Balak	Balak, Nicholas Athane & Brice Chevillard	Balak	20 July 2018
Peepoodo is enjoying a visit to his grapefruit-obsessed grandparents. Grandpa has lost his sex drive despite taking viagra regularly. Dr. Pussycat, in superhero mode, flies to the rescue and shows off her bodily charms but Grandpa still cannot stay erect. All ends well when the Doctor forbids him grapefruit, pointing out that it can inactivate viagra. Immature Peepoodo is not comfortable with the reality of sexuality in older age.
6	6	"BaruBaru Chan"	Balak	Balak, Nicholas Athane & Brice Chevillard	Balak	21 July 2018
Peepoodo becomes addicted to a pornographic virtual reality game called BaruBaru Chan, imagining he’s in love with the main female character (who is a mere sock puppet for corporate greed). Drained of all self respect (and money) Peepoodo is drawn bodily into the world of the game (the Tron trope) and Dr. Pussycat, Kevin and Tuffalo have to enter it as avatars to defeat the exploitative character and rescue Peepoodo.
7	7	"Magic Tree"	Balak	Balak, Nicholas Athane & Brice Chevillard	Balak	22 July 2018
Peepoodo visits his friend Bernard, an old frog who is a librarian. Peepoodo borrows the forbidden book The Magic Tree which contains a map leading him to a hollow tree full of glory holes, which the male characters visit in order to masturbate and be fellated by Bernard. There is an unfortunate incident involving Peepoodo biting Kevin’s penis. Before (apparently) dying, Bernard explains ruefully that masturbation fantasies could be literary fiction’s last hope, because hardly anyone reads books anymore.
8	8	"Peepoodo Is in Love"	Balak	Balak, Nicholas Athane & Brice Chevillard	Balak	23 July 2018
While the friends are holding a poetry reading, Peepoodo feels confused and uncomfortable when listening to the guitar poet Tonio. Dr. Pussycat explains that he’s in love. Peepoodo and Tonio have gay sex, but Tonio later turns out to be bisexual and promiscuous. Dr. Pussycat then explains sexual jealousy to Peepoodo and Kevin and Tuffalo later commiserate with him.
9	9	"Street Party"	Balak	Balak, Nicholas Athane & Brice Chevillard	Balak	24 July 2018
The Pretty Forest throws a street party featuring Dr. Pussycat and her rock band. Peepoodo, Kevin and Tuffalo fall out over a silly playlet about mushrooms that they’re trying to perform. Dr. Pussycat suggests they present instead an entertainment about something that really matters to them, whereupon she plays her guitar and joins all her friends in improvising a happy song about STDs and the importance of sexual hygiene, in which everyone presents a horribly graphic display of their symptoms and Dr. P. proposes cures - only to develop a rash when kissed by Peepoodo!
10	10	"Pandas"	Balak	Balak, Nicholas Athane & Brice Chevillard	Balak	25 July 2018
Peepoodo, Kevin, and Tuffalo become Dr. Pussycat’s interns. Two pandas - hipsters who want to have children - come in for help. Mrs. Panda’s window of fecundity is fast closing and Dr. Pussycat tries to arouse them into having sex with pornographic videos, bondage gear and dildoes, resorting finally to masturbating them herself - all to no avail. Much to her disapproval, a dubious aphrodisiac bought from an online pharmacy brings success, thanks to Tuffalo and Peepoodo. Mrs. Panda has a baby boy.
11	11	"Night of the Waxed"	Balak	Balak, Nicholas Athane & Brice Chevillard	Balak	26 July 2018
The Pretty Forest is inundated with billboards for a brand of epilator. Almost all the characters fall for the hype, believing that pulling out their fur and feathers is both hygienic and sexy. Dr. Pussycat decries this silly fashion, teaching Peepoodo to resist peer pressure and that pubic hair cushions skin from harm, while pulling it out can lead to infections. She’s proved right when the depilated characters develop a plague that sends them zombie-crazy. With Peepoodo’s help she cures them. Fickle fashion swings the opposite way toward ultra-hairiness.
12	12	"A Christmas Crime"	Balak	Balak, Nicholas Athane & Brice Chevillard	Balak	27 July 2018 (Part 1); 1 August 2018 (Part 2)
13	13	"A Christmas Crime"	Balak	Balak, Nicholas Athane & Brice Chevillard	Balak	27 July 2018 (Part 1); 1 August 2018 (Part 2)
Part 1: The Inquest: Father Christmas has been found tied, with festive fairy lights, to a tree in The Pretty Forest. He has bled to death after being castrated by double orchiectomy. Dog policeman Maurice le Police and his pug sidekick, Eugene, investigate, while Dr. Pussycat conducts the autopsy. Suspicion falls on Peepoodo after he is accused by an ‘anonymous informant’ (Tuffalo seen in silhouette and with his voice electronically altered). The police extract a forced confession from Peepoodo. Part 2: The Trial: Peepoodo is brought to trial for the murder. Dr. Pussycat proves that he can’t be the murderer, because he’d have been too short to reach the victim’s testicles. Tuffalo confesses that HE is the culprit, having castrated the victim in a fit of drunken rage. The victim’s false beard slips off revealing him to be, not Santa, but Bernard, the frog librarian who appeared to have died at the end of episode 7. Peepoodo and Tuffalo are acquitted of the murder of Santa. The murderer of Bernard is revealed to be officer Eugene, when he hangs the severed testicles on the police station Christmas tree as decorations.
14	14	"Dr. Peepoodo"	Balak	Balak, Nicholas Athane & Brice Chevillard	Balak	8 August 2018
Doctor Pussycat takes a day off, leaving Peepoodo in charge. Patients seek help with foreign bodies stuck in various bodily orifices and Kevin confesses to having gender dysphoria. Peepoodo fondly imagines he’s helping until Lilifan enters, complaining of stomach pain. Peepoodo and Tuffalo panic when she lets out a torrential spray of menstrual blood. Dr. Pussycat reassures Kevin at the bus stop and helps him to transition to Evelyn. Back at the surgery Peepoodo and Tuffalo are holding a bizarre magico-religious ritual, believing Lilifan to be possessed. Dr. P. calms them down and explains menstruation. Evelyn introduces herself and the friends welcome her.
15	15	"Alone at Last"	Balak	Balak, Nicholas Athane & Brice Chevillard	Balak	15 August 2018
Left to his own devices, Tuffalo decides to enjoy a quiet afternoon masturbating. It takes a while to find some internet pornography that appeals. All is going well when suddenly Peepoodo knocks at the door. Tuffalo tells him to go away because he’s ill. The laptop blows up and Tuffalo tries a phone sex line instead. Crossed lines lead to comic confusion. Let down by tech and bereft of pornographic magazines, Tuffalo has to resort to using just his imagination (!) After some false starts Tuffalo succeeds in imagining a pair of breasts, but, just as he’s reaching orgasm, Peepoodo knocks again and ruins the moment.
16	16	"Sexo Dingo"	Balak	Balak, Nicholas Athane & Brice Chevillard	Balak	22 August 2018
This entirely audio episode features Dr. Pussycat and Tuffalo hosting an edition of the phone-in show Sexo-Dingo, broadcast on the Pretty Forest radio station Cone Pine Radio. Tuffalo manages to offend several female callers with his crass, unreconstructed male attitude to female sexuality and inferiority complex regarding his micropenis. Dr. Pussycat saves the day by explaining the function of the clitoris and giving Tuffalo a practical demonstration culminating in her having an on-air orgasm. Tuffalo has a (somewhat short-lived!) epiphany in response.
17	17	"Apocalypse"	Balak	Balak, Nicholas Athane & Brice Chevillard	Balak	29 August 2018 (Part 1); 5 September 2018 (Part 2)
18	18	"Apocalypse"	Balak	Balak, Nicholas Athane & Brice Chevillard	Balak	29 August 2018 (Part 1); 5 September 2018 (Part 2)
Part 1: Tuffalo and Evelyn are smoking cannabis and drinking beer while listening to their boombox when Peepoodo arrives on his little pink scooter. They announce that they’re now punks, belittle him and dare him to visit the Dangerous Forest, but, when he does so, they follow him to make sure he’s OK. A shower of pine cones thrown by kinky, bondage-clad, sex machine-augmented squirrels heralds the arrival of Beatrix Dominatrix, who insults the 3 friends and threatens to castrate Peepoodo. All the talk of his being a baby drives him crazy and causes his penis to grow colossal. Deeply impressed, Beatrix sweeps him on to her Harley Davidson chopper and they drive off leaving Tuffalo and Evelyn aghast. Part 2: Newly-endowed with a colossal penis, Peepoodo, now calling himself Peepoodur (hard Peepoodo) and become a caped supervillain, embarks on a cocaine-fuelled orgy of wild sex with Beatrix. Taking advantage of his eventual temporary sexual exhaustion, Dr. Pussycat runs some tests on him, discovering that he’s suffering from an extreme and life-threatening form of priapism, in which his gigantic penis has completely taken over his brain. The only cure is to aspirate all the blood from his engorged member with a huge hypodermic syringe. After a failed taser attack on Peepoodo by the police and a diversionary attempt to reason with him by Dr. P., Tuffalo nearly loses his life in curing his friend, causing an apocalyptic explosion. The friends celebrate Peepoodo’s return to normality, but the Earth has been shattered and the friends are left drifting into space in Dr. P.’s surgery, still clinging to a fragment of the former planet.

=== Peepoodo & the Super Space Friends, Season 2 (2021) ===
No. overall	No. in season	Title	Directed by	Written by	Storyboarded by	Original release date
19	1	"Amaflix+"	Balak	Balak, Nicholas Athane & Brice Chevillard	Balak	7 April 2021
After destroying Earth with his cock, Peepoodo wanders through space with his friends Evelyn, Tuffalo and Doctor Pussycat. Stuck in the Doctor's office, without propulsion and with a far from secure sealing from the galactic vacuum, our heroes are left in very dire straits.
20	2	"Handjob's Tale"	Balak	Balak, Nicholas Athane & Brice Chevillard	Balak	14 April 2021
As the crew make their mark on their ship, Tuffalo mistakenly ejects into space one of his most precious possessions: the "Doctor Pussycat - Cumshot Cumpilation vol 12" VHS.
21	3	"In Space No One Can Hear You Cream"	Balak	Balak, Nicholas Athane & Brice Chevillard	Balak	21 April 2021
Our friends decide to pick up a stellar hitchhiker who clearly feel under the weather.
22	4	"Body Swap"	Balak	Balak, Nicholas Athane & Brice Chevillard	Balak	28 April 2021
The atmosphere is heavy in the ship, because the Doctor Pussycat and Tuffalo are arguing all the time. Peepoodo and Evelyn decide to go shopping to get away from it all.
23	5	"Œustrus Maximus"	Balak	Balak, Nicholas Athane & Brice Chevillard	Balak	5 May 2021
Our friends are down on a tropical planet populated by strange creatures.
24	6	"The Onn-aka Tournament"	Balak	Balak, Nicholas Athane & Brice Chevillard	Balak	12 May 2021
Our crew arrives on a planet where the Onn-Aka is supposed to be. They fall in the middle of the Onn-Aka Tournament, the event that brings together the greatest sex warriors of all time to face Quantrix, the undefeated champion. The episode is also known as "Onnaka Trilogy: Part 1".
25	7	"How to Train Your Penis"	Balak	Balak, Nicholas Athane & Brice Chevillard	Balak	19 May 2021
Doctor Pussycat, Evelyn and Tuffalo are prisoners of Beatrix in her spaceship and realize with horror that she controls all their friends of the Pretty Forest. The episode is also known as "Onnaka Trilogy: Part 2".
26	8	"The Onn-Aka"	Balak	Balak, Nicholas Athane & Brice Chevillard	Balak	26 May 2021
As the relationship between Peepoodo and Beatrix reaches its peak, the entire universe threatens to collapse. The episode is also known as "Onnaka Trilogy: Part 3".

== See also ==
- History of French animation
- History of animation
