= .pharmacy =

Generic top-level domain reserved for pharmacies

The generic top-level domain (gTLD) .pharmacy was launched by the National Association of Boards of Pharmacy (NABP) in 2014. The goal was to "provide consumers around the world a means for identifying safe, legal, and ethical online pharmacies and related resources".

== Motivation ==
A review by the NABP of more than 10,800 websites selling prescription drugs "found that nearly 97% do not follow pharmacy laws and standards established to protect the public health". The NABP declared that it would only issue .pharmacy web addresses to "legitimate website operators that adhere to pharmacy laws in the jurisdictions in which they are based".

== Criticism ==
The impartiality of the domain was questioned, because Eli Lilly and Company, Merck & Co., and Pfizer are the main contributors to the NABP application. Previously, the application was challenged by Public Citizen, Knowledge Ecology International, and the Canadian International Pharmacy Association.
