= Online pharmacy =

Pharmacy that operates over the Internet

An online pharmacy, internet pharmacy, or mail-order pharmacy is a pharmacy that operates over the Internet and sends orders to customers through mail, shipping companies, or online pharmacy web portal.

Online pharmacies include:

- Legitimate Internet pharmacies in the same country as the person ordering.
- Legitimate Internet pharmacies in a different country than the person ordering. This type of pharmacy is usually licensed by its home country and follows those regulations, not those of the international orders.
- Illegal or unethical internet pharmacies. The web page for an illegal pharmacy may contain lies about its home country, procedures, or certifications. The "pharmacy" may send outdated (expired shelf life) or counterfeit medications and may not follow standard procedural safeguards.

== Home delivery ==
Conventional brick and mortar pharmacies usually have controlled drug distribution systems from the manufacturer, sufficient validation, and follow good distribution practices. Home delivery of pharmaceuticals can be a desirable convenience, but sometimes it can lead to problems with uncontrolled distribution.

The shipment of drugs through the mail and parcel post is sometimes a concern for temperature-sensitive pharmaceuticals. Uncontrolled shipping conditions can include high and low temperatures outside the listed storage conditions for a drug. For example, the US FDA found the temperature in a mailbox in the sun could reach 136 °F (58 °C) while the ambient air temperature was 101 °F (38 °C).

Shipment by express mail and couriers reduces transit time and often involves delivery to the door, rather than a mailbox. The use of insulated shipping containers also helps control drug temperatures, reducing risks to drug safety and efficacy.

== Risks and concerns ==
- Illegal or unethical pharmacies sometimes send outdated, substituted, or counterfeit medications to the person who ordered the drug instead of the real medication.
- Sometimes, an online pharmacy may not be located in a country that is claimed. For example, one study of drug shipments claiming to be from Canada revealed many of the drugs actually originated in several other countries and were often false medications.
- Minors can order controlled substances without adult supervision.
- Other concerns include potential lack of confidentiality, improper packaging, inability to check for drug interactions, and several other issues.

The British Community Pharmacy Patient Safety Group was concerned that online pharmacies should implement "appropriate safeguards" to protect patient safety, "particularly when prescribing and dispensing medicines that are liable to abuse, misuse and overuse". The coroner in Leicester investigating a death found that a patient requesting drugs "has potential access to multiple online pharmacies", each of which "have no knowledge of what each other have been prescribing".

== Discussion ==
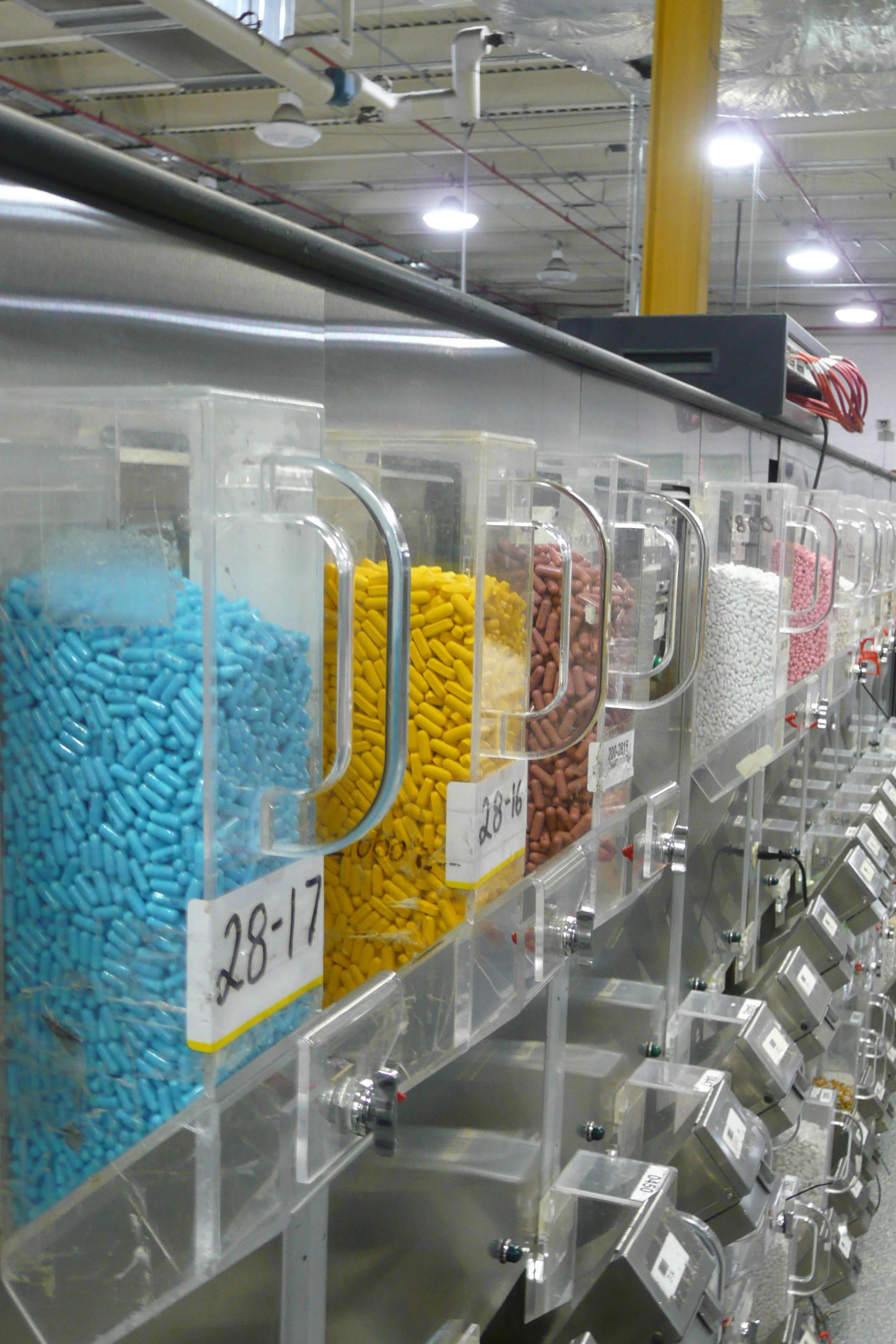
Canisters containing pharmaceuticals are loaded into an automatic dispensing machine at a mail-order pharmacy.

Legitimate mail-order pharmacies are somewhat similar to community pharmacies; one primary difference is the method by which the medications are requested and received. Some customers consider this to be more convenient than traveling to a community drugstore, in the same way as ordering goods online rather than going to a shop.

While many Internet pharmacies sell prescription drugs only with a prescription, some do not require a written prescription, as prescriptions may not be necessary in some countries. Some customers order drugs from such pharmacies to avoid the cost and inconvenience of visiting a doctor or to obtain medications their doctors are unwilling to prescribe. People living in the United States and other countries where prescription medications are costly may turn to online pharmacies to save money. Online pharmacies in the United States are required to be approved by the National Association of Boards of Pharmacy (NABP). Many of the reputable websites employ their in-house physicians to review the medication request and write a prescription accordingly. Some websites offer medications without a prescription or a doctor review. This practice has been criticized as potentially dangerous, especially by those who feel that only doctors can reliably assess contraindications, risk/benefit, and the suitability of a medication for a specific individual. Pharmacies offering medication without requiring a prescription, doctor review, or supervision are sometimes fraudulent and may supply counterfeit, ineffective, and possibly dangerous medicines.

== International consumers ==
International consumers sometimes purchase drugs online from online pharmacies in their own countries or those located in other countries. A distinct increase in the frequency of buying medicines and health products online was measured since the breakout of the COVID-19 pandemic. Some of these pharmacies require prescriptions while others do not. Of those that do not require prescriptions, some ask the customer to fill in a health questionnaire with their order. Many drugs available at legitimate online pharmacies are produced by well-known manufacturers such as Pfizer, Wyeth, Roche, and generic drug makers Cipla and Ranbaxy of India and Teva Pharmaceutical Industries of Israel. However, it remains difficult for a patient to ascertain whether an online pharmacy is legitimate. Medicines obtained from rogue online pharmacies come with no guarantees concerning their identity, history, and source. A study in three cities in the Netherlands found that over 60% of the consumed sildenafil was obtained from illegal sources. Roger Bate from the American Enterprise Institute tested hundreds of prescription drug orders purchased over the Internet and discovered that properly credentialed online pharmacies, ones selling domestically and internationally, only sell lawfully-manufactured medicines.

== U.S. consumers ==
Drug costs are a big point of attraction for online pharmacies. Shoppers can sometimes obtain 50 to 80 percent or more savings on U.S. prices at foreign pharmacies. The "Washington Post" reported that "millions of Americans have turned to Mexico and other countries in search of bargain drugs" and that "U.S. Customs estimates 10 million U.S. citizens bring in medications at land borders each year. An additional 2 million packages of pharmaceuticals arrive annually by international mail from Thailand, India, South Africa, and other countries. Still, more packages come from online pharmacies in Canada." According to a Wall Street Journal/Harris Online poll in 2006, 80 percent of Americans favor importing drugs from Canada and other countries. Factors independently associated with importation by U.S. residents are age greater than 45 years, south or west region of residence, Hispanic ethnicity, college education, poor or near-poor poverty status, lack of U.S. citizenship, travel to developing countries, lack of health insurance, high family out-of-pocket medical costs, trouble finding a healthcare provider, fair or poor self-reported health status, filling a prescription on the Internet, and using online chat groups to learn about health. Former US President Barack Obama's budget supported a plan to allow people to buy cheaper drugs from other countries. A 2016 study suggested that providing health insurance coverage may significantly reduce personal prescription drug importation and the subsequent risk of exposure to counterfeit, adulterated, and substandard medications. Furthermore, health insurance coverage is likely to be particularly effective at reducing importation among Hispanic persons; those born in Latin America, Russia, or Europe; and people that traveled to developing countries. A report in the journal Clinical Therapeutics found that U.S. consumers face a risk of getting counterfeit drugs because of the rising Internet sales of drugs, with worldwide counterfeit drug sales, offline and online, projected to reach $75 billion by 2010. In 2015 the Organisation for Economic Co-operation and Development (OECD) estimated that counterfeit sales approximated around $200 billion US in 2013.

Independent research published by the National Bureau of Economic Research demonstrates that online pharmacies, U.S. and foreign, verified by certain credentialing entities, sell genuine medication and require a prescription. In that study, all tested prescription drug orders were found to be authentic when ordered from online pharmacies approved by pharmacychecker.com (both international and U.S.-only); U.S. online pharmacies approved by the NABP, Verified Internet Pharmacy Practice Sites (VIPPS) program, or LegitScript; and Canadian-based online pharmacies approved by the Canadian International Pharmacy Association. Nine percent of tested products ordered from uncredentialed online pharmacies were counterfeit.

There are two verification programs for online pharmacies that are recognized by the National Association of Boards of Pharmacy (NABP). One is VIPPS, which is operated by the NABP and was created in 1999. The Food and Drug Administration (FDA) refers to Internet users interested in using an online pharmacy to the VIPPS program. The other is LegitScript, which as of September 2010 had approved over 340 Internet pharmacies as legitimate and identified over 47,000 "rogue" Internet pharmacies. Canadian and all non-U.S. online pharmacies that sell prescription medication to Americans, regardless of credentials, are not eligible for approval in the VIPPS and LegitScript programs.

=== Overseas online pharmacies and U.S. law ===
Legality and risks of purchasing drugs online depend on the specific kind and amount of drug being purchased.

The FDA believes that organized criminal networks control many online pharmacies that sell illegal pharmaceutical products without prescriptions. In 2014, The U.S. FDA, in partnership with other federal and international agencies and technology companies like Google, took action against websites that were selling drugs to U.S. consumers. Mail Order Pharmacies are regulated by the federal laws of the U.S. and hundreds of them operate legally in the US.

The U.S. FDA believes that ICANN should do more to block and seize what the agency views as illegal online pharmacy websites. ICANN has articulated the position that it does not have the organizational mandate to take down online pharmacies, stating in one post on its website, "that ICANN is not a court and is not empowered to resolve disputes when parties disagree over what constitutes illegal activity in multiple countries around the world." The Electronic Frontier Foundation, a non-profit organization defending civil rights on the Internet, views the influence of the pharmaceutical industry on the Internet as a form of censorship that threatens the ability of American consumers to access medicines in other countries purchased from online pharmacies that sell legitimate medicines.

A proposal called the Safe Importation Action Plan would allow states, wholesalers and pharmacies, but not patients, to buy drugs from Canada.

=== Enforcement in the U.S. ===
- It is illegal to purchase controlled substances from an overseas pharmacy. A person purchasing a controlled substance from such a pharmacy may be violating several federal laws that carry stiff penalties.
- Any package containing prescription drugs may be seized by U.S. Customs and Border Protection. The package may be held and eventually returned to the sender if the addressee does not respond and provide proof that they are allowed to receive these drugs (e.g., a valid prescription). In practice, the number of packages containing prescription drugs sent to the United States daily far exceeds CBP's capabilities to inspect them. In the past, packages often passed through customs even if they were not sent from Canada or otherwise didn't meet the requirements of section 844 of 21 USC. In 2006, some Canadian pharmacies reported that "as much as 5 percent" of orders from American consumers were being seized.
- The DEA and the FDA generally do not target consumers unless drugs are imported in large quantities (suggesting an intent to distribute) or represent a perceived danger to public health (opiates, amphetamines).
- Rarely, drug importation laws are enforced on the local level. For example, in June 2005 in Baton Rouge, Louisiana, several customers in online pharmacies were arrested by local law enforcement officers and charged with possession of a controlled substance without a prescription.
- The act of the importation of the controlled substance from overseas violates 21 USC, Section 952 (up to 5 years in prison and $250,000 fine for the importation of non-narcotic Schedule III, IV, or V drugs; possibly more for narcotics and Schedule I and II drugs). The act of simple possession of a controlled substance without a valid prescription violates 21 USC, Section 844 (up to 1 year in prison and $1,000 fine). The FDA does not recognize online prescriptions: for a prescription to be valid, there must be a face-to-face relationship between the patient and the healthcare professional prescribing the drug. What exactly constitutes a "face-to-face" relationship is considered by many online pharmacies to be a subjective definition that would allow them to operate as an adjunct to the patient's physician if the patient submits medical records documenting a condition for which the requested medication is deemed appropriate for treatment. Sections 956 and 1301 provide exemptions for travellers who bring small quantities of controlled substances in or out of the country in person but not by mail.
- Importation of an unapproved prescription drug (not necessarily a controlled substance) violates 21 USC, Section 301(aa), even for personal use. The Food, Drug, and Cosmetic Act does allow for the importation of drug products for unapproved new drugs for which there is no approved American version. However, this allowance does not allow for the importation of foreign-made versions of U.S. approved drugs.
- The law further specifies that enforcement should be focused on cases in which the importation by an individual poses a threat to public health, and discretion should be exercised to permit individuals to make such importations in circumstances in which the prescription drug or device imported does not appear to present an unreasonable risk to the individual.
- It is also illegal to import non-approved drugs (21 USC sections 331(d) and 355(a)); however, FDA policies suggest that, under certain circumstances, patients may be allowed to keep these drugs.
- Individual U.S. states may implement laws regulating importation, possession, and trafficking in prescription drugs and controlled substances.
- For several years, the states of Nevada, Minnesota, Illinois and Wisconsin have run official state programs to help their residents order lower-cost drugs from abroad to save money.

==== Mail fraud ====
All online pharmacies sell through the Internet but must ship the product usually via mail. The selling of many class (schedule) drugs without a valid prescription (also called Rx-only drugs or legend drugs) is illegal, and companies shipping them by mail can be prosecuted for mail fraud (Postal Inspection Service) as well as being investigated and federally charged by the DEA, IRS, Homeland Security, Food and Drug Administration's Office of Criminal Investigations, Department of Justice, INTERPOL, and the U.S. Immigration and Customs Enforcement (ICE), and it is common practice for many agencies to jointly investigate alleged crimes.

== Bulgarian consumers ==
All Bulgarian online pharmacies must be registered with the Bulgarian Drug Agency (BDA), which controls the medicine trade and reviews when there is doubt in drug quality and safety. A special BDA logo and a certificate for registration of pharmacy prove the accreditation and the legitimacy of the store. Clicking on the logo takes the consumer to the official page of the Bulgarian drug agency. The web page must deliver information about the pharmacy's name, address, registration number, and its manager.

== Canadian online pharmacies selling to United States customers ==
Buying prescription drugs from even the most well-respected internet pharmacies in Canada often results in a prescription filled from drugs sourced not from Canada but Caribbean nations or from Eastern Europe. The Canadian online pharmacy that sells the drugs offers them at Canadian prices but buys at a still cheaper rate from third parties overseas; this has led to problems with prescriptions being filled with counterfeit drugs. Some pharmacists have left the business because of the ethical issues involved. In 2014, the largest online Canadian drug retailer was prohibited from selling wholesale drugs by Health Canada. Of the three primary entrepreneurs of online Canadian drugs sold to the United States, one has been imprisoned, one left the industry, and the third is under investigation for criminal wrongdoing. The same errors have occurred in U.S. pharmacies, notably CVS. For more about this, see "Canada Drugs' history and closure."

== Indian consumers ==
"[A lack of] regulatory control over drug advertisements on television or the Internet" combined with a growing E-commerce in India has led to a significant increase in the use of online pharmacies. The Indian government is planning to spend ₹5 billion ($70.5 million U.S.) on computer literacy projects for 5 million people over 3 years in order to help Indian citizens access government services in the fields of e-education, e-health, and e-governance. Health care providers in India were also expected to spend ₹78.92 billion ($1.1 billion U.S.) on IT products and services in 2014. These technologies could aid the country in meeting their healthcare objectives.

=== Legal status in India ===
While there are no laws specifically targeting online pharmacies in India, various laws govern online pharmacies indirectly. The Drugs and Cosmetics Act (1940) and the Drugs and Cosmetics Rules (1945) contain guidelines concerning the sale of Schedule H and Schedule X drugs, which can only be obtained through prescription. There are also specific rules for labeling and barcoding.

It appears that electronic prescriptions should be valid, especially in the light of the Pharmacy Practice Regulations-2015 declared by the Pharmacy Council of India in January 2015. In these regulations, "prescription," as defined by regulation 2, (j)[3] means "a written or electronic direction from a Registered Medical Practitioner." Based on existing regulations, it appears that a scanned copy of a prescription would be considered as a valid prescription. However, whether such electronic prescriptions can be used to buy medicine from online pharmacies has been questioned.

The Maharashtra Food and Drugs Administration (FDA) raided 27 online pharmacies located in Mumbai, Thane, and Pune and seized drugs worth ₹2 million.

The Delhi High Court banned the online sale of medicines in the country on December 12, 2018 after listening to a Public Interest Litigation hearing by Dr. Ahmed Zaheer. This order illegalizes the sale of medicines through the Internet in India. The petitioner argued that the sale of medicines could only take place in licensed premises for which the licenses are issued under the Drug & Cosmetics Act 1940. Home delivery of medicines by online players is in contravention of the Act.

However, online pharmacies that are registered with the CDSO have continued to operate, arguing that they do not fall under the regulation because they function as marketplaces through which licensed third-party sellers sell products directly to consumers.

== Pakistani consumers ==
In 2015, the Drug Regulatory Authority of Pakistan Act passed for the registration of homeopathic, herbal, unani, allopathic, and nutraceutical products. This has also implied that only registered retail pharmacies can sell such items, along with OTC and Prescription medication, to the public.

The sale of all drugs in Pakistan is subject to the Drugs Act of 1976.

== UK consumers ==
In the U.K., online pharmacies are technically known as distance selling pharmacies.

In the U.K, more than 2 million people buy drugs regularly on the Internet from online pharmacies; some are legitimate, but others have "dangerous practices" that could endanger children. In 2008, the Royal Pharmaceutical Society of Great Britain (RPSGB) introduced a green cross logo to help identify accredited online pharmacies (from 2010 the internet pharmacy logo scheme is run by the GPhC).

European registered pharmacists have reciprocal agreements allowing them to practice in the U.K. by registering with the General Pharmaceutical Council.

The first online pharmacy in the U.K. was Pharmacy2U, which started operating in 1999. The UK is a frontline leader in internet pharmacies since a change to NHS pharmacy regulations in 2005 that made it legal for pharmacies to fill NHS prescriptions over the Internet. Drugs supplied in this way tend to be medicines which doctors refuse to prescribe for patients or would charge a private prescription fee, as all patients treated under the National Health Service (NHS) pay either a flat price or nothing for prescribed medicine (except for medicine classed as lifestyle medicine, e.g., antimalarials for travel) and medical equipment. Since July 2015 the Medicines and Products Regulatory Agency (MHRA) has required online sellers of medicines to adopt an E.U. wide logo and maintain an entry in the MHRA medicines sellers registry.

In the U.K., online pharmacies often link up with online clinic doctors. Doctors carry out online consultations and issue prescriptions. The company employing the doctors must be registered with the Care Quality Commission. Online clinics only prescribe a limited number of medicines and do not replace regular doctors working from surgeries. There are various ways the doctors carry out the online consultations; sometimes, it is done almost entirely by questionnaire. Customers usually pay one fee, which includes the price of the consultation, prescription, and the price of the medicine.

As of April 2016, there were 46 registered online pharmacies in England. In April 2017, the Care Quality Commission suspended the registration of Doctor Matt Ltd because of inadequate medical assessment of prescription requests. Six have been warned after inspections.

By 2019/20, there were 390 distance selling pharmacies in the U.K.

Pharmacy2U claimed in June 2018 that online dispensing could save the NHS up to £400 million a year, a claim disputed by other pharmacy organizations.

From 1 January 2021, as a result of Brexit, Great Britain (England, Wales and Scotland) based online pharmacies are no longer required to display the EU common logo (in the UK known as the Distance selling Logo).

== See also ==
- The Silk Road (anonymous marketplace), an online marketplace thought to facilitate the anonymous sale of illegal drugs
- Internet fraud
- .pharmacy (generic top-level domain)
- Counterfeit medicines online
