= Verified-Accredited Wholesale Distributors =

US program regulating drug distribution

Seal of VAWD-approved facilities

The Verified-Accredited Wholesale Distributors (VAWD) program was established in 2004 to help protect the public from the threat of counterfeit drugs.

The VAWD program was developed and is administered by the National Association of Boards of Pharmacy (NABP). The program offers an accreditation to wholesale distribution facilities by offering an objective, third-party audit system.

== Accreditation ==
The criteria to earn VAWD accreditation program includes a compliance review, criteria including: licensure verification, on-site survey and examination, screening through NABP's Clearinghouse, and criminal background checks for responsible persons.

The facility must employ security and best practices for safe distribution. Resurveys of accredited sites will be performed by trained NABP surveyors before accreditation may be renewed.

== See also ==
- Alliance Against Counterfeit Spirits
