= Pre-pharmacy =

Undergraduate pharmacy course in the United States

Pre-Pharmacy or Pre-Pharm is the term used for a 2-year undergraduate course that Pharmacy students must first complete before moving onward to a 4- or 3-year PharmD program within the United States.

The program is offered in a few different ways across the country. Within some colleges, the Pre-Pharmacy coursework is combined with the Pharm.D course for a 5 or 6-year program. Five year programs connect 2 years of Pre Pharmacy to an accelerated year round program. Six year programs deliver six tradition academic years which means summers are not used for the programs and are free of required classes. Colleges that do not offer this merged program may allow an undergraduate student to major (or minor) in Pre-Pharmacy. For schools where Pre-Pharmacy is not offered as a major or minor by itself, students usually major in a similar science (i.e. Chemistry) with a focus on Pre-Pharmacy, meaning that the curriculum of their particular major is tailored to help them get into a pharmacy school.

Each college has its own specific curriculum for Pre-Pharmacy students. A general curriculum would include Chemistry, either Biology or Anatomy and Physiology, Mathematics, English and various electives, which may include Physics or Anthropology. Specific curricula can generally be found on the individual college's website.

Some community colleges or junior colleges that offer a Pre-Pharmacy program for transfer to a university's pharmacy program will usually award an Associate of Science degree.
