= Prescribing pharmacist =

Pharmacist who is legally allowed to issue prescriptions

A prescribing pharmacist, also known as a pharmacist prescriber, is a pharmacist who is legally allowed to issue medical prescriptions for prescription-only medicines.

== By country ==
=== Canada ===
In Canada, the scope of practice for pharmacists varies by province. As of August 2024, pharmacists in the province of British Columbia can prescribe medications for minor ailments, adapt prescriptions written by other prescribers (with certain limitations), as well as order lab tests for further assessment.

=== United Kingdom ===
In the United Kingdom, the official term pharmacist independent prescriber is used. Pharmacist independent prescribers may prescribe any drug, including controlled drugs, with the exception of cocaine, diamorphine, and dipipanone.

=== United States ===
In the United States, regulations concerning pharmacist prescribers are made on a state-by-state basis.
