= Counterfeit medicines online =

Medical products sold via the Internet

The online distribution of counterfeit medicines has been growing during the last decades. The role of Internet as an unregulated medicine market is the main reasons behind this phenomenon, especially the effectiveness of "spam" as a tool for advertising and promoting these products. Websites and social media are new powerful instruments that organized criminal groups could exploit to conduct their illicit businesses. The spread of this emerging threat worldwide poses a very high risk for the health and safety of unaware consumers.

== Definition ==
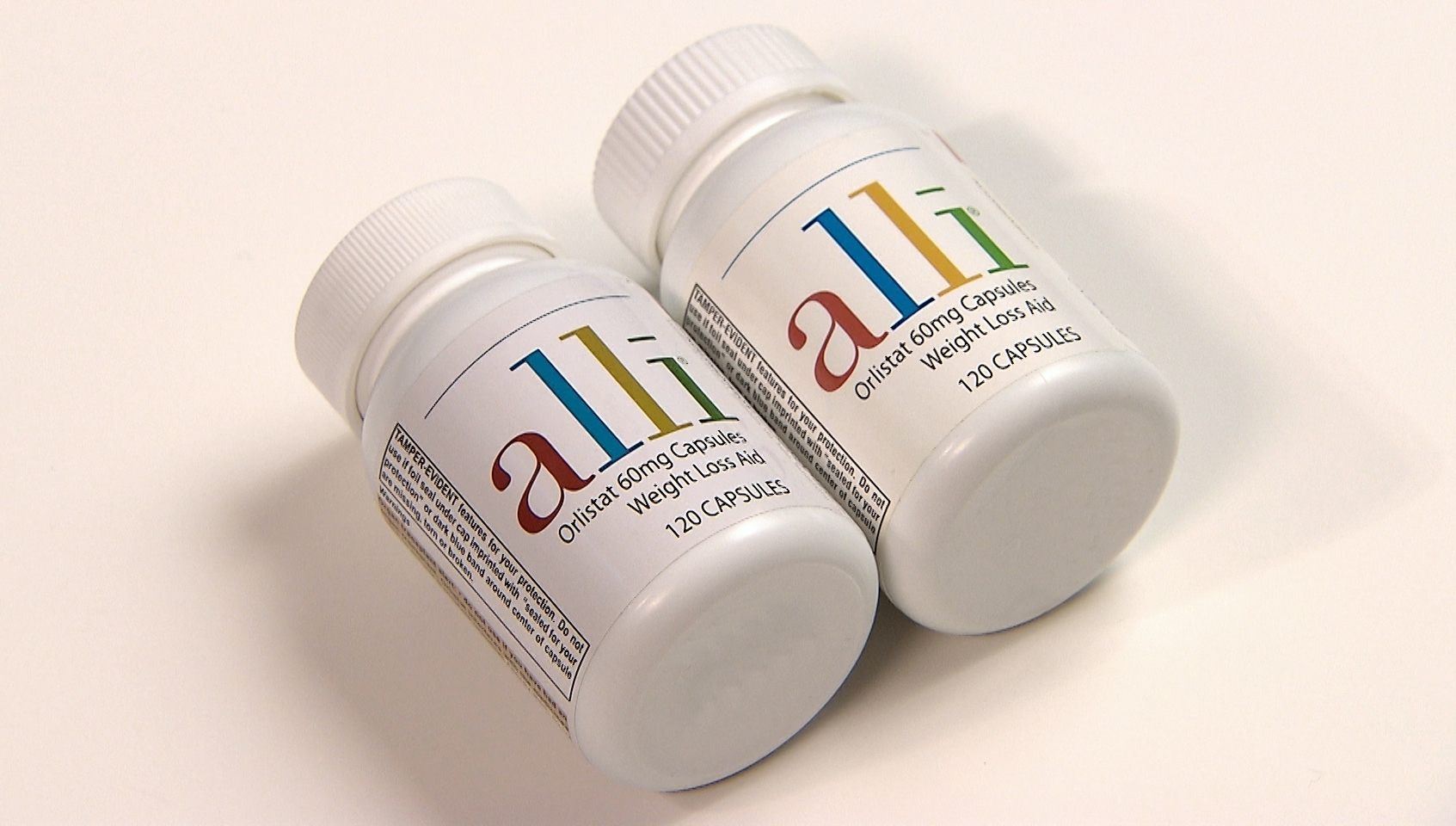
Two drug packages appear to be identical in normal light

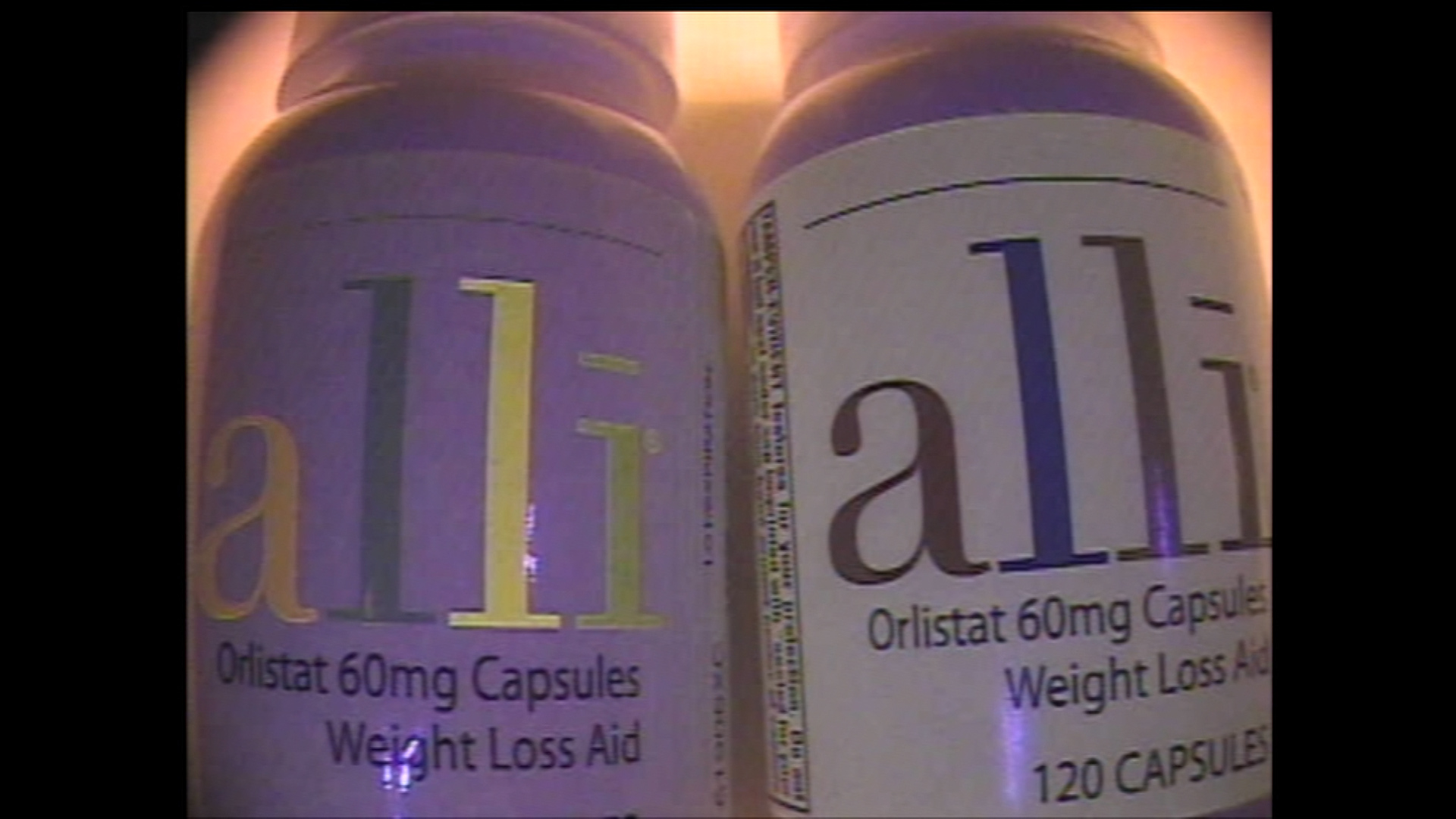
Selective UV wavelength identifies counterfeit package on left

On 29 May 2017, the World Health Assembly hosted by the World Health Organization agreed to have "Substandard and Falsified (SF) medical products" as the term to be used in all future documentation on the subject of substandard, spurious, falsified, falsely-labelled and counterfeit (SSFFC) medical products. Under this definition, a counterfeit medicine is a falsified pharmaceutical product. The term "counterfeit" is avoided as this is connected to intellectual property rights rather than public health. The meaning associated with "counterfeit medicines" incorporates various cases that are ascribable to the intentional replication of a product, or product parts, without permission.

== Role of the Internet ==
The Internet has radically changed the approach towards commerce, drastically modifying also buyers' attitudes towards the purchase of goods in general. Research has demonstrated that using a computer to fill a prescription online and using online chat groups to learn about health topics are strong independent predictors of prescription drug importation from foreign countries by United States consumers.

- Cheap prices are often the primary reason behind consumers' purchase decisions;
- Nonetheless, in the specific case of medicines the level of anonymity granted by the Internet is another driving motive pushing consumers to prefer online consumers (i.e. those people with diseases considered as taboos, such as sexual or psychological illnesses);
- Practical convenience is another good reason, as pharmaceuticals ordered online can be delivered directly to the consumer;
- Consumers can also find online a wider range of products, not always authorized in their own countries (illegal medicines).

If on the one side the Internet created new opportunities for consumers, on the other it also represents a new powerful instrument that organized criminals could exploit to conduct their illicit businesses. With the Internet criminals have found an emerging marketplace that could possibly be exploited in many different ways to take advantage of the almost unlimited possibilities offered by cyberspace. In recent years counterfeiters have been exploiting the Internet as an important channel to offer counterfeit medicines both at the wholesale and at the retail level, often creating an independent distribution process which directly targets distributors and final users.

At the wholesale, counterfeiter can exploit distributors' constant search for low costs products to maximize the profit. For what concerns the retail level, counterfeiters deceive consumers both with low prices and by sending a constant stream of spam messages to their e-mail inboxes. It is clear that the development of new communication technologies and the possibility of exploiting the massive Internet market, has unwillingly favored illegal activities.

== E-pharmacies ==
Many online pharmacies operate according to the regulations and with transparency. To them, criminals are competitors that advertise counterfeit drugs and damage the reputation of legitimate online pharmacies. The Internet plays a significant role in the worldwide diffusion of counterfeit pharmaceutical products. Accreditation systems were developed by institutions for online pharmacies, including those linked to physical ones, to combat these illegitimate activities (for instance in the US). However, these measures are limited. Accredited websites were to be affixed an official seal as a guarantee of legitimacy, but these could be easily imitated. The institutions in charge of these accreditations operate at national level, and due to different domestic laws, it has proven difficult to provide customers with reliable information concerning the legitimacy of these online shops.

An overview of the various typologies of illicit e-pharmacies is now presented, basically focused on rogue and fake e-pharmacies. Rogue e-pharmacies are those that not adhere to accepted standards of medicine and/or pharmacy practice, including standards of safety, thus violating regulations, and those that engage in fraudulent and deceptive business practices. They sell counterfeit pharmaceuticals through ad hoc designed websites which pretend authenticity and often contain features which aim to imitate legitimate ones. The impact of illicit e-pharmacies should not be underestimated: sewage epidemiology showed that >60% of the consumed sildenafil in the Netherlands was obtained from illegal sources. The consumers still seem unable to grasp the risks associated with this particular issue. This happens also because the issue of online sales of counterfeit medicines does not seem to receive due attention by the media. On the other side, through fake e-pharmacies cyber criminals do not really sell medicines, but only use them as baits to defraud online buyers, as in the case of ID theft and credit card cloning. The scheme implies a spider-web composed of numerous websites aiming to attract victims. The goal is to infect the computers of the latter with a virus to steal valuable data.

Both types of deceptive e-pharmacies - rogue and fake ones - are often efficiently promoted by spam messages, which work even better during times of health crisis, when people go into frenzy over certain types of medicines and when there is a surge of cyber criminals seeking to cash in on the pandemic.

== Deceiving strategies and tools used by criminals ==
The exploitation of the Internet by criminals caused the spread of uncontrolled and unverified pieces of information and products. Internet search engines, for instance, unwillingly contribute to keep illegal e-pharmacies in business. The struggle against rogue and fake online pharmacies requires combined efforts at different levels.

Besides the already mentioned "attractive factors". such as lower prices and anonymity, counterfeiters also use a variety of deceiving methods that are based on the fact that the potential buyers will never have the possibility to verify the authenticity of what is presented in the fake website. One of these elements is the logos of genuine online pharmacies, or the approval seal of controlling authorities. Moreover, to reassure potential consumers very often it is requested a medical prescription, as a requisite to purchase the online medicines. Thanks to these strategies, the phenomenon of counterfeit medicines sold online is more and more increasing. According to the EAASM (European Alliance for Access to safe Medicines) 6 times out of 10, medicines bought online turned to be fakes.

== International cooperation ==
With the launch of Operation Pangea in 2008, for the first time illegal online pharmacies were targeted at the international level. In particular, the operation targeted three main components used by illegal websites: the Internet service provider) the payment systems and the delivery service. Along the years the operation gained notable momentum as the number of the participating countries rose from 10 to more than 80 in 2011. The four operations Pangea carried out between 2008 and 2011 led to always increasing number of arrests and seizures all around the world. In 2011 Pangea IV was the largest operation of its kind, involving 165 agencies and leading to the seizure of 2.4 million illicit and counterfeit pills originating from 43 countries; the shutting down of 13,500 websites and the inspection of 45,000 packages.

Due to the almost unlimited possibilities offered by cyberspace, purchasing pharmaceuticals over the Internet is easy while, on the contrary, tracing the various phases within the distribution chain can be difficult. It is for this reason that cooperation among different law enforcement agencies in different countries becomes essential.

== Role of spam ==
Another interesting element to be analyzed is the role of spamming, to present how criminals are able to increase the possibility of success of their deceiving actions by reaching a greater number of potential victims and advertise their products. The term spam is used to describe the abuse of electronic messaging systems in order to indiscriminately send unsolicited bulk messages. The term unsolicited refers to the fact that the message is sent without a verifiable permission granted by the recipient. A message is considered bulk when it is sent as part of a larger collection of messages, all of which have an identical content. Spam is a problem of consent, rather than content. This is a significant element to take into consideration, as attempts to regulate contents of e-mail messages risk to contribute undermining the freedom of speech instead of efficiently fighting the phenomenon of spamming. 92% to 96% of e-mails received by most organizations are spam. Spam volumes around the world reach about 250 billion messages a day, that is to say almost 40 spam e-mail messages a day for each woman, man and child in the world. As it is a cheap and anonymous way to promote products on the Internet and since it also allows reaching a large number of people all over the world, spamming represents a very powerful advertising instrument. It is therefore one of the favorite ways used by organized crime to advertise their illegal activities and illicit products.

Online trade of counterfeit pharmaceuticals does not escape the rule and medicines are by all means among the most spammed online products. In particular, in some cases it is particular easy for spammers to take advantage of consumers' weaknesses. Some of the steps taken by organized criminals to make their operation effective are now presented.

- Once spammers have decided the product they want to illicit advertise – i.e. the medicine or a series of medicines – their next step is to reach an agreement with a website dealing with that type of medicines. The lists with e-mail addresses to be used as spam recipients are commonly sold between crackers and spammers. Such lists contain million of e-mail addresses, most of which are verified and known to be working.
- To avoid anti-spam filters, based on a list of "dirty words", the junk e-mails dealing with medicines could simply just contain an image. Since the filters are also designed to protect from certain types of images, the spammers have learnt how to create pictures which do not come out as JPEG files or similar thus being able to elude filters once again.
- As last step, the spammer only requires a software designed to send bulk e-mails (i.e. Dark Mailer)

In the past years several companies settled a series of actions against spammers. The various "joint actions" put in place are an important sign of the determination of the private sector to stop the misuse of the Internet for illegal purposes, nevertheless there are thousand of other smaller companies dealing with spamming on a daily basis that are unable to dispose of such amount of technological, financial and human resources to get engaged in such a fight.

== Involvement of organized crime ==
The interest of organized crime towards the illicit trafficking of counterfeit medicines is clearly demonstrated by figures. For instance, a pill of ecstasy costs between €0.20 and €0.30 and it is generally sold at €5. A Viagra pill costs around €0.15 and it is sold via an illicit website at around 8 to €10. A kilo of counterfeit Viagra pills (1,700 units) costs €255 and the retail value is from 13,600 to €17,000.

Organized crime is very much involved in the activity of many rogue and fake e-pharmacies all over the Internet, also through the spamming activity. Spamming is usually part of a wider criminal scheme: spam is a powerful advertising tool therefore organized criminals use it in order to expand their market. In this regard organized crime could rather be seen as a veritable illicit enterprise in which spammers hold the role of a sort of an advertising department.

Criminal operations over the Internet are clearly facilitated by the fact that it is indeed easy to register a domain name and to set up a website in a country, to create a back office in another one and to install an online shop in a third country, especially if one considers that many criminal groups operating at the transnational level already have established alliances and operate in several countries. Once the online shop is operational, it could as well easily direct payments to a fourth country and eventually invest the profits in a tax haven. Moreover, very often, in order to further confuse investigators, money is transferred between a chain of bank accounts, creating a smoke-screen which makes investigations more difficult.

== See also ==
- Authentication
- Security label
- 2025 Counterfeit medication scandal
