= National Association of Boards of Pharmacy =

American nonprofit trade association

- Abbreviation: NABP
- Founded: September 7, 1904; 121 years ago
- Founded at: Coates House Hotel, Kansas City, Missouri, U.S.
- Type: 501(c)(3)
- Tax ID no.: 36-1520565
- Legal status: Nonprofit organization
- Purpose: To assist member boards of pharmacy for the purpose of protecting public health.
- Headquarters: Mount Prospect, Illinois, U.S.
- Coordinates: 42.0776339°N 87.9141475°W
- Chairperson: Lenora S. Newsome
- President: Jeffrey J. Mesaros
- Executive Director: Lemrey "Al" Carter
- Subsidiaries: NABP Solutions LLC, National Association of Boards of Pharmacy Foundation
- Revenue: $46,171,815 (2022)
- Expenses: $43,177,367 (2022)
- Employees: 212 (2022)
- Volunteers: 9 (2022)
- Website: nabp.pharmacy

National Association of Boards of Pharmacy (NABP) is a 501(c)(3) nonprofit organization that assists member boards of pharmacy for the purpose of protecting public health. It has 54 active members and 12 associate members. Active member boards include all 50 United States, the District of Columbia, Guam, Puerto Rico, and the Virgin Islands. Associate member boards are The Bahamas, and 10 Canadian provinces. Australia was formerly an associate member but was removed in 2020.

NABP supports its member boards of pharmacy by offering:

- Examinations that assess pharmacists’ competency to practice pharmacy. These examinations include the North American Pharmacist Licensure Examination (NAPLEX) and the Multistate Pharmacy Jurisprudence Examination (MPJE).
- License transfer program that alleviates the administrative burden on boards by verifying pharmacists’ applications for license transfer,
- Accreditation programs that create uniform standards and perform inspections to supplement board staff and alleviate financial burden.
- Many other services that provide pertinent resources to assist the boards of pharmacy as they work to protect the public health each day.

== History ==
Representatives of twenty (Note: In attendance were representatives from Alabama, Arkansas, Colorado, Florida, Georgia, Indiana, Louisiana, Massachusetts, Missouri, Michigan, Mississippi, New York, Ohio, Oregon, Tennessee, South Dakota, Vermont, the Territory of Arizona, the Territory of New Mexico, and the District of Columbia.) state and territorial boards of pharmacy met at the Coates House Hotel in Kansas City, Missouri, on September 7, 1908. At the meeting, they formed the National Association of Boards of Pharmacy that would provide for interstate reciprocity in pharmaceutical licenses based on a uniform minimum standard of education and uniform legislation. It was intended to act independently from the American Pharmaceutical Association, as it would help resolve differences between state boards of pharmacy. NABP's constitution stated that the NABP would become operative when ten state or territorial boards of pharmacy had adopted the rules and regulations that had NABP adopted. George Reimann was elected its first president, and J. M. A. Laue was elected its first vice president.

NABP was incorporated in Kentucky on November 5, 1913. Its original governing board consisted of J. W. Gayle, E. Berger, M. G. Beehe, John Culley, and J. J Campbell.

In 1999, the NABP developed the Verified Internet Pharmacy Practice Sites (VIPPS) program to accredit online pharmacies. NABP says it looks at an online pharmacy's state licenses, its state inspection reports, and its procedures for dispensing of drugs when determining whether to accredit an online pharmacy, and it requires the online pharmacy to adhere to the VIPPS criteria and program requirements.

In 2004, the NABP developed the Verified-Accredited Wholesale Distributors (VAWD) program to accredit Wholesale Distributors and to help protect the public from the threat of counterfeit drugs.

In 2011, the NABP implemented a data exchange that allows authorized pharmacists, law enforcement agents, and regulatory boards to access patient-specific controlled substance prescription information. Known as NABP PMP InterConnect®, the platform provides a single page summary of patient's drug seeking activities across state lines. As of 2018, authorized users in 42 states have accessed data using the system in order to prevent drug abuse and drug diversion.

=== Top-level domain .pharmacy ===
In 2014, the NABP launched the generic top-level domain (gTLD) .pharmacy, "to provide consumers around the world a means for identifying safe, legal, and ethical online pharmacies and related resources".

The impartiality of the domain has been questioned, because Eli Lilly and Company, Merck & Co., and Pfizer are the main contributors to the NABP application. Previously, that application was challenged by Public Citizen, Knowledge Ecology International, and the Canadian International Pharmacy Association.
