= Pharmacy Examining Board of Canada =

National certification body

The Pharmacy Examining Board of Canada (PEBC), established by an Act of Parliament in 1963, is the national certification body for the profession of pharmacy in Canada. It currently assesses the qualifications of 2 pharmacy professional candidates seeking licensure - pharmacists and pharmacy technicians, on behalf the pharmacy regulatory authorities (PRAs) of all provinces except Quebec, and the Certificate of Qualification issued by the PEBC is a requirement to license in all provinces except Quebec. In Quebec, the Ordre des pharmaciens du Quebec conducts its own assessments of qualifications of applicants seeking licensure as a pharmacist.

== History ==
On December 21, 1963, royal assent was granted to a Canadian Act of Parliament incorporating the PEBC. This Act recognized the Board’s purposes of establishing qualifications for pharmacists acceptable to participating licensing bodies and of providing fair and equitable examinations for the issuance of certificates of qualification and registration of successful applicants.

== Pharmacists ==
=== International Pharmacy Graduates (IPGs) ===
Pharmacists who obtained their pharmaceutical education outside Canada or the United States, who wish to practice pharmacy in a province of Canada (except Quebec), are required to undergo a three-step assessment process whereby the PEBC evaluates the credentials of the applicant.

==== Document Evaluation ====
Document evaluation is the first step of the PEBC certification process for an IPG. The applicant is required to submit foreign pharmacy education credentials to the PEBC, whereby PEBC determines whether the education is equivalent to the education received by a pharmacy graduate in Canada. If this step is favourably completed, the applicant will be eligible to write the Pharmacist Evaluating Examination. If the PEBC deems the pharmaceutical education to be not equivalent, a full 4-year pharmacy program at a Canadian university is required should the applicant want to continue pursue licensure as a pharmacist.

==== Pharmacist Evaluating Examination ====
The Pharmacist Evaluating Examination is a multiple-choice exam that tests the knowledge of various areas of pharmacy included in a Canadian pharmacy education curriculum. The pass mark is 60, and applicant have 3 attempts to complete this exam. If an applicant fails the third attempt, they may file a petition for a fourth attempt after remediation. If an applicant is unsuccessful at the fourth attempt, the PEBC does not permit any additional attempts, and the applicant will not be able to move forward toward the PEBC certification process.

==== Pharmacist Qualifying Examination ====
After an applicant successfully completes the Pharmacist Evaluating Examination, they will be eligible to write the Pharmacist Qualifying Examination, which is the same exam required for domestic and U.S. graduates who wish to seek certification.

=== Domestic and U.S. Graduates ===
Domestic and U.S. graduates of a pharmacy program accredited by the CCAPP or ACPE respectively, are eligible to take the Pharmacist Qualifying Examination, and upon successful completion, will be issued a Certificate of Qualification. The Pharmacist Qualifying Examination has evolved considerably since the inception of the PEBC, and currently consists of 2 Parts: Part I (MCQ) and Part II (OSCE).

Part I (MCQ) is a 200-question multiple-choice exam taken on two half-day sittings. Part II (OSCE) is an objective structured clinical examination whereby candidates rotate through a series of stations and are required to complete station-specific tasks. The station scenarios reflect common and critical practice scenarios, and candidates are required to solve station-specific problems in a manner reflecting real world practice.
