= Multistate Pharmacy Jurisprudence Examination =

The Multistate Pharmacy Jurisprudence Examination (MPJE) is a pharmacy law examination created by the National Association of Boards of Pharmacy (NABP) in the United States to help individual state boards of pharmacy assess the competency and knowledge of pharmacy law. It is required as a prerequisite for a pharmacy license by 48 states and the District of Columbia. Arkansas, California, and Idaho utilize state administered examinations.
