= Knowledge Ecology International =

- Formation: 1995
- Founder: Ralph Nadar
- Headquarters: Washington, D.C.
- Website: https://www.keionline.org/

Knowledge Ecology International (KEI) is a non-governmental organization. It was founded by Ralph Nader in 1995 and was then called Consumer Project on Technology. It deals with issues related to the effects of intellectual property on public health, cyberlaw and e-commerce, and competition policy. It has fought the Microsoft monopoly, the ICANN monopoly, software patents, and business method patents. It has supported free software in government, open access for the Internet, and privacy regulation. KEI works on access to medicines, including a major effort on compulsory licensing of patents. Beginning in 2002, CPTech began to work with Tim Hubbard and others on a new trade framework for medical research and development (R&D).

In 2006, the MacArthur Foundation awarded KEI a MacArthur Award for Creative and Effective Institutions, saying in part:

KEI promotes balanced intellectual property polices in U.S. law and in international agreements and norms. It supports providing reasonable benefits and incentives to creators and owners, while making essential knowledge and goods accessible and affordable to the broadest possible public. It is an effective broker and guide in this increasingly complex debate and one that is sought out worldwide.

== See also ==
- Patent thicket
- Tragedy of the anticommons
