= NAPLEX =

The North American Pharmacist Licensure Examination (NAPLEX) is a standard examination created by the National Association of Boards of Pharmacy (NABP) to help individual state boards of pharmacy assess an individual's competency and knowledge so that they may be given a license to practice. The NABP has announced that as of November 2016, the fee to take the exam, the number of exam questions, and the time to sit for the exam have all increased.

== History ==
NABP started the development of a standardized national examination in 1958 by Dr. Fred T. Mahaffey. The effort led to the eventual formation of Blue Ribbon Committee in 1968 and Blue Ribbon Examination in 1971. Blue Ribbon Examination was renamed to the National Association of Boards of Pharmacy Licensure Examination (NABPLEX) in 1975. All state boards of pharmacy with the exception of California used NABPLEX by 1986. In March 1997, the NABPLEX was renamed to the NAPLEX. California recognized the NAPLEX in 2004. Until 1997, the examination was in a paper and pencil format utilized since 1976 which was replaced with a computer-adaptive test administered at contracted testing centers.

== Exam Format ==
The NAPLEX is exclusively a computer-administered exam. After receiving an authorization to test from NABP, applicants must register with an official testing facility, such as Pearson VUE, at least two business days in advance to schedule a testing appointment. The NABP's announcement of updates to the 2016 NAPLEX exam include increased fee price, number of exam questions, and time to sit for the exam. Number of exam questions increased from 185 to 225, and time to sit for the exam has increased from 4 hours and 15 minutes to 6 hours total. Of the 225 questions, only 200 are used to tabulate the applicant's score. The remaining questions are "trial balloon" questions under consideration for inclusion on future NAPLEX tests. There is no way to distinguish a regular test question from a trial balloon question. As of March 2024, the NAPLEX exam fee increased from $475 to $520.

Prior to the changes in November 2016, the NAPLEX exam was presented as a computer adaptive exam in which the delivery of questions was modified based on the response of the test taker and questions on a specific subject may have increased or decreased in difficulty as the test progressed. The new exam is a pre-assembled linear format (standardized delivery for all test-takers) and will no longer adjust the exam based on user responses.

There are several question types on the NAPLEX: multiple choice, select all that apply, point and click (to select a place on a picture or graph for the purpose of mechanisms of action, site of action, application or injection site, etc.), and sequencing. Essay and short answer are not included and, though previously used, K-type questions have been eliminated.

== Results ==
Exam results are typically reported seven business days after administration. Applicants may access their scores on the website of the state Board of Pharmacy. A tabulated or "scaled" score of 75 or higher (out of a possible 150) is required for passing. Reported scores are not percentage values, nor are they some configuration of right versus wrong. Rather, they represent a mathematically calculated "ability measure" of the applicant based on an algorithm developed by the National Associations of Boards of Pharmacy (NABP).

Applicants not obtaining a score of 75 or higher are given a performance profile, which details their relative areas of strength and weakness. They must wait at least 45 days (previously 91 days) before retaking the NAPLEX.
