= Canadian International Pharmacy Association =

Canadian association of licensed pharmacy businesses

Established in 2002, the Canadian International Pharmacy Association (CIPA) is a Canadian association of licensed pharmacy businesses offering mail order pharmacy services to Canadian and international patients. CIPA members sell pharmaceuticals and maintenance medications to individuals upon receipt of a valid prescription. In addition to selling Health Canada approved medications from their licensed Canadian pharmacies, CIPA members also have relationships with regulated international pharmacies and inspected fulfillment centres that directly deliver medications to patients. Patients make the choice from where their medications will be delivered, and this is confirmed with them at time of purchase.

In 2012, an international wholesale business owned by CanadaDrugs was involved in an incident in which some substandard drugs were inadvertently obtained in the United States. That same year, CanadaDrugs ceased the operation of its wholesale business, which was directed to healthcare clinics in the U.S. - not individuals. The matter has since been closed. The situation was unrelated to personal importation and therefore outside of CIPA’s purview of retail sales of daily maintenance medications directly to consumers. However, when CanadaDrugs completely stopped selling into the U.S., they no longer met CIPA’s membership criteria, and were therefore removed as a CIPA member.

According to Managed Care, an industry magazine, about a million Americans a year get drugs from licensed Canadian pharmacies that are certified by CIPA. Sen. John McCain (R-AZ), Sen. Bernie Sanders (I-VT), and five other sponsors have introduced legislation that would allow Americans with a U.S. prescription to order a 90-day supply of medicines from a licensed Canadian pharmacy.

CIPA has appeared frequently in the news as an advocate for safe online pharmacy practices and the lower prices of drugs available outside of the United States, though not without significant controversy. CIPA standards and practices have been described as "likely becoming a major part of the health care system in the near future". In 2009, CIPA was invited to present at the United Nations Internet Governance Forum on "Medicines on the Web - Risks and Benefits". Since 2017, CIPA has been an active collaborator with the University of Toronto, Dalla Lana School of Public Health and Munk School of Global Affairs and Public Policy; York University, Dahdaleh Institute of Global Health Research; RightsCon (2017 and 2018) and the United Nations Internet Governance Forums (2019 and 2020) toward establishing international, multi-stakeholder developed Principles, Standards, and Norms for the sale of medicines over the Internet. In his paper Digital Governance of Public Health: Toward a Regulatory Framework for Internet Pharmacies, Dr. Aria Ilyad Ahmad’s argues that “Voluntary self-regulation approaches also play an important role for mediating trust between consumers and Internet Pharmacies.
