= Formulary (pharmacy) =

List of medicines

A formulary is a list of pharmaceutical drugs, often decided upon by a group of people, for various reasons such as insurance coverage or use at a medical facility. Traditionally, a formulary contained a collection of formulas for the compounding and testing of medication (a resource closer to what would be referred to as a pharmacopoeia today). Today, when most prescription drugs are fully prepared by their manufacturers, the main function of a prescription formulary is to specify particular medications that are approved to be prescribed at a particular hospital, in a particular health system, or under a particular health insurance policy. The development of prescription formularies is based on evaluations of efficacy, safety, and cost-effectiveness of drugs.

Depending on the individual formulary, it may also contain additional clinical information, such as side effects, contraindications, and doses.

By the turn of the millennium, 156 countries had national or provincial essential medicines lists and 135 countries had national treatment.

== Australia ==
In Australia, where there is a public health care system, medications are subsidised under the Pharmaceutical Benefits Scheme (PBS) and medications that are available under the PBS and the indications for which they can be obtained under said scheme can be found in at least two places, the PBS webpage and the Australian Medicines Handbook.

== Canada ==
The Prescription Drug List is the national formulary that lists all medical ingredients for human and animal use available with a prescription with the exception of those under the Controlled Drugs and Substances Act. The Canadian Agency for Drugs and Technologies in Health (CADTH) is the advisory body that evaluates new medical technologies and prescription medication. Based on recommendations the provincial and territorial governments decide whether or not to implement changes to their healthcare system and public drug formularies. Provincial and territorial government provide partial prescription drug coverage and the overall drug payment is a mix of public taxation, private insurance and out-of-pocket expenses. Insurance coverage differs regionally, although each public drug coverage plan must meet standards set by the federal government. Regional health authorities are in charge of regulating and providing its residents insurance while the federal government provides insurance for specifically eligible veterans, First Nations, Inuit, Canadian Forces, federal inmates and some refugees.

== India ==
The National Formulary of India (NFI) published by Indian Pharmacopoeia Commission (IPC) is meant for the guidance of members of the medical and pharmaceutical profession; medical students, nurses and pharmacists etc. working in hospitals, dispensaries and in sales establishments. In the preparation of this formulary, the expert opinion of medical practitioners, teachers in medicine, nurses, pharmacists etc. has been obtained. The selection of drugs for inclusion in the National Formulary has been made taking into consideration the relative advantages and disadvantages of the various drugs used in current medical practice and their availability in the country. Thus, the National Formulary of India represents a broad consensus of expert opinion in respect of drugs and their formulations and provides the physicians with carefully selected therapeutic agents of proved effectiveness which form the basis of rational drug therapy.

The Ministry of Health and Family Welfare on 8 May 2008 assigned the mandatory responsibility to the Indian Pharmacopoeia Commission, Ghaziabad to publish NFI on a regular basis. The First Edition of NFI was published in 1960. The IPC has published three consecutive editions of National Formulary of India since its formation. The Indian Pharmacopoeia Commission has published the 4th edition, 5th edition and 6th edition of NFI. The 7th Edition of National Formulary of India (NFI-2026) is expected to release by early 2026 along with its digital version.

== United States ==
In the US, where a system of quasi-private healthcare is in place, a formulary is a list of prescription drugs available to enrollees, and a tiered formulary provides financial incentives for patients to select lower-cost drugs. For example, under a 3-tier formulary, the first tier typically includes generic drugs with the lowest cost sharing (e.g., 10% coinsurance), the second includes preferred brand-name drugs with higher cost sharing (e.g., 25%), and the third includes non-preferred brand-name drugs with the highest cost-sharing (e.g., 40%).

When used appropriately, formularies can help manage drug costs imposed on the insurance policy. However, for drugs that are not on formulary, patients must pay a larger percentage of the cost of the drug, sometimes 100%. Formularies vary between drug plans and differ in the breadth of drugs covered and costs of co-pay and premiums. Most formularies cover at least one drug in each drug class, and encourage generic substitution (also known as a preferred drug list). Formularies have shown to cause issues in hospitals when patients are discharged when not aligned with outpatient drug insurance plans.

== United Kingdom ==
In the UK, the National Health Service (NHS) provides publicly funded universal health care, financed by national health insurance. Here, formularies exist to specify which drugs are available on the NHS. The two main reference sources providing this information are the British National Formulary (BNF) and the Drug Tariff. There is a section in the Drug Tariff, known unofficially as the "Blacklist", detailing medicines which are not to be prescribed under the NHS and must be paid for privately by the patient. Recommendations for additions to the NHS formulary are provided by the National Institute for Health and Care Excellence.

In addition to this, local NHS hospital trusts and Primary Care (General Practitioners) Clinical Commissioning Groups (CCGs), produce their own lists of medicines deemed preferable for prescribing within their locality or organisation; such lists are usually a subset of the more comprehensive BNF. These formularies are not absolutely binding, and physicians may prescribe a non-formulary medicine if they consider it necessary and justifiable. Often, these local formularies are shared between a Primary Care Organisation (PCO) and hospitals within that PCO's jurisdiction, in order to facilitate the procedure of transferring a patient from primary care to secondary care, thus causing fewer "interfacing" issues in the process.

As in the United States, the NHS actively encourages prescribing of generic drugs, in order to save more of the budget allocated to them by the Department of Health.

== National formulary ==
A national formulary contains a list of medicines that are approved for prescription throughout the country, indicating which products are interchangeable. It includes key information on the composition, description, selection, prescribing, dispensing and administration of medicines. Those drugs considered less suitable for prescribing are clearly identified.

Examples of national formularies are:

- Australian Pharmaceutical Formulary (APF)
- Österreichisches Arzneibuch (ÖAB), the Austrian national formulary
- British National Formulary (BNF) and British National Formulary for Children (BNFC)
- Farmacotherapeutisch Kompas (FK), the Dutch national formulary
- Formularium Nasional (Fornas), the Indonesian national formulary
- Hrvatska Farmakopeja, the Croatian national formulary
- National Formulary of India, India
- Japan National Health Insurance Drug Price List
- Pharmaceutical Schedule, New Zealand's publicly funded national formulary
- United States National Formulary, later bought out and merged with the United States Pharmacopeia (USP-NF)
- Farmaceutiska Specialiteter i Sverige (FASS), the Swedish national formulary. Usage of the database is free of charge and it has no promotional texts or advertising. FASS has been developed by the Swedish Association of the Pharmaceutical Industry (LIF) in close cooperation with Sweden's pharmaceutical industry, with additional assistance from the Medical Products Agency, the Pharmaceutical Benefits Board and the National Corporation of Pharmacies. Information on interactions is derived from a joint development between the Department of Pharmaceutical Biosciences at Uppsala University and the Swedish Association of the Pharmaceutical Industry (LIF).

== See also ==
- Pharmacopoeia – Standard reference work on pharmaceutial drugs and compound medicines
- Pharmaceutical policy – Branch of health policy
