= Neil Naismith =

Neil Wighton Naismith
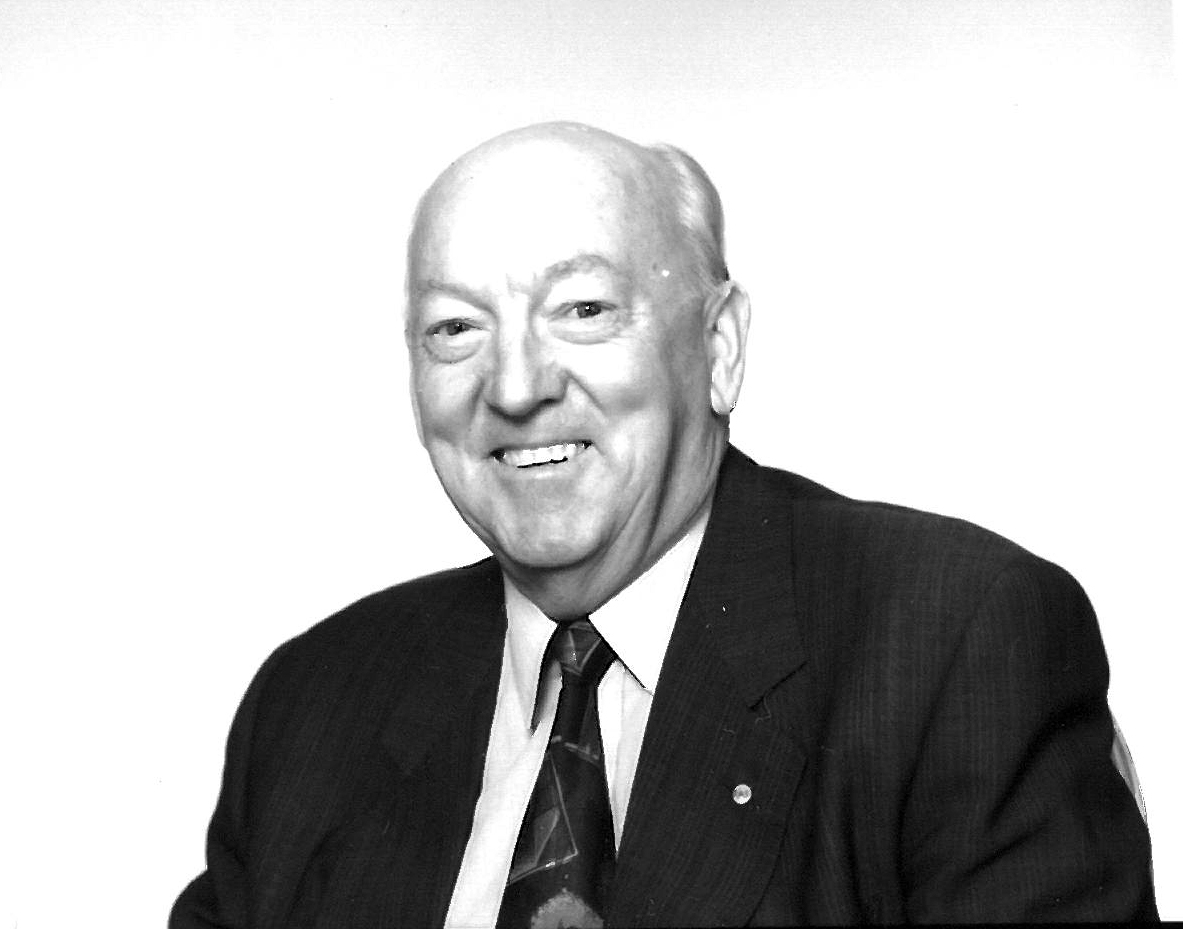
- Born: 13 November 1935
- Died: 26 May 2002 (aged 66)
- Occupation: Pharmacist
- Known for: Director of Pharmacy at the Royal Melbourne Hospital

Neil Wighton Naismith, PhC MPS FSHP AM (13 November 1935 – 26 May 2002), was an Australian pharmacist whose career in hospital pharmacy commenced in 1960. He served as Director of Pharmacy at The Royal Melbourne Hospital from 1967–1997.

Naismith introduced innovative changes to hospital pharmacy practice that provided a foundation for services that are now widely established. Neil Naismith implemented new drug distribution systems and presented a paper at the 1969 Federal Conference of the Society of Hospital Pharmacists of Australia (SHPA), entitled A New Look at Hospital Packaging, which provided a stimulus for changes to the methods of purchasing and packaging used by hospital pharmacies. Neil was awarded the Allen and Hanbury Medal of Merit in 1975 in recognition of his work in promoting the concepts of unit dose and unit dose packaging.

In 1972, Naismith's service to the advancement of pharmacy practice was also recognised by the Churchill Trust with the award of a Churchill Fellowship, and he was the first Australian hospital pharmacist to receive this award.

Naismith established the first formalised drug information service in Australia at the Royal Melbourne Hospital, and undertook cost-effectiveness studies to demonstrate the value of ward pharmacy services and the role of full-time ward pharmacists. Neil Naismith’s career included 40 years membership of SHPA where he served on the Federal Council (1967–1973 and 1993–2000) and on the Victorian Branch Committee for over 15 years. In 1965, in conjunction with Fred J Boyd, Neil launched the Australian Journal of Hospital Pharmacy, and from 1965–1971 was the inaugural administrator of the journal. He also co-authored The History of the Society of Hospital Pharmacists of Australia in Victoria published in 1991. Neil Naismith became a Fellow of the Society of Hospital Pharmacists of Australia through his thesis entitled Pharmaceutical Practice in Australian Hospitals, this being the first SHPA Fellowship awarded by thesis.

Naismith's commitment to quality use of medicines extended beyond hospital pharmacy. He served as both a State and National Councillor of the Pharmaceutical Society of Australia (PSA) and was National President of PSA from 1991-1993. He was a Director of the Australian Council on Healthcare Standards and of the Australian Pharmaceutical Publishing Company, and a Councillor of the Health Professions Council of Australia. He was also a Member of the Hospital and Charities Commission Pharmacy Advisory Committee, and served on the Pharmacy Board of Victoria from 1974-2002.

Naismith was a founding member of the Victorian Drug Usage Advisory Committee (established in 1986) and Chairman from 1986-May 2002. During this time he was also actively involved in driving the establishment and ongoing success of Therapeutic Guidelines Limited (TGL). He was a founding member of TGL's Board of Directors in 1996, remaining on the Board until 2002.

Through his role as Director of Pharmacy at The Royal Melbourne Hospital, he was involved with the booklet, Antibiotic Guidelines, published in 1978. These guidelines are now in the 14th edition.

Naismith was the 1982 recipient of the SHPA Fred J Boyd Award. He was awarded Member of the Order of Australia (AM) in 1991 for his services to the pharmacy profession, and the Merck Sharp and Dohme (Australia) Medal for Pharmacy Practice in 1993. The Neil Naismith Commemorative Lecture is presented annually to launch the Pharmaceutical Society of Australia Victorian Branch Continuing Professional Development program. It is dedicated to honour Naismith's contribution to the pharmacy profession.

== Bibliography ==
- Püschel, W; Rosenkranz, M; Geiler, G; Caffier, B; Stiehl, P; Richter, V (1976). "[The effect of D-penicillamine on experimental allergic arthritis in rabbits]". Z Rheumatol. 35 (5–6): 201–9. PMID 60013.
- Naismith, Neil. Cost recovery in hospital pharmacy. Paper presented at the Society of Hospital Pharmacists of Australia. Conference (19th: 1989: Canberra) Aust J Hosp Pharm. 1990; 20(1): 94-97 (ISSN 0310-6810)
- Peterson, Gregory M. Freezer, Isobel E. Naismith, Neil W. A survey of pharmacy practice in Australian private hospitals. Aust J Hosp Pharm. 1990 Oct; 20(5):363-366 (ISSN 0310-6810)
