= Gordon E. Appelbe =

British legal counselor (1931–2013)

Gordon E. Appelbe FRPharmS FCPP HonMPS
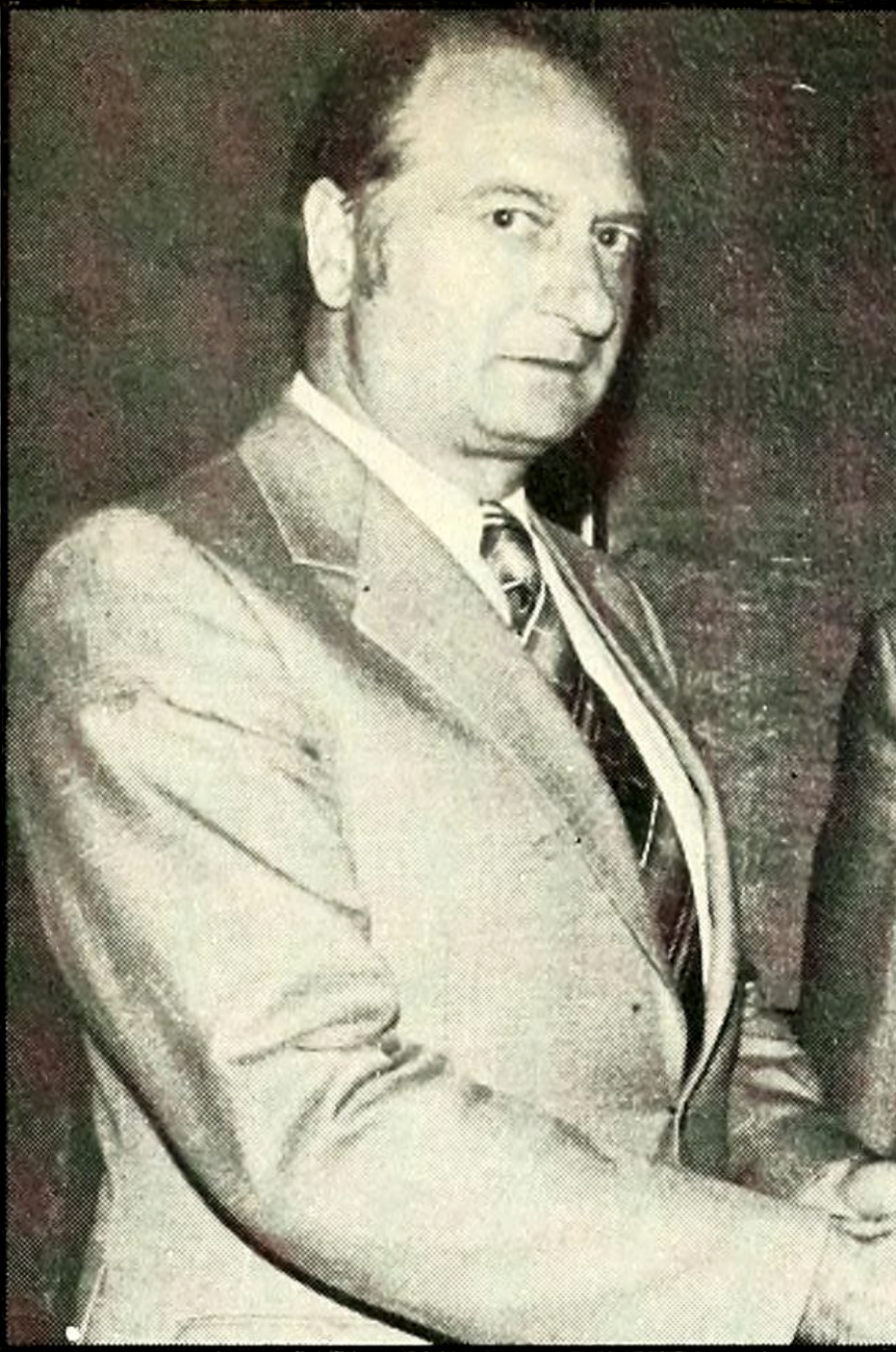
- Appelbe in Northern Ireland, 1979
- Born: Gordon Edward Appelbe; 27 January 1931
- Died: 29 September 2013 (aged 82)
- Occupation: Pharmaceutical lawyer

Academic background
- Education: University of London; University of Bath; University of Manchester
- Alma mater: University of Wales
- Thesis: The Control of Discipline in the Pharmaceutical Profession (1991)

Gordon Edward Appelbe (27 January 1931 – 29 September 2013) was a British pharmaceutical lawyer and corporate director specialising in pharmaceutical law and ethics.

== Education ==
Appelbe enrolled at the University of London on a Bachelor of Science (BSc) course in economics, but switched to a law degree, receiving his Bachelor of Laws (LLB) in 1970. He obtained a Master of Science (MSc) from the University of Bath in 1981 and a Doctor of Philosophy (PhD) from the University of Wales in 1991. His PhD thesis The Control of Discipline in the Pharmaceutical Profession was written in 1991 and published as a book in 1992.

== Career ==
Appelbe qualified as a pharmacist in 1956. He joined the staff of the Royal Pharmaceutical Society of Great Britain in 1965, first as an inspector, and in 1971 as secretary to the Statutory Committee. With an interest in Europe and regarded by many as being outspoken about the Society's role on the continent, Appelbe was appointed secretary of the Society's European Committee a few months later. From 1972 to 1985, he lobbied in Brussels for mutual recognition of pharmaceutical qualifications between the United Kingdom and European Union. He was ultimately successful.

In 1974, Appelbe was appointed deputy head of the Pharmaceutical Society's Law Department, retaining the role of secretary of the European Committee and taking on the role of secretary of the Ethics Committee. He was designated a fellow of the Society (with the postnominals FRPharmS) in 1978 and appointed head of the Law Department and Chief Inspector in 1978, both of which roles he held until 1991. In 1983, Appelbe lead the writing of a new code of conduct for the pharmaceutical profession in Britain, called a "complete rewrite" by The Chemist and Druggist. On the topic of counterfeit medicines, he warned pharmacists in a 1990 statement not to allow any commercial interests to influence their professional judgment.

In 1991, Appelbe was elected to the Royal Pharmaceutical Society Council after three months' absence from the headship of the Society's Law Department. He was later appointed treasurer of the Society and authored several editions of Pharmacy Law and Ethics and Dale & Appelbe with Pharmaceutical Press between 1976 and 2013.

After leaving the Royal Pharmaceutical Society, Appelbe worked as a pharmaceutical and legal consultant for independent clients. He was a fellow of the College of Physicians of Philadelphia (FCPP) and an honorary member of the Pharmaceutical Society of Australia (HonMPS).

== Personal life ==
Appelbe was awarded a degree in operatic studies by the University of Manchester in 2005.

== Bibliography ==
=== Books ===
- Appelbe, Gordon E.; Dale, Joseph R. (1979). Pharmacy Law and Ethics. London]: Pharmaceutical Press. ISBN 0853691282 – via Internet Archive.
- Appelbe, Gordon E.; Dale, Joseph R. (1989). Dale and Appelbe's Pharmacy Law and Ethics. Pharmaceutical Press. ISBN 9780853692119.
- Appelbe, Gordon E. (1992). The Control of Discipline in the Pharmaceutical Profession – via Google Books.
- Appelbe, Gordon E.; Dale, Joseph R.; Wingfield, John (1993). Dale and Applebe's Pharmacy, Law and Ethics. ISBN 9780853692850.
- Appelbe, Gordon E.; Wingfield, Joy (1997). Dale and Appelbe's Pharmacy Law and Ethics. London: Pharmaceutical Press. ISBN 085369379X – via Internet Archive.
- Appelbe, Gordon E.; Taylor, Lindsay M.; Wingfield, Joy (1997). Practical Exercises in Pharmacy Law and Ethics. Pharmaceutical Press. ISBN 9780853693857.
- Appelbe, Gordon E. (2001). Dale and Appelbe's Pharmacy Law and Ethics. London: Pharmaceutical Press. ISBN 9780853694755 – via Internet Archive.
- Appelbe, Gordon E. (2002). Practical Exercises in Pharmacy Law and Ethics. London]: Pharmaceutical Press. ISBN 9780853695226 – via Internet Archive.
- Appelbe, Gordon E.; Wingfield, Joy (2005). Dale and Appelbe's Pharmacy Law and Ethics. London: Pharmaceutical Press. ISBN 9780853696049 – via Internet Archive.
- Appelbe, Gordon E.; Wingfield, Joy (2009). Dale and Appelbe's Pharmacy Law and Ethics. London: Pharmaceutical Press. ISBN 9780853698272 – via Internet Archive.
- Appelbe, Gordon E.; Wingfield, Joy (2013). Dale and Appelbe's Pharmacy and Medicines Law. London: Pharmaceutical Press. ISBN 9780853699897 – via Internet Archive.

=== Articles ===
- Appelbe, Gordon E. (2000). "Human Rights and Pharmacy". The Chemist and Druggist. 254 (6254). London: Morgan Brothers: 32–33 – via Internet Archive.
- Appelbe, Gordon E. (2005). Legal Aspects of Pharmacy Business. London: Pharmaceutical Press. p. 104. ISBN 0853695636.
- Appelbe, Gordon E. (2005). "From Arsenic to Thalidomide: A Brief History of Medicine Safety". Making Medicines. Pharmaceutical Press. ISBN 0857110993 – via Internet Archive.
