= Fred Boyd =

Fred Boyd may refer to:

- Fred Boyd (basketball) (1950–2023), American basketball player
- Fred Boyd (baseball) (1898–1923), American Negro leagues baseball player
- Fred J. Boyd, Australian pharmacist

== See also ==
- Frederick Boyd (disambiguation)
