= Pregnancy category =

Risk of fetal injury due to the use of a pharmaceutical

The pregnancy category is an assessment of the risk of fetal injury due to a medication, if it is used as directed by the mother during pregnancy. It does not include any risks conferred by medicines or their metabolites in breast milk.

Every medication has information listed in its product literature. The British National Formulary used to provide a table of drugs to be avoided or used with caution in pregnancy, and did so using a limited number of key phrases, but now Appendix 4 (which was the Pregnancy table) has been removed. Appendix 4 is now titled "Intravenous Additives". However, information that was previously available in the former Appendix 4 (pregnancy) and Appendix 5 (breastfeeding) is now available in the individual drug monographs.

== United States ==
American law requires that certain drugs and biological products must be labelled very specifically. Title 21, Part 201.57 (9)(i) of the Code of Federal Regulations lists specific requirements regarding the labeling of drugs with respect to their effects on pregnant populations, including a definition of a "pregnancy category". These rules are enforced by the Food and Drug Administration.

To supplement this information, the FDA publishes additional rules regarding pregnancy and lactation labeling.

The FDA does not regulate labeling for all hazardous and non-hazardous substances. Many substances, including alcohol, are widely known to cause serious hazards to pregnant women and their fetuses, including fetal alcohol syndrome. Many other pollutants and hazardous materials are similarly known to cause reproductive harm. However, some of these substances are not subject to drug labeling laws, and are therefore not assigned a "Pregnancy Category" per 21 CFR 201.57.

Pregnancy Category	Description
A	No risk in controlled human studies: Adequate and well-controlled human studies have failed to demonstrate a risk to the fetus in the first trimester of pregnancy (and there is no evidence of risk in later trimesters).
B	No risk in other studies: Animal reproduction studies have failed to demonstrate a risk to the fetus and there are no adequate and well-controlled studies in pregnant women, or animal studies have shown adverse effects, but adequate and well-controlled studies in pregnant women have failed to demonstrate a risk to the fetus in any trimester.
C	Risk not ruled out: Animal reproduction studies have shown an adverse effect on the fetus and there are no adequate and well-controlled studies in humans, but potential benefits may warrant use of the drug in pregnant women despite potential risks.
D	Positive evidence of risk: There is positive evidence of human fetal risk based on adverse reaction data from investigational or marketing experience or studies in humans, but potential benefits may warrant use of the drug in pregnant women despite potential risks.
X	Contraindicated in pregnancy: Studies in animals or humans have demonstrated fetal abnormalities and/or there is positive evidence of human fetal risk based on adverse reaction data from investigational or marketing experience, and the risks involved in use of the drug in pregnant women clearly outweigh potential benefits.
N	The FDA has not yet classified the drug into a specified pregnancy category.

One characteristic of the FDA definitions of the pregnancy categories is that the FDA requires a relatively large amount of high-quality data on a pharmaceutical for it to be defined as Pregnancy Category A. As a result of this, many drugs that would be labelled as safe in other countries are allocated to Category C by the FDA.

=== Pregnancy and Lactation Labeling Rule of December 2014 ===
On December 13, 2014, the FDA published the Pregnancy and Lactation Labeling Final Rule (PLLR), which changed the labeling requirements for the pregnancy and lactation sections for prescription drugs and biological agents. The final rule removed the pregnancy letter categories, and created descriptive subsections for pregnancy exposure and risk, lactation, and effects to reproductive potential for females and males. Labeling changes from this rule began on June 30, 2015, with all submissions for prescription drugs and biological agents using the labeling changes immediately. Previously approved drugs from June 30, 2001, will switch to the new labeling gradually. The rule does not affect the labeling of over-the-counter drugs or of drugs approved prior to June 30, 2001.

== Australia ==
Australia has a slightly different pregnancy category system from the United States. The categorisation of medicines for use in pregnancy does not follow a hierarchical structure.

- Notably the subdivision of Category B. (For drugs in B1, B2 and B3 categories, human data are lacking or inadequate and subcategorisation is actually based on animal data instead)
- The allocation of a B category does not imply greater safety than C category
- Medicines in category D are not absolutely contraindicated during pregnancy (e.g. anticonvulsants)

The system, as outlined below, was developed by medical and scientific experts based on available evidence of risks associated with taking particular medicines while pregnant. Being general in nature, it is not presented as medical advice to health professionals or the public.

Some prescribing guides, such as the Australian Medicines Handbook, are shifting away from using pregnancy categories since, inherent in these categories, there is an implied assumption that the alphabetical code is one of safety when this is not always the case. Categorisation does not indicate which stages of fetal development might be affected and does not convey information about the balance between risks and benefits in a particular situation. Additionally, categories are not necessarily maintained or updated with availability of new data.

Pregnancy Category	Australian categorisation system for prescribing medicines in pregnancy
A	Drugs which have been taken by many pregnant women and women of childbearing age without an increase in the frequency of malformations or other direct or indirect harmful effects on the fetus having been observed.
B1	Drugs which have been taken by only a limited number of pregnant women and women of childbearing age, without an increase in the frequency of malformation or other direct or indirect harmful effects on the human fetus having been observed. Studies in animals have not shown evidence of an increased occurrence of fetal damage.
B2	Drugs which have been taken by only a limited number of pregnant women and women of childbearing age, without an increase in the frequency of malformation or other direct or indirect harmful effects on the human fetus having been observed. Studies in animals are inadequate or may be lacking, but available data show no evidence of an increased occurrence of fetal damage.
B3	Drugs which have been taken by only a limited number of pregnant women and women of childbearing age, without an increase in the frequency of malformation or other direct or indirect harmful effects on the human fetus having been observed. Studies in animals have shown evidence of an increased occurrence of fetal damage, the significance of which is considered uncertain in humans.
C	Drugs which, owing to their pharmaceutical effects, have caused or may be suspected of causing, harmful effects on the human fetus or neonate without causing malformations. These effects may be reversible.
D	Drugs which have caused, are suspected to have caused or may be expected to cause, an increased incidence of human fetal malformations or irreversible damage. These drugs may also have adverse pharmacological effects.
X	Drugs which have such a high risk of causing permanent damage to the fetus that they should not be used in pregnancy or when there is a possibility of pregnancy.

== Germany ==
Category	Group	Description
	Group 1	Extensive human tests and animal studies have not shown the drug to be embryotoxic/teratogenic
	Group 2	Extensive human tests of the drug have not shown the drug to be embryotoxic.
	Group 3	Extensive human tests of the drug have not shown the drug to be embryotoxic. However, the drug appears to be embryotoxic/teratogenic in animals.
	Group 4	No adequate and well-controlled studies of the drug's effects on humans are available. Animal studies have shown no embryotoxic/teratogenic effects.
	Group 5	No adequate and well-controlled studies of the drug's effects on humans are available.
	Group 6	No adequate and well-controlled studies of the drug's effects on humans are available. Animal studies have shown embryotoxic/teratogenic effects.
	Group 7	There is a risk that the drug is embryotoxic/teratogenic in humans, at least in the first trimester.
	Group 8	There is a risk that the drug is toxic to fetuses throughout the second and third trimesters.
	Group 9	There is a risk that the drug causes prenatal complications or abnormalities.
	Group 10	There is a risk that the drug causes hormone specific action on the human fetus.
	Group 11	There is a known risk that the drug is a mutagen/carcinogen.

== Categorization of selected agents ==
The data presented is for comparative and illustrative purposes only, and may have been superseded by updated data.

Classification of some agents, based on different national bodies
Pharmaceutical agent	Australia	United States
Acetylsalicylic acid (aspirin)	C	D third trimester
Alcohol	X	X
Amoxicillin	A	A
Caffeine	A	?
Amoxicillin with clavulanic acid	B1	B
Cefotaxime	B1	B
Diclofenac	C	D third trimester
Isotretinoin	X	X
Leflunomide	X	X
Loperamide	B3	C
Nicotine	D	?
Paracetamol (acetaminophen)	A	C
Paroxetine	D	D
Phenytoin	D	D
Rifampicin	C	C
Thalidomide	X	X
Theophylline	A	C
Temazepam	C	X
Tetracycline	D	D
Triamcinolone (skin)	A	C

=== Withdrawn drugs ===
Prostaglandin E_{2}	C	?
Etretinate	X	X
