= BNFC =

BNFC may refer to:

- British National Formulary for Children, or BNF for Children, the standard UK paediatric reference for prescribing and pharmacology
- Bulgarian National Film Center, the national funding and advocacy body for the film industry in Bulgaria
