= Frederick Boyd =

Frederick Boyd may refer to:

- Allen Boyd (Frederick Allen Boyd Jr., born 1945), American politician
- Frederick Boyd (priest), Archdeacon of Winnipeg
- Sir Frederick Boyd (1820–1889), 6th Baronet of the Boyd baronets

== See also ==
- Fred Boyd (disambiguation)
- Mark Frederick Boyd (1889–1968), American bacteriologist
- Boyd (surname)
