= Jeffs =

Jeffs is a surname that may refer to:

- A.S. Jeffs (1871–1905), American football coach
- Brent W. Jeffs, American author, advocate and member of the Fundamentalist Church of Jesus Christ of Latter-Day Saints
- Charles Jeffs (1895–1974), British World War I flying ace
- Christine Jeffs (born 1963), New Zealand director, editor and screenwriter
- A. Dean Jeffs (1928–2018), American politician
- Heleman Jeffs (born 1993), American high ranking member of the Fundamentalist Church of Jesus Christ of Latter-Day Saints
- Ian Jeffs (born 1982), English footballer
- Lance Jeffs, Australian pharmacist
- Lyle Jeffs, American bishop in the Fundamentalist Church of Jesus Christ of Latter-Day Saints
- Nephi Jeffs, American member of the Fundamentalist Church of Jesus Christ of Latter-Day Saints
- Rachel Jeffs, American former member of the Fundamentalist Church of Jesus Christ of Latter-Day Saints
- Rulon Jeffs (1909–2002), American former President of the Fundamentalist Church of Jesus Christ of Latter-Day Saints
- Seth Jeffs, American official in the Fundamentalist Church of Jesus Christ of Latter-Day Saints
- Tim Jeffs (born 1965), American musician
- Toni Jeffs (born 1968), New Zealand freestyle swimmer
- Warren Jeffs (born 1955), American convicted sex offender and former President of the Fundamentalist Church of Jesus Christ of Latter-Day Saints
