= Journal of Pharmacy Practice and Research =

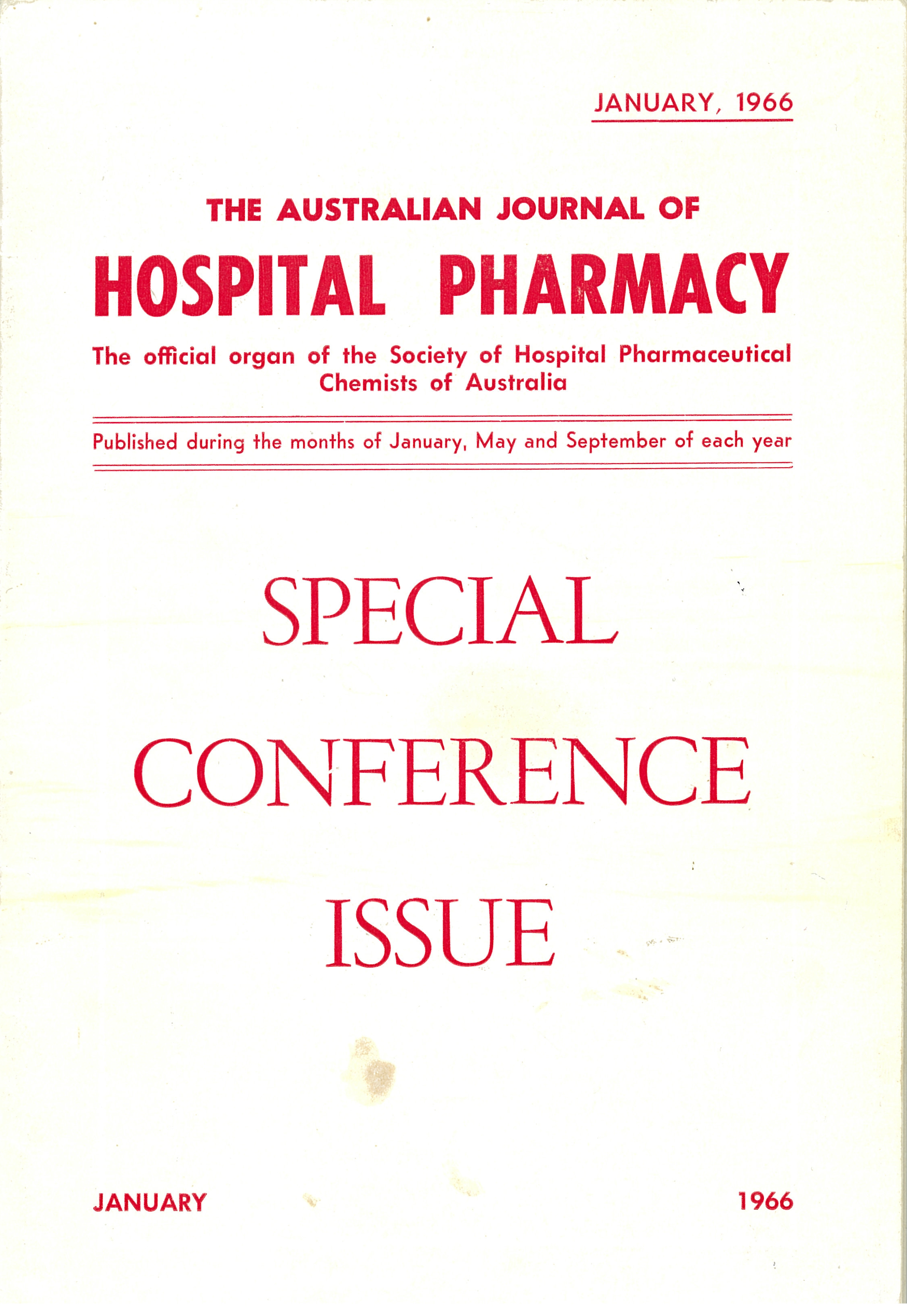
- Discipline: Pharmaceutics
- Language: English
- Edited by: Professor Michael Dooley

Publication details
- Former name(s): The Australian Journal of Hospital Pharmacy
- History: 1966-present
- Publisher: John Wiley & Sons on behalf of The Society of Hospital Pharmacists of Australia (Australia)
- Frequency: Quarterly

Standard abbreviations
- ISO 4: J. Pharm. Pract. Res.

Indexing
- ISSN: 1445-937X (print); 2055-2335 (web)
- OCLC no.: 896129471

Links
- Journal homepage; Online access; Online archive; Journal page on society website

The Journal of Pharmacy Practice and Research is a quarterly peer-reviewed scientific journal published by John Wiley & Sons on behalf of The Society of Hospital Pharmacists of Australia (SHPA). The journal covers the field of pharmacy and includes "focus sections" on geriatric therapeutics and primary care. As the official publication of SHPA, the journal also publishes editorial discussion relating to pharmacy practice, book reviews, and recurring review sections focusing on medication safety and recent research in clinical pharmacy from around the world. The editor-in-chief is Chris Alderman (University of South Australia).

== History ==
The journal was established in 1966 as the Australian Journal of Hospital Pharmacy with Fred J. Boyd and Charles B Macgibbon as the founding editors-in-chief. The journal obtained its current title in 2002. Since 2014, the journal is published by John Wiley & Sons on behalf of the SHPA.

== Abstracting and indexing ==
The journal is abstracted and indexed in Biological Abstracts, BIOSIS Previews, CINAHL, EBSCO databases, Embase, and Scopus.
