= Carl Warburg =

German physician (c. 1805–1892)

- Born: Mainz, Holy Roman Empire, c. 1805
- Died: Shepherd’s Bush, London, August 1892 (age 87)
- Known for: Warburg's Tincture
- Scientific career
- Fields: Medicine

Carl Warburg (c. 1805–1892), also known as Charles Warburg, was a physician and scientist. He was the inventor of 'Warburg's Tincture', a medicine well known in the 19th century for treating fevers, including malaria.

== Early life and education ==
Carl Warburg was born circa 1805 in Mainz (AKA Mayence) in part of what is now Germany. (Note: He has been erroneously described by some writers as being born in Austria.) When he was about 10, the area he lived in became part of the Grand Duchy of Hesse. He has been reputed by some to have been Jewish, but this is now questionable because he was baptised, married in a church, and his children were also baptised. A doctor of medicine, it appears that he qualified at the University of Heidelberg.

== Professional career ==
Carl Warburg was a physician with a keen interest in botany. His life and career were dominated by Warburg's Tincture - a pharmaceutical fever medicine which he invented in 1834 in British Guiana (now Guyana), and which he manufactured, promoted and sold for several decades.

=== Warburg's Tincture ===
Warburg's Tincture was a well-known antipyretic in the 19th century. It was principally employed in the treatment of tropical fevers, such as malaria and yellow fever, and was considered by many as being superior to quinine. Carl Warburg manufactured and marketed Warburg's Tincture for several decades. In order to spread the reputation of the drug, he supplied copious quantities to medical professionals and hospitals at great personal expense. In 1846 Warburg's Tincture was extensively trialled in Austria and the following year it was adopted as an official medicine by the Austrian Empire by imperial order. Warburg's Tincture was sold as a secret, proprietary remedy for over forty years. As a result, both Carl Warburg and his eponymous drug were distrusted by many in the medical profession, particularly in England. Warburg wanted the British Government to procure the formula of Warburg's Tincture from him, but such an arrangement never came to fruition. Writing in 1870, Carl Warburg lamented that his medicine was still "comparatively unknown". He decided to disclose the formula in 1875. Warburg's Tincture subsequently appeared in the first edition of Martindale: The Extra Pharmacopoeia in 1883, and continued to be included until the 1928 edition.

=== Friends in high places ===
In August 1850, Carl Warburg received an invitation to and attended an official audience with the court of Queen Victoria, at the royal residence Osborne House. This had been arranged by the Austrian Count Mensdorff, Emmanuel von Mensdorff-Pouilly, a mutual friend. Carl Warburg was received by Sir James Clark (royal physician to Queen Victoria and Prince Albert). Clark became an advocate of Warburg's Tincture. Carl Warburg was also friends with Prince Metternich, another Austrian politician and statesman, who was one of the most important diplomats of the era. In addition, Warburg had been received by Ferdinand I of Austria.

=== Laboratory near Sutton, Surrey in 1850s ===
During the 1850s and possibly 1860s, Carl Warburg utilised and owned purpose-built laboratory premises near modern-day Belmont, Sutton, in Downs Road. This was established in the late 1990s, by a local historian who also identified the exact location. This laboratory was situated in the vicinity of where the Sutton branch of the Royal Marsden Hospital now stands. The approximate location is shown on this map: . The reason for the laboratory being located here was related to secrecy considerations: in the mid 19th-century this area of the present London Borough of Sutton near Banstead Downs was very remote and lowly populated. This laboratory building was demolished in 1881.

=== Publications ===
Pamphlets and booklets

- 1839, London. Specific for fever, now first introduced into Europe (8 pp.)
- 1846, Vienna. Pharmakologische Notizen über die Wirkung und den Gebrauch der Dr. Warburg'schen vegetabilischen Fiebertinctur (title translates as 'Notes on the pharmacological effect and the use of Dr Warburg's vegetable fever tincture') (c. 24 pp).
- 1870, London, Warburg Tincture: statement proving by numerous official documents its remarkable curative powers in fevers... (c. 60 pp.)

== Countries of residence ==
Carl Warburg was born and educated in Germany. In the 1830s Warburg lived in British Guiana (Guyana) (South America), travelling there due to "personal circumstances", where he worked as a physician and developed his Warburg's Tincture. When he introduced his tincture into Europe, in 1839, he moved to London, England. In the mid-late 1840s, Warburg lived in Vienna, Austria, where his tincture was being trialled. He left Vienna following the 1848 revolution, moving to London where he resided until his death in 1892. He lived at numerous addresses in London. Carl Warburg obtained British naturalisation in 1852.

== Later life ==
Carl Warburg lived in poverty in his old age. Writing in 1870 – then aged in his 60s – he stated that he was a "poor man", "impoverished" due to the cost of having produced and donated, over the course of several decades, a total of in excess of 80,000 bottles of his tincture to physicians and hospitals for medical trials, which had a commercial value of many thousands of pounds. In 1878, three years after disclosing the formula of Warburg's Tincture, he was described as living in "deplorable circumstances" and "in need of the commonest necessaries of life". In 1882 the British Government gave Warburg £200 in recognition of his work. In 1890, aged 86, Carl Warburg was described as living in "great poverty" with two widowed daughters with children to support; a subscription fund was set up for his benefit.

== Marriage and children ==
Carl Warburg married his first wife, Helena, in c. 1827. They separated in c. 1848. His second wife was Emma with whom he cohabited until they married in c. 1877. He had a daughter (bn. c. 1828) via Helena, and at least eight children via Emma, namely: Margaus (bn. c. 1853), Hermann (bn. 1855), Fritz [aka Frederick] (bn. c. 1858), Carl [aka Charles] (bn. c. 1859), Emma (bn. c. 1861), Florence (bn. c. 1865), Charlotte (bn. c. 1866), and Mectildis (bn. c. 1867).
