= Warburg's tincture =

Pharmaceutical drug invented in 1834

Warburg's tincture was a pharmaceutical drug, now obsolete. It was invented in 1834 by Dr. Carl Warburg.

Warburg's tincture was well known in the Victorian era as a medicine for fevers, especially tropical fevers, including malaria. It was considered, by some, to be superior to quinine.

Warburg's Tincture was a secret, proprietary remedy. The formula was not published until 1875. Later, it was included in the first edition of Martindale: The Extra Pharmacopoeia. Warburg's Tincture included an array of ingredients, including quinine.

== Synonyms ==
List of alternative names by which Warburg's Tincture was known or referred to:

- 'Warburg Tincture'
- 'The Warburg Tincture'
- 'Warburg's Fever Tincture'
- 'Warburg's Fever Tincture and Tonic Medicine'
- 'Warburg Fever Tincture and Tonic Medicine'
- 'Warburg's Vegetable Fever Tincture'
- 'Dr Warburg's Vegetable Fever Drops'
- 'Warburg's Vegetable Fever Drops'
- 'Dr Warburg's Tincture'
- 'Dr Warburg's Fever Tincture'
- 'Warburg Drops'
- 'Warburg's Drops'
- 'Warburg's Fever Drops'
- 'Dr Warburg's Fever Drops'
- 'Dr Warburg's Drops'
- 'Tinctura Warburgi'
- 'Tinctura Warburgii'
- 'Tinctura antifebrilis Warburgi'
- 'Tinctura antifebrilis Warburgii'
- 'Tinctura Antiperiodica'
- 'Antiperiodica Tincture'
- 'Warburg' (informal)

== Appearance and format ==
As its name implies, Warburg's Tincture was originally available only in liquid form. It was deep brown to golden yellow in colour; its taste was bitter and not very palatable. It was sold in small bottles of unique design, containing about one ounce. The label affixed to each bottle bore the registered trademark, which depicted an image of the bottle accompanied by a facsimile of Carl Warburg's signature. By 1888 the drug was available in tablet form.

== History ==
Warburg's Tincture was invented by Dr Carl Warburg in 1834, in British Guiana (now Guyana). It was introduced into Europe in 1839. Warburg's Tincture received medical trials in British Guiana in the 1830s, and then elsewhere around the world in the 1840s and 1850s. In 1846, Warburg's Tincture was extensively trialled in Austria and, the following year, it was adopted as an official medicine by the Austrian Empire, by imperial order.

Warburg's Tincture was sold as a secret, proprietary medicine for over forty years, and was marketed and manufactured by Carl Warburg for many decades. He wanted the British Government to procure the formula of Warburg's Tincture from him, but such an arrangement never came to fruition. Nevertheless, the British Government was a significant client, procuring Warburg's Tincture for military forces serving overseas in India and Ceylon (now Sri Lanka); in Africa, in Gold Coast (now Ghana), Gambia and Sierra Leone; in the West Indies; and in Cyprus, Corfu, Mauritius and China. In 1867, in the House of Commons of the United Kingdom, Sir Robert Anstruther, 5th Baronet asked the Secretary of War why Warburg's Tincture was not being supplied in larger quantities to troops in India.

Writing in 1870, Carl Warburg lamented that his eponymous drug was "comparatively unknown". The formula was disclosed by him in November 1875 when it was published on his behalf in The Lancet and The Medical Times. In 1855, it retailed at 6s/6d a bottle.

=== Famous users ===
Famous Victorians who are documented to have used Warburg's Tincture include:

- Captain Sir Richard Francis Burton - explorer and diplomat
- General Charles George Gordon of Khartoum - senior army officer and colonial administrator
- Dr David Livingstone - missionary and explorer
- Dante Gabriel Rossetti - Pre-Raphaelite artist.
- Frederic Shields - artist and illustrator.

== Medicinal uses ==
=== Medicinal claims ===
Warburg's Tincture was promoted by its inventor, Dr Carl Warburg, as a medicine suitable for treating all types of fevers, but especially tropical fevers, including malaria and yellow fever; and that it could also be used as a tonic in debility and convalescence. He claimed that his eponymous tincture was superior to any other antipyretic, including quinine. "I assert that for perfect safety, for efficacy, rapidity of action, and for economy, my tincture has no rival, nor any approach to it". He also stated that quinine only "relieves", whereas Warburg's Tincture "cures". He advocated that Warburg's Tincture could be employed at all stages of fever, as well as a prophylactic.

" [Warburg’s Tincture] is an unfailing remedy in all cases of Intermittent, Continued, Continued-Remittment, Nervous and Typhus Fevers; Cholera, Diarrhoea, and Dysentery; Scrofula in all its forms; Incipient Consumption, Chronic Bronchitic Cough, Want of Appetite, Delirium Tremens, Morbid Digestion, arising from excess in the use of spirituous drinks, Scurvy and every disease of a scorbutic character. "

Official advertisement, 1855

=== 19th century ===
In the Victorian era Warburg's Tincture was principally employed in the treatment of tropical fevers, including malaria, yellow fever and typhus. It was therefore an antipyretic, and an antimalarial drug.

=== 20th century ===
Warburg's Tincture was vaunted as being superior to quinine in the treatment of malaria by many in the Victorian era. Quinine remained the first-line antimalarial drug of choice until the 1940s, when other drugs replaced it. Until recently Chloroquine was the most widely used antimalarial drug. Warburg's Tincture was included in Burroughs Wellcome & Company's tabloid medicine cases of the late 19th and early 20th centuries.

"There is now no exact equivalent of Warburg's Tincture ....The most similar modern preparation is ammoniated tincture of quinine. This omits aloes and rhubarb, whose function was a laxative to 'purge' the patient's system, an approach to fever treatment now redundant. Ammoniated tincture of quinine last appeared in the British Pharmaceutical Codex of 1963, but still remains an official preparation that could be prepared if necessary....it was popular as an over the counter medicine for colds until c. 1980, but is now rarely used."

== Reputation and efficacy ==
'Warburg's Tincture' was a well-known drug in the Victorian era. It earned itself a well regarded international reputation in certain quarters of the medical profession, many attesting to its efficacy and value.

One of the most notable and strongest advocates of Warburg's Tincture was Surgeon-General W. C. Maclean, C.B, (1811–1898), Professor of Military Medicine at the Army Medical School, at Chatham and later at the Royal Victoria Military Hospital, Netley, from 1860 until 1885. Maclean contributed the chapters on malarial fevers and dysentery in A System of Medicine, edited by Sir John Russell Reynolds (the latter being "an eminent and highly influential physician in the Victorian era who held the Presidencies of the Royal College of Physicians of London, and of the British Medical Association"). Maclean considered Warburg's Tincture to be the best drug for the treatment of malaria and, in his lectures and writings on tropical diseases, he strongly recommended its use.

" I have treated remittent fevers of every degree of severity contracted in the jungles of the Deccan and the Mysore, at the base of the mountain ranges in India, on the Coromandel Coast, in the pestilential highlands of the northern division of the Madras Presidency, on the malarial rivers of China, and in men brought to [Royal Victoria Military Hospital, Netley] from the swamps of the Gold Coast, and I affirm that I have never seen quinine, when given alone, act in the characteristic of this tincture....I have never seen a single dose of [quinine] given alone, to the extent of nine grains and half, suffice to arrest an exacerbation of remittent fever, much less prevent its recurrence, while nothing is more common than to see the same quantity of the alkaloid in Warburg’s tincture bring about both results. "

Surgeon-General W. C. Maclean, Professor of Military Medicine at the Army Medical School, Netley - The Lancet, 1875

In addition to Surgeon-General Maclean, Warburg's Tincture was highly praised by many other eminent medical professionals of the Victorian era, including:

- Sir James Johnson M.D. - physician extraordinary to King William IV.
- Sir James Clark M.D. - royal physician to Queen Victoria and Prince Albert.
- Sir William Henry Broadbent, 1st Baronet, M.D. - St Mary's Hospital, London and London Fever Hospital, Physician in Ordinary to Queen Victoria and King Edward VII. ("Warburg’s Tincture has long held a high reputation in India, as a remedy of undoubted and indeed unequalled power in the treatment of the malignant malarial fevers of that country and of cholera. Testimony to its efficacy has come from men whose capability and opportunities of forming an opinion could not be disputed", 1877)
- Dr Thomas Southwood Smith - London Fever Hospital, and recognised expert on the treatment of fevers.
- Dr Benjamin Guy Babington - Guy's Hospital ("I consider it the most potent anti-intermittent medicine I have ever employed", 1851).
- Dr F. C. Skey - St Bartholomew's Hospital, and Professor of Surgery to Royal College of Surgeons of England.
- Sir James Gibson, M.D., K.C.B. - Director-General, Army Medical Department, Whitehall, London.
- Sir Andrew Halliday, M.D. - Deputy Inspector General of Military Hospitals.
- Dr Macgrath - Director-General, Army Medical Department, Madras, India.
- Dr Joseph Johann Knolz - head of the civilian medical department of the Austrian Empire.
- Dr Rieken - Belgium, physician to Leopold I of Belgium.
- Count E Bylandt M.D. - physician to William II of the Netherlands
- Dr Salgues - Dijon, France.
- Dr Uyttrhoven - Brussels, Belgium.

=== Detractors, secret remedy ===
As a consequence of Warburg's Tincture being sold as a secret, proprietary remedy, many in the medical profession, particularly in England, derided, distrusted and dismissed it as a 'patent medicine' or 'quack medicine', and disliked it and criticised Carl Warburg on grounds of professional ethics.

== Status, entries in pharmacopoeia, formulary and other pharmaceutical compendia ==
- Warburg's Tincture was adopted by the Austrian empire as an official medicine in 1847; it was added to the Austrian 'Materia Medica' under the name 'Tinctura Warburgi'.
- Warburg's Tincture appeared in the first edition of Martindale: The Extra Pharmacopoeia (now known as Martindale: The complete drug reference) in 1883, and was included until the 19th edition of 1928.
- Warburg's Tincture was included in the National Formulary Section of The Dispensatory for the United States of America in the 20th edition in 1918, listed under the entry for 'Tinctura Antiperiodica'.
- The Pocket Formulary, and synopsis of the British & Foreign pharmacopoeias: comprising standard and approved formulae for the preparation and compounds employed in medical practice London, by Henry Beasley. Included in various editions, e.g. 1851 (fifth edition), 1856, 1877.
- Jahresbericht der Pharmazie, 1910, Munich, Germany.
- Warburg's Tincture is now obsolete as a medicinal drug. It last appeared in the Martindale: The Extra Pharmacopoeia in 1928.

== Properties / formula ==
The formula of Warburg's Tincture was disclosed by its inventor in November 1875 when it was published in The Lancet and The Medical Times on his behalf.

Ingredients and directions for preparation

The ingredient list calls for: 4 ounces each of Socotrine aloes, Rhubarb root (East India), Angelica seeds, and Confectio Damocratis (Damocrates' Confection); 2 ounces each of Helenis root (Elecampane root), Saffron, Fennel seeds, and Prepared chalk; and 1 ounce each of Gentian root, Zedoary root, Cubelis (tailed pepper), Myrrh, Camphor, and boletus laricis (Polyporus officinalis, a fungus).

Finally, the articles states:

The above ingredients to be digested with 500 ounces of proof spirit in a water-bath for 12 hours; then expressed and ten ounces of disulphate of quinine added; the mixture to be replaced in the water-bath till all quinine is dissolved. The liquor, when cool, is to be filtered, and is then fit for use.

Warburg's Tincture therefore contained quinine in addition to various purgatives, aromatics and carminatives.

The ingredient "Confectio Damocratis" (Damocrates' Confection) is a complex preparation, sometimes consisting of 46 different ingredients.

The prepared chalk was used to correct the otherwise extremely acrid taste of the tincture.

Dosage

A bottle of Warburg's Tincture contained about one ounce of liquid. The drug was to be administered in two equal doses, a few hours apart.

== See also ==
- History of malaria
- History of medicine
- Pharmacology
- Clinical pharmacology
- Pharmaceutical drug
- Antimalarial drugs
- Tropical disease
- List of topics characterized as pseudoscience
