= Mavis Sweeney =

Hospital Pharmacist

Marvis Grace Sweeney
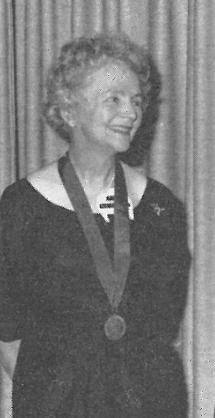
- Sweeney receiving the Evans Medal for Merit
- Born: 1909
- Died: 23 July 1986 (aged 76–77)
- Occupation: Pharmacist
- Employer: Rachel Forster Hospital
- Awards: Evans Medal for Merit

Mavis Grace Sweeney (1909 – 23 July 1986) was an Australian hospital pharmacist who was awarded the Evans Medal for Merit in 1968. The Evans Medal of Merit recognised outstanding contributions to the profession of pharmacy.

== Early years ==
Her grades at Fort Street Girls High School were excellent and she was a prefect.

== Working years ==
Sweeney was Chief Pharmacist at Rachel Forster Hospital, in Redfern, New South Wales, Australia (now part of the Royal Prince Alfred Hospital), when she received her accolade in 1968. She delivered her acceptance speech late in 1968 in Perth. Prior to this, Sweeney had previously spent an extended period of time overseas from the end of 1949 (and prior to 1958).

== Contributions to pharmacy ==
Sweeney's contributions to pharmacy include extensive involvement in establishing professional pharmacy organisations and leadership roles:

- Sweeney held numerous responsible offices in various pharmaceutical groups
- She was a founding member of the first Hospital Pharmacists Society in NSW in 1940. The group disbanded, however, after she left for overseas in 1949.
- Upon returning to Australia, Sweeney in 1958 arranged an inaugural meeting of pharmacists from hospital, academic institutions and industry.
- In 1962, she helped establish the New South Wales Branch of the Society of Hospital Pharmaceutical Chemists of Australia -today known as the NSW Branch of The Society of Hospital Pharmacists of Australia (SHPA).
- Sweeney was also elected federal president of the Association of Women Pharmaceutical Chemists of Australia in 1967

== Special interest areas ==
Sweeney's interests covered matters relating to the delivery of pharmaceutical services as an integral part of "total patient care" in a hospital setting. Her speech in 1968 elucidated both her understanding and vision of the role of pharmacy in hospital settings.

This included:

- The multifaceted processes behind the development of hospital pharmacy into the future, including teamwork psychology and communication skills.
- Transition towards the customisation of pharmacy services through a greater emphasis on individual prescriptions.
- Liaising with medical and nursing staff to create a system of checking, to ensure drugs are used for intended purposes and under safe conditions.
- Implementing imprest systems for distributing drugs on the wards to save time for nursing staff while also ensuring quality use of medicines
- Drug information services and adverse event reporting
- Effective people management to better utilise pharmacy resources in the face of growing demands on services provision
- Contribution of pharmacy to drug committees in good decision making
- Careful planning and budgeting processes, including forecasting, as part of good inventory control
- Providing lectures and career guidance on pharmacy to interested individuals

== Impact on pharmacy practice in Australia ==
The predictions Sweeney included in her 1968 oration about the development of clinical pharmacy were accurate.

They encompassed:

- Monitoring the use of drugs in patients
- Preventing medication errors
- Increasing the presence of pharmacy in hospital wards
- Adverse drug reaction reporting
- Discharge medication management
- Surveillance of drug usage

The above activities today are generally considered to be normal aspects of hospital pharmacy practice.
