= Australian Medicines Handbook =

Medicines prescribing guide

- Language: English
- Publisher: AMH Pty Ltd
- Publication place: Australia
- Pages: Approximately 1000
- ISBN: 978-0-9943262-1-8
- Website: amh.net.au

The Australian Medicines Handbook (AMH) is a peer-reviewed guide on the use of medicines for Australian health practitioners. The handbook is available in paper and digital formats and is supplemented by the AMH Aged Care Companion and the AMH Children's Dosing Companion.

== Development ==
The AMH was first published in May 1998 driven by the need for a local, independent and up-to-date source of drug information to foster rational prescribing. Reflecting contemporary Australian clinical practice and adhering to the principles of the quality use of medicines, it is generally considered the Australian equivalent to the British National Formulary on which it was partly modelled.

AMH Pty Ltd, the publishing company created to develop and maintain the AMH content, is a professional partnership between three organisations: the Australasian Society of Clinical and Experimental Pharmacologists and Toxicologists, the Pharmaceutical Society of Australia, and the Royal Australian College of General Practitioners.

== See also ==
- Australian Pharmaceutical Formulary
- British National Formulary
