= Australian Pharmaceutical Formulary =

Australian Pharmaceutical Formulary and Handbook
- Language: Australian English
- Subject: Medicine, Pharmacy
- Genre: Medical reference
- Publisher: Pharmaceutical Society of Australia
- Publication date: 1902 (1st edition)
- Publication place: Australia
- Pages: 664 (22nd edition)
- ISBN: 9780987455048 (23rd edition)

The Australian Pharmaceutical Formulary (APF) is the national formulary used by pharmacists in Australia, compiled by the Pharmaceutical Society of Australia. New editions of the APF are released every few years, with the latest edition being the 25th.

== History ==
The APF was originally a pocket-sized booklet first published in 1902, used by physicians as a drugs reference in Australia. In later editions, rather than simply being a listing of pharmaceuticals, medical and clinical information became incorporated within the publication as well, and eventually the title of the APF was extended to the Australian Pharmaceutical Formulary and Handbook.

== Content ==
The APF is divided in a number of sections, with each pertaining to a specific topic. Information includes

- Dispensing practice
- Cautionary Advisory Labels (CALs) information and recommendations
- Good compounding practice
- Compounding sterile and hazardous medicines
- Extemporaneous formulary
- Cold chain management
- Clinical drug monographs
- Information on complementary medicines
- Counseling guides for common ailments
- National pharmacy standards and guidelines, and
- Physicochemical data of drug constituents.

== See also ==
- Australian Medicines Handbook
- British Pharmacopoeia
- United States Pharmacopeia
- Martindale: The Complete Drug Reference
