= Lance Jeffs =

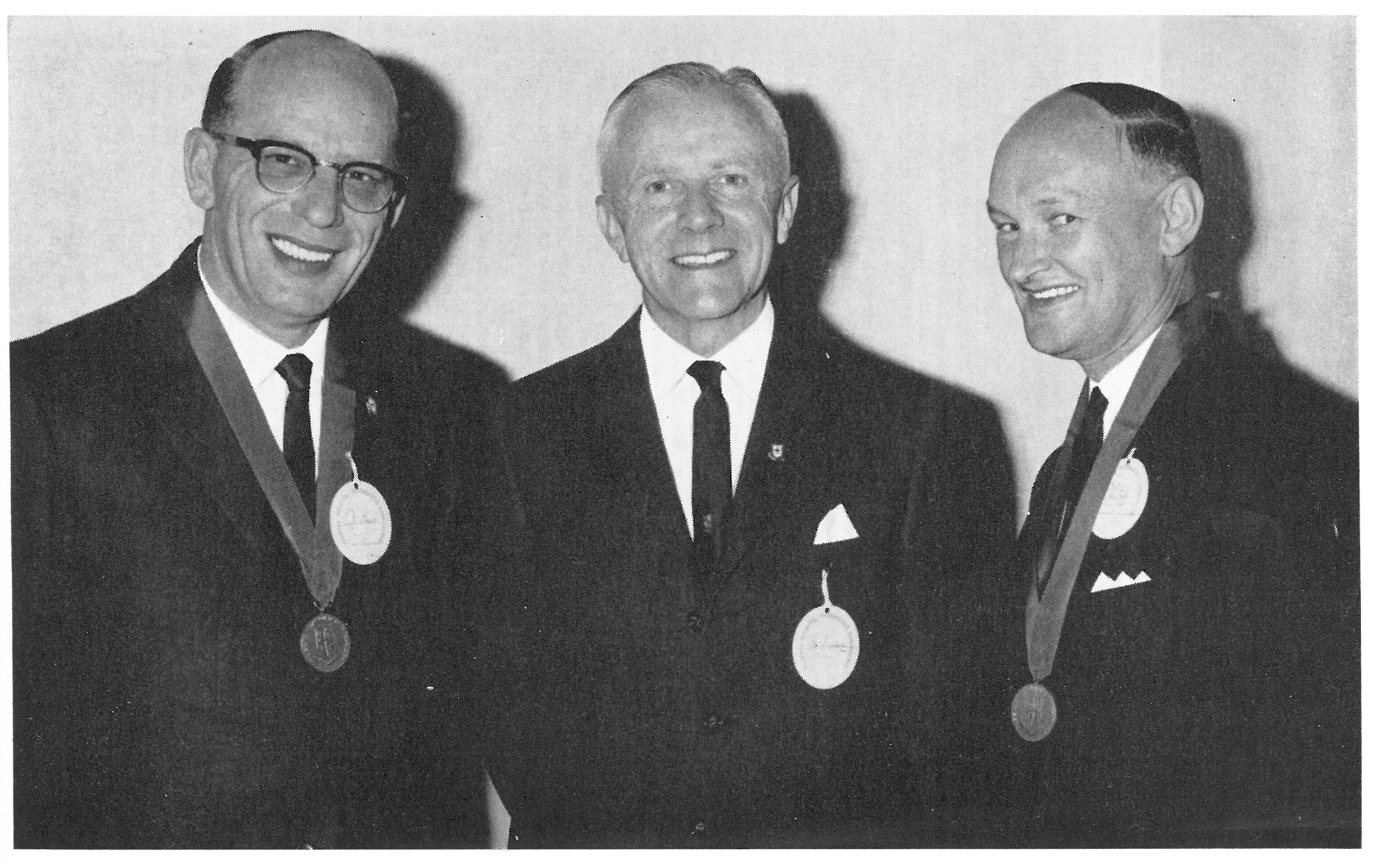
From L-R: S. Willam (Bill) Hayes, G. Ronald Davies (Director of Evans Medical Australia), P. Lance Jeffs

Lance Jeffs was an Australian pharmacist who won The Society of Hospital Pharmacists of Australia Glaxo Medal of Merit in 1965 (jointly with Bill Hayes). Jeffs was a registered pharmaceutical chemist (Ph.C) and fellow of the Society of Hospital Pharmacists of Australia. At the time of his award, Jeffs was the federal president of the Society of Hospital Pharmacists of Australia and the Chief Pharmacist at the Queen Elizabeth Hospital in South Australia. He later held the position of Chief Pharmacist at Royal Adelaide Hospital in 1968 for three years.

Jeffs was also responsible for convening the first meeting of the South Australian branch of the Society of Hospital Pharmacists and was the chairman of the first federal conference of the Society of Hospital Pharmacists in 1961.

Jeffs was also known for his work involving the methods and formulae for preparation of sterile eye drops. These methods were later used in the 1964 edition of the Australian Pharmaceutical Formulary and in overseas hospitals. The results of this work were published in The Lancet in 1965 and 1966.
