= The Society of Hospital Pharmacists of Australia =

Advanced Pharmacy Australia (AdPha), formerly The Society of Hospital Pharmacists of Australia (SHPA), is a professional association. The organisation aims to support and provide professional development to its members and be an advocate for improved medicines management in policy and practice.

Membership mostly comprises hospital pharmacists, but is open to pharmacy technicians, students and an increasingly diverse range of roles pharmacists are performing. The organisation changed its name to Advanced Pharmaciy Australia in 2024 to more inclusively represent this growing diversity in members, reflecting the expanding scope of the profession that now extends beyond traditional hospital settings. The organisation also produces various publications, including the Journal of Pharmacy Practice and Research (JPPR).

== Formation ==
The Society of Hospital Pharmacists Australia was founded in Victoria, Australia in 1941. The society's inaugural committee members include Fred J. Boyd and Charles B Macgibbon. The organisation began its first two decades as a Victorian organisation. Following the inclusion of other state branches, the SHPA became a national body in 1961.

== Structure ==
The SHPA is supported by branches, as well as committees of specialty practice. The Melbourne based secretariat, maintains the society's administrative services as directed by the member elected board. As of 2014, the society had 3268 members.

== Awards ==
=== Glaxo Medal of Merit ===
Annually for outstanding service to Australian hospital pharmacy:

- 1962 to 1971 known as the Evans Medal for Merit
- 1975 known as The Allen and Hanbury's Medal of Merit
- 1980 known as the Glaxo Medal of Merit.

Recipients:

- Fred J. Boyd, 1962
- Charles B. Macgibbon, 1963
- Bill Hayes, 1965
- Lance Jeffs, 1965
- Mavis Sweeney, 1968
- Edward (Nikk) J Phelan, 1969
- Barrie R. Miller, 1970
- Neil Naismith, 1975
- Michael Wyer, 1977
- Frank Ryan, 1979
- Bill Thomson, 1981
- Richard J. Plumridge, 1988

=== Fred J. Boyd Award ===
Biennially for outstanding contribution to Australian hospital pharmacy:

Recipients:

- Neil Naismith, 1982
- Bill Thomson, 2011

== See also ==
- Other Australian Pharmaceutical organisations
