= Bill Hayes (pharmacist) =

Australian pharmacist

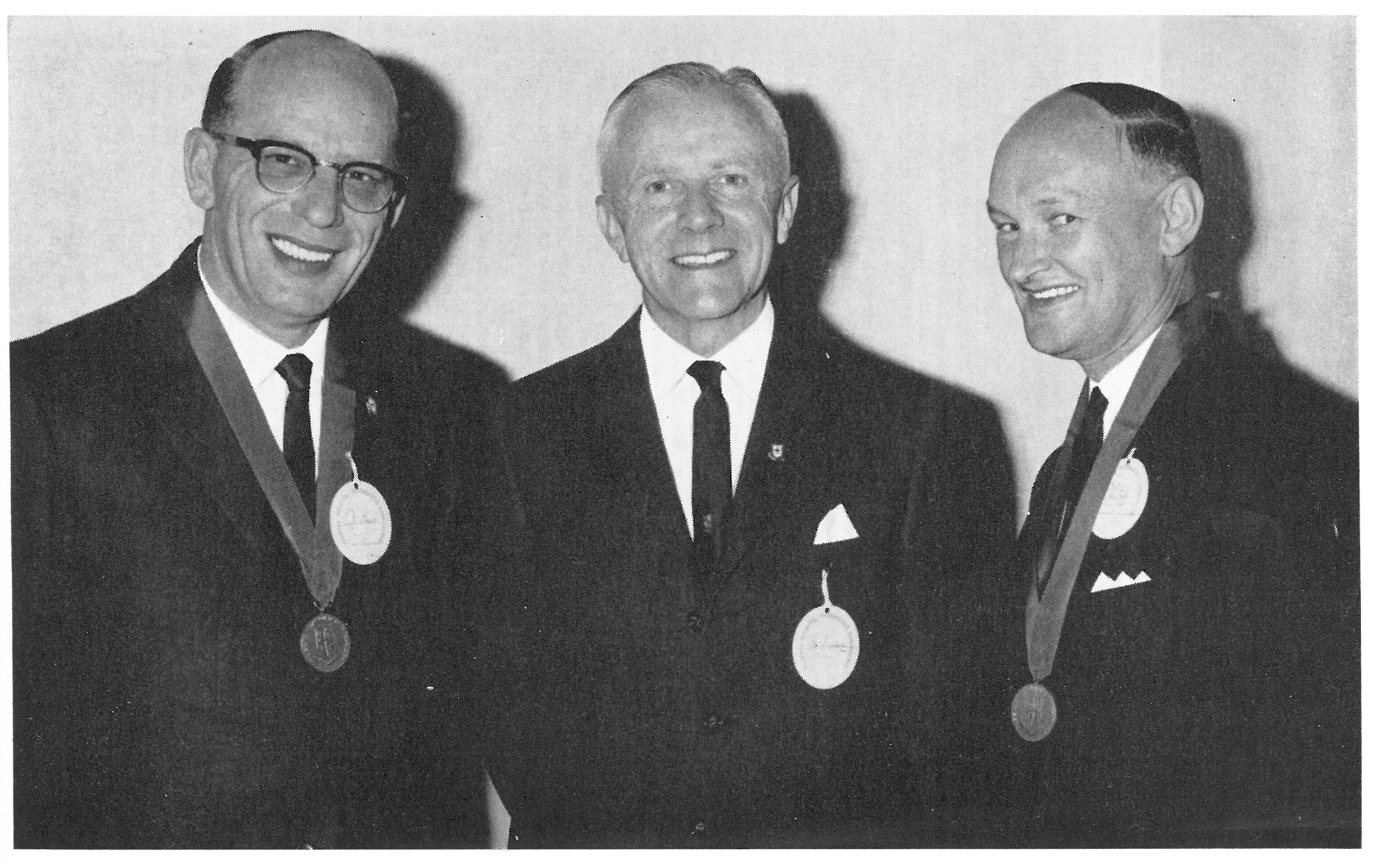
From L-R: S. Willam (Bill) Hayes, G. Ronald Davies (Director of Evans Medical Australia), P. Lance Jeffs

S.W. ('Bill') Hayes is an Australian pharmacist who won the Society of Hospital Pharmacists of Australia Glaxo Medal of Merit in 1965 (jointly with Lance Jeffs). Hayes is also a Fellow of the Society of Hospital Pharmacists of Australia and a Fellow of the Pharmaceutical Society of Australia. At the time of the award, Hayes was the Chief Pharmacist at Geelong Hospital in Victoria and Vice President of the Society of Hospital Pharmacists of Australia. He was also involved with the Society of Hospital Pharmacists at a state level for many years, including terms as Chairman of the Victorian branch.
