= Charles B. Macgibbon =

Australian pharmacist

Charles B Macgibbon played an important role in developing the hospital pharmacy profession in Australia. He was the Chief Pharmacist at the Royal Melbourne Hospital from 1938. At this time there were only 36 hospital pharmacists in the Victorian hospital system and there was virtually no collaboration between them. Charles realised that by joining together, hospital pharmacists in Victoria could strengthen the profession and contribute to better quality pharmacy services. Charles and Fred J. Boyd actively worked to create a society for hospital pharmacists. In 1941 he became the founding president of the Society of Hospital Pharmaceutical Chemists (Victorian Division) which was the forerunner to The Society of Hospital Pharmacists of Australia. During Charles' time as president of the Society, he advocated strongly to ensure hospital appointed pharmacists and that patients had access to safe medicines.

During World War II, Charles was appointed hospital representative of the Australian War Pharmacopoeia. The Australian War Pharmacopoeia was produced because of a need to find new ways to produce old drugs during war rationing. It was also produced after the Australian Health Minister was frustrated with waiting for the British Medical Association to create one. An extract from the pharmacopoeia explains: 'The present War has caused irregularities in the supply of certain drugs and difficulties now experienced in obtaining branded articles may increase. This publication was therefore produced... to help physicians by suggesting alternatives when a substance commonly prescribed by him is temporarily unobtainable.' In 1950 he successfully fought on behalf of hospital pharmacists for the right for patients to have access to the Pharmaceutical Benefits Scheme as both inpatients and outpatients of hospitals. In 1963 he was the second recipient of the Evans Medal for Merit for his work to progress professionalism of hospital pharmacists over many years.
