= Martindale: The Complete Drug Reference =

Pharmacology book

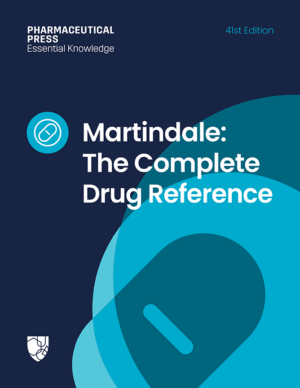
- Cover of 41st and final edition
- Author: Edited by Robert Buckingham
- Language: English
- Subject: Pharmacy, medicine
- Genre: Medicines Information
- Publisher: Pharmaceutical Press
- Publication date: May 2024 (41st edition)
- Publication place: United Kingdom
- Media type: Hardback print, digital online
- ISBN: 978-0-85711-367-2
- OCLC: 1112886663
- Website: https://www.pharmaceuticalpress.com/product/martindale-the-complete-drug-reference-41st-edition/

Martindale: The Complete Drug Reference is a reference book published by Pharmaceutical Press listing some 7,900 drugs and medicines used throughout the world, including details of over 300,000 proprietary preparations. It also includes almost 700 disease treatment reviews.

It was first published in 1883 under the title Martindale: The Extra Pharmacopoeia. Martindale contains information on drugs in clinical use worldwide, as well as selected investigational and veterinary drugs, herbal and complementary medicines, pharmaceutical excipients, vitamins and nutritional agents, vaccines, radiopharmaceuticals, contrast media and diagnostic agents, medicinal gases, drugs of abuse and recreational drugs, toxic substances, disinfectants, and pesticides.

The 41st edition of Martindale: The Complete Drug Reference is the latest and final print edition. Future updates will now only be available online through MedicinesComplete.

== International usefulness ==
Martindale aims to cover drugs and related substances reported to be of clinical interest anywhere in the world. It provides health professionals with a useful source of information to identify medicines, such as confirming the drug and brand name of a medication being taken by a patient arriving from abroad. Alternatively, if the drug is not available, the class of agent can be determined allowing a pharmacist or doctor to determine which other equivalent drugs might be substituted. Monographs include Chemical Abstracts Service (CAS) numbers, Anatomical Therapeutic Chemical Classification System (ATC) codes and FDA Unique Ingredient Identifier (UNII) codes to help readers refer to other information systems.

== Arrangement ==
Martindale is arranged into two main parts followed by three extensive indexes:

- Monographs on drugs and ancillary substances, listing over 6,600 monographs arranged in 49 chapters based on clinical use with the corresponding disease treatment reviews. Monographs summarize the nomenclature, properties, actions, and uses of each substance. A chapter on supplementary drugs and other substances covers monographs on new drugs, those not easily classified, herbals, and drugs no longer clinically used but still of interest. Monographs of some toxic substances are also included.
- Preparations - including over 200,000 items from 49 countries and regions, including China.
- Directory of Manufacturers listing some 25,000 entries.
- Pharmaceutical Terms in Various Languages: this index lists nearly 5,600 pharmaceutical terms and routes of administration in 13 major European languages as an aid to the non-native speaker in interpreting packaging, product information, or prescriptions written in another language.
- General index: prepared from over 175,000 entries it includes approved names, synonyms and chemical names; a separate Cyrillic section lists non-proprietary and proprietary names in Russian and Ukrainian.

Digital versions include an additional 1,000 drug monographs, 100,000 preparation names, and 5,000 manufacturers.

== List of the editions ==
To date there have been 41 editions of Martindale: The Complete Drug Reference. The 41st edition was published in May 2024.

== See also ==
- British National Formulary
- British National Formulary for Children
