= Fred J. Boyd =

Australian pharmacist, accountant, and radiographer

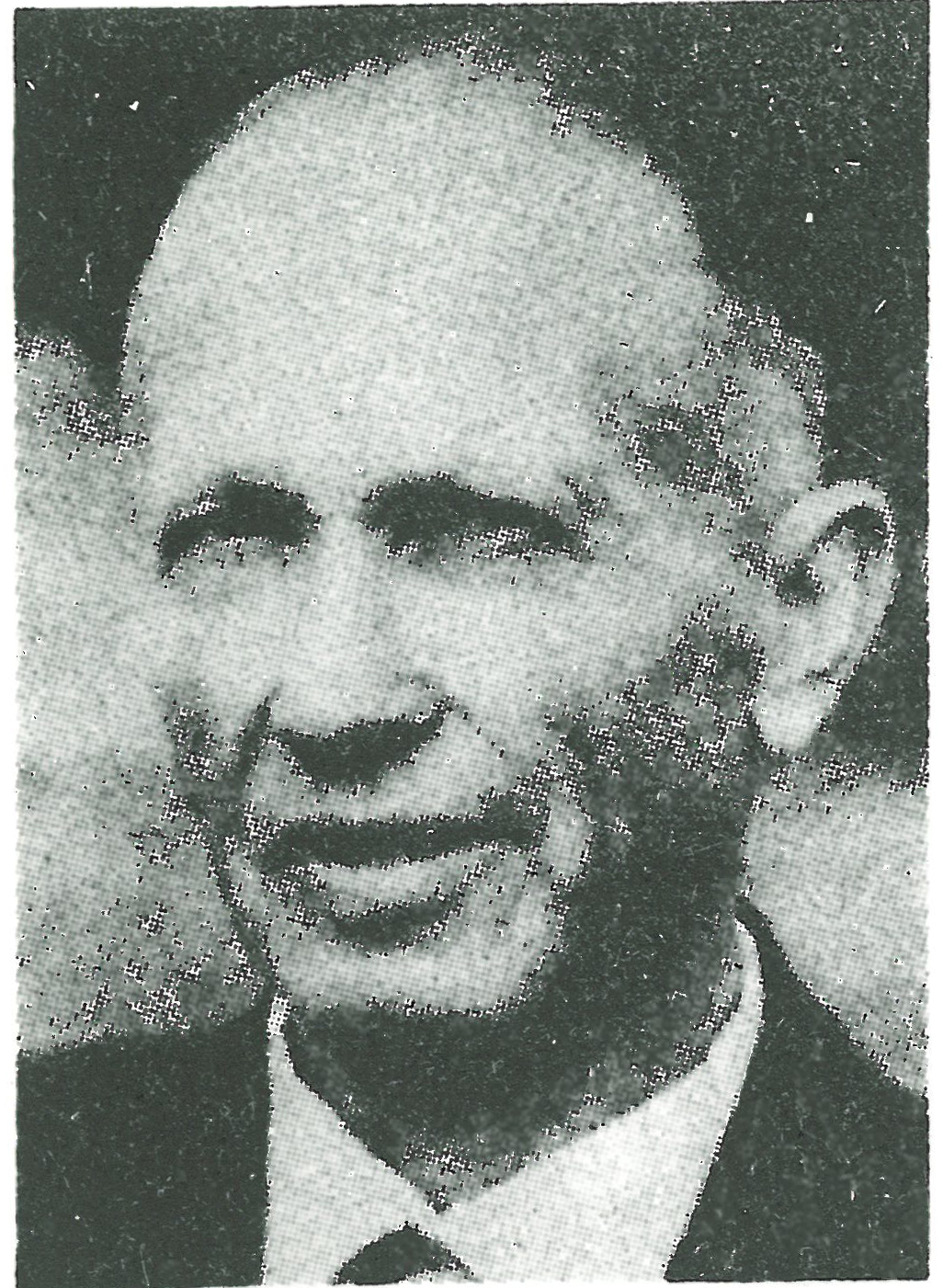
Fred J Boyd

Fred J. Boyd was an Australian pharmacist, qualified accountant, and radiographer, and the founding president of the Society of Hospital Pharmacists of Australia.

== Recognitions ==
Fred J. Boyd began working as a hospital pharmacist in the 1920s in the mental hygiene section of the Victorian Health Department. Boyd served as chief pharmacist at Mont Park Mental Hospital.

In 1940 Boyd was elected to the council of the Pharmaceutical Society of Victoria, became their librarian and was chairman of several committees.

In 1941, feeling that hospital pharmacists would benefit from coming together as a group rather than working independently, he worked closely with Charles B. Macgibbon to form The Society of Hospital Pharmaceutical Chemists. He was the first federal president of the Society of Hospital Pharmacists, from 1961-1965. He was the first recipient of the Evans Medal For Merit in 1962 (now known as the GSK Medal of Merit), for his contributions to the establishment of the Society of Hospital Pharmaceutical Chemists of Australia and for his sincerity in the field of pharmacy.

Boyd was the first editor of the Australian Journal of Hospital Pharmacy (now the Journal of Pharmacy Practice and Research).

Boyd was also interested in many community activities outside his profession. He served as the mayor of Heidelberg, Victoria, for a term (1955-1956) during which time he was presented to Queen Elizabeth II and Prince Philip, Duke of Edinburgh. He was a Justice of the Peace and was also active in the development of the Victorian Drama League, a committee established in 1952 to support amateur theatrics in Victoria, Australia. Fred J. Boyd was also a life member of the Ivanhoe Sub Cricket Club and Ivanhoe Football Club, where he was also president for twenty years.

In recognition of his contributions to the field of pharmacy, in 1978 the Federal Council of the Society of Hospital Pharmacists of Australia established a biennial award in his name in 1978, for individuals who make outstanding contribution to hospital pharmacy in Australia, with the following citation: "Whereas it was Fred J Boyd, whose vision, perseverance and dedication embodied the fundamental principles of hospital pharmacy, and whereas, Fred J Boyd practised his profession and exhibited his leadership and inspirational abilities in the State of Victoria, as well as the whole of Australia as the foundation President of SHPA."
