= Frederick Boyd (priest) =

The Ven Frederick James Boyd was archdeacon of Winnipeg from 1962 until 1966.

Boyd was educated at the University of Manitoba and ordained in 1932. After curacies at Morden and Kildonan he was on the staff of St. Alban's Cathedral, Kenora from 1939 to 1950. He was rector of St Aidan, Winnipeg from 1950 until his appointment as archdeacon; and at St Mary, Kerrisdale afterwards.
