= Farmacotherapeutisch Kompas =

Drug reference

The Farmacotherapeutisch Kompas (FK) contains a wide spectrum of information on prescribing and pharmacology, among others indications, side effects and costs of the prescription of all pharmaceutical drugs available in the Netherlands. It was first published in 1982 and is now the most used drug reference by doctors, pharmacists and students in the Netherlands. It is published by the College voor zorgverzekeringen (CVZ).

In English, the name means 'pharmacotherapeutic compass'.
