= Fred Boyd (baseball) =

- Right fielder
- Born: June 23, 1898; Blocton, Alabama, U.S.
- Died: February 24, 1923 (aged 24); Cleveland, Ohio, U.S.
- Batted: Unknown Threw: Unknown

Negro league baseball debut
- 1921, for the Cleveland Tate Stars

Last appearance
- 1922, for the Cleveland Tate Stars
- Stats at Baseball Reference

Teams
- Cleveland Tate Stars (1921-1922)

Alfred Boyd (June 23, 1898 – February 24, 1923) was an American professional baseball right fielder in the Negro leagues. He played for the Cleveland Tate Stars in 1921 and 1922.
