= Pharmaceutical Press =

British medical publishing company

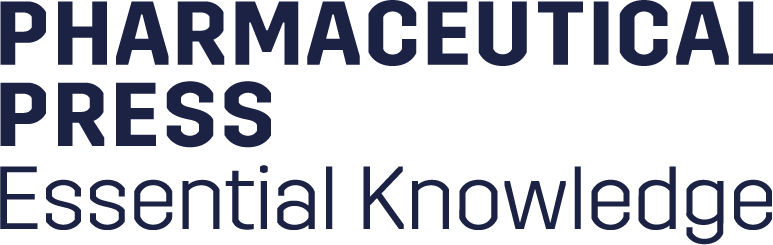
- Parent company: Royal College of Pharmacy
- Founded: 1841
- Country of origin: United Kingdom
- Headquarters location: London
- Distribution: Macmillan Distribution (UK); Login Canada (Canada); Rittenhouse, Baker & Taylor, Matthews Book Company (US)
- Publication types: Books, journals, digital products
- Nonfiction topics: Pharmacy, medicine, drug information
- Official website: www.pharmpress.com

Pharmaceutical Press is the publishing arm of the Royal College of Pharmacy (formerly the Royal Pharmaceutical Society of Great Britain). It is a provider of independent pharmaceutical information.

Its principal publishing focus is the design, manufacture and therapeutic use of medicines, as well as the professional concerns of those working to ensure their safe administration and use. Its international catalogue contains more than 150 print and digital works, with a range of products consisting of reference works, textbooks, professional titles and subscription products.

The most renowned resources include:

- Martindale: The complete drug reference – a drug reference book providing unbiased, evaluated information on all drugs and medicines in clinical use.
- British National Formulary and British National Formulary for Children – the UK standard reference in the use and concise choice of medicines, published in conjunction with the BMJ Group.
- Pharmaceutical Journal and PJ Publications – the official weekly journal of the Royal College of Pharmacy, providing news coverage on all aspects of pharmacy, and original research and articles on pharmaceutical and related subjects.
- MedicinesComplete – an online service bringing together trusted knowledge providing medicines information and expert guidance on the safe use and administration of drugs and medicines.
- The 41st edition of Martindale: The Complete Drug Reference is the latest and final print edition. Future updates will now only be available online through MedicinesComplete.
