= British National Formulary for Children =

Book by the British Medical Association

BNF for Children
- The standard cover design is easily identified with each annual edition distinguished by a different jacket colour. The edition pictured is the 2022-2023 edition.
- Author: Pharmaceutical Press, the Royal Pharmaceutical Society's knowledge business
- Language: British English
- Subject: Medicine, Pharmacy
- Genre: Medicines Information
- Publisher: BMJ, Pharmaceutical Press, Royal College of Paediatrics and Child Health, Neonatal & Paediatric Pharmacy Group
- Publication date: September 2022 (2022-2023 edition)
- Publication place: United Kingdom
- Media type: Paperback print, digital online, smartphone app
- Pages: 1287
- ISBN: 978-0-85711-429-7
- OCLC: 1338670038
- Website: www.bnf.org

BNF for Children (BNF for Children) is the standard UK paediatric reference for prescribing and pharmacology.

It contains a wide range of information and advice on prescribing for children - from newborn to adolescence. The entries are classified by group of drug, giving cautions for use, side effects, indications and dose for most of the drugs available for children in the UK National Health Service. It also includes information on the unlicensed uses of certain drugs. Though published in and for the United Kingdom, the vast bulk of the clinical information will apply in any country.

== Authorship and Publication ==
BNF for Children is jointly published annually by BMJ (owned by the BMA), Pharmaceutical Press (owned by the RPS), Royal College of Paediatrics and Child Health, and the Neonatal & Paediatric Pharmacy Group. The principal contributors are acknowledged in the front pages.

It is overseen by BNF for Children Paediatric Formulary Committee and edited by a team of pharmacists.

== History ==
BNF for Children developed from the British National Formulary (BNF), which prior to 2005 had provided information on the treatment of children, with the doses largely determined by calculations based on the body weight of the child. The guidance was provided by pharmacists and doctors whose expertise was in the care of adults.

This was an anomaly, as in relation to responses to medicines, the difference between a newborn and a sixteen-year-old is greater than the difference between a sixteen-year-old and a sixty-year-old. Starting in 2002, Prof Martin Kendall, then chairman of BNF Joint Formulary Committee worked to get things changed.

The first edition was published in 2005, with George Rylance chairing the Paediatric Formulary Committee and Dinesh Mehta as the first executive editor. Anne, the Princess Royal attended the launch on 14 July.

== Editions ==
BNF for Children is published annually, but electronic updates are produced monthly. The current 2022-2023 edition was published in September 2022.

== Availability ==
Though not aimed at the general public, BNF for Children, like BNF, is available for purchase.

It is provided to NHS staff - usually through their employer, but may be accessed online through MedicinesComplete.

The app is available through the usual app stores.

== Contents ==
- How BNF and BNFC are constructed
- How to use BNF and BNFC in print
- Changes
- Guidance on Prescribing
- Prescription writing
- Supply of medicines
- Emergency supply of medicines
- Controlled drugs and drug dependence
- Adverse reactions to drugs
- Guidance on intravenous infusions
- Prescribing in hepatic impairment
- Prescribing in renal impairment
- Prescribing in pregnancy
- Prescribing in breast-feeding
- Prescribing in palliative care
- Drugs and sport
- Medicines optimisation
- Antimicrobial stewardship
- Prescribing in dental practice
- NOTES ON DRUGS AND PREPARATIONS
- 1 Gastro-intestinal system
- 2 Cardiovascular system
- 3 Respiratory system
- 4 Nervous system
- 5 Infection
- 6 Endocrine system
- 7 Genito-urinary system
- 8 Immune system and malignant disease
- 9 Blood and nutrition
- 10 Musculoskeletal system
- 11 Eye
- 12 Ear, nose and oropharynx
- 13 Skin
- 14 Vaccines
- 15 Anaesthesia
- 16 Emergency treatment of poisoning
- APPENDICES AND INDICES
- Interactions
- Borderline substances
- Cautionary and advisory labels for dispensed medicines
- Dental Practitioners' Formulary
- Nurse Prescribers' Formulary
- Non-medical prescribing
- Index of manufacturers
- Special-order Manufacturers
- Index
- Medical emergencies in the community

== See also ==
- British National Formulary
- Pharmacopeia
- Pharmacy
- Specification (technical standard)
- Royal Pharmaceutical Society
- Pharmaceutical Press
