= British National Formulary =

Pharmaceutical reference book for the UK

British National Formulary (BNF)
- The cover of BNF 91 (March 2026)
- Author: Joint Formulary Committee
- Language: British English
- Release number: 91
- Subject: Medicine, Pharmacy
- Genre: Medicines Information
- Publisher: BMJ and Pharmaceutical Press
- Publication date: 18 March 2026
- Publication place: United Kingdom
- Media type: Paperback print, digital online, smartphone app
- Pages: 2080
- ISBN: 9780857114969
- Website: www.bnf.org

The British National Formulary (BNF) is a United Kingdom (UK) pharmaceutical reference book that contains a wide spectrum of information and advice on prescribing and pharmacology, along with specific facts and details about many medicines available on the UK National Health Service (NHS). Information within the BNF includes indication(s), contraindications, side effects, doses, legal classification, names and prices of available proprietary and generic formulations, and any other notable points. Though it is a national formulary, it nevertheless also includes entries for some medicines which are not available under the NHS, and must be prescribed and/or purchased privately. A symbol clearly denotes such drugs in their entry.

It is used by pharmacists and doctors (both general practitioners (GPs) and generalist hospital practitioners) and by other prescribing healthcare professionals (such as nurses, pharmacy technicians, paramedics, and dentists); as a reference for correct dosage, indication, interactions and side effects of drugs. It is also used for reassurance by those administering drugs, for example a nurse on a hospital ward, and even for patients and others seeking an authoritative source of advice on any aspect of pharmacotherapy.

== Development ==
Many individuals and organisations contribute towards the preparation of the BNF. It is authored by Pharmaceutical Press, the Royal Pharmaceutical Society's (RPS) knowledge business; and is jointly published by the BMJ Group (owned by the BMA), and Pharmaceutical Press (owned by the RPS). It is published under the authority of a Joint Formulary Committee (JFC), which comprises pharmacy, medical, nursing, and lay representatives; there are also representatives from the Medicines and Healthcare products Regulatory Agency (MHRA), the UK Health Departments, and a national guideline producer.

Information on drugs is drawn from the manufacturers' product literature, medical and pharmaceutical literature, regulatory authorities and professional bodies. Advice is constructed from clinical literature, and reflects, as far as possible, an evaluation of the evidence from diverse sources. The BNF also takes account of authoritative national guidelines and emerging safety concerns. In addition, the Joint Formulary Committee takes advice on all therapeutic areas from advisers from expert groups; this ensures that the BNF's recommendations are relevant to practice. In September 2016, the National Institute for Health and Care Excellence (NICE) in the UK gave NICE accreditation to the processes to produce BNF publications; a further review in 2021 resulted in the successful renewal of accreditation.

== History ==
It was first published in 1949, as the National Formulary, with updated versions appearing every three years until 1976. The fifth version in 1957 saw its name change to The British National Formulary. A new-look version, under the auspices of Owen Wade, was released in 1981. A study in Northern Ireland, looking at prescribing in 1965, reported that the BNF was likely able to serve the requirements of prescribers in general practice, while also achieving a cost saving. By 2003, issue 46 of the BNF contained 3000 interactions or groups of interactions, with about 900 of these marked by a bullet.

== Editions ==
A new edition of the BNF book is published twice yearly, in March and September. As of March 2026, the latest edition is the 91st. Each new edition has a new colour for the cover.

== Availability ==
BNF content is available digitally via a website and mobile app, and as a book. The book is available for purchase. In 2023, NICE announced their decision to stop the supply of print BNF to NHS organisations in England. The same decision was made by Scotland and Wales. NHS workers and healthcare professionals in the HINARI group of developing nations are entitled to free access via MedicinesComplete following registration (requires provision of a name, an address, an email address, and a phone number). Other visitors can subscribe to the BNF on MedicinesComplete. Healthcare organisations can also subscribe to a customisable BNF via their corporate online intranet. In 2017, BNF Publications released applications for offline access to the BNF on iOS and Android devices. Monthly content updates are available, over an internet connection. NICE provides a website providing the content of the BNF for non-commercial to the public, including non-NHS users.

The BNF also includes the Nurse Prescribers' Formulary (NPF) and other NPF content for use by District Nurses and Specialist Community Public Health Nurses (including Health Visitors), who have received training to become nurse prescribers.

== Sister publications ==
The British National Formulary for Children (British National Formulary for Children) book, first published September 2005, is published yearly, and details the doses and uses of medicines in children from neonates to adolescents.

== BNF sections ==
The British National Formulary is divided into various sections; with the main sections on drugs and preparations being organised by body system.

Table of Contents

- Preface
- Acknowledgements
- How BNF publications are constructed
- How to use the BNF
- Changes
- Guidance on prescribing
- Prescription writing
- Emergency supply of medicines
- Controlled drugs and drug dependence
- Adverse reactions to drugs
- Guidance on intravenous infusions
- Medicines optimisation
- Antimicrobial stewardship
- Prescribing for children
- Prescribing in hepatic impairment
- Prescribing in renal impairment
- Prescribing in pregnancy
- Prescribing in breast-feeding
- Prescribing in palliative care
- Prescribing for the elderly
- Drugs and sport
- Prescribing in dental practice

Notes on drugs and preparations

1. Gastro-intestinal system
2. Cardiovascular system
3. Respiratory system
4. Nervous system
5. Infection
6. Endocrine system
7. Genito-urinary system
8. Malignant disease
9. Blood and nutrition
10. Musculoskeletal system
11. Eye
12. Ear, nose, and oropharynx
13. Skin
14. Vaccines
15. Anaesthesia
16. Emergency treatment of poisoning

Appendices and indices

- Appendix 1 Interactions
- Appendix 2 Borderline substances
- Appendix 3 Cautionary and advisory labels for dispensed medicines
- Appendix 4 Wound management products and elasticated garments
- Dental Practitioners' Formulary
- Nurse Prescribers' Formulary
- Non-medical prescribing
- Index of proprietary manufacturers
- Special-order manufacturers

== See also ==
- Pharmacopeia
- Specification (technical standard)
