= Pharmaceutical Society of Australia =

Professional organisation of Australian pharmacists

Leadership
- National President: Prof. Mark Naunton since Jan 2026
- Chief Executive Officer: Bridget Totterman since December 2025

Meeting place
- Level 1, 17 Denison Street Deakin West, ACT, Australia

Website
- www.psa.org.au

The Pharmaceutical Society of Australia (PSA) is the only government-recognised, national body representing Australia's 42,000+ pharmacists across all practice settings.

With approximately 20,000 members, PSA is the major provider of continuing professional development programmes for pharmacists in Australia. The PSA also organises various pharmacy events including a national conference attended by over 1,200 delegates from around Australia and internationally.

The PSA publishes the Australian Pharmaceutical Formulary, the Australian Pharmacist journal, and various other pharmacy publications.

Members of PSA are entitled to use the postnominal MPS, while Fellows of the Society are entitled to use FPS.

== History ==
The Pharmaceutical Society of Australia (PSA) is the national professional organisation for pharmacists in Australia. The National PSA was formed in 1977 and was made up of state pharmaceutical societies, several of which were in existence before Federation. The Western Australian branch was the only one that retains a regulatory role, similar to the Royal Pharmaceutical Society of Great Britain, whereas the other branches were incorporated societies. Each of these State Societies retained their autonomy, but accepted direction from the PSA National Council. Because the Council of the Pharmaceutical Society in Western Australia was responsible for the administration of the Pharmacy Act in this state, it was unable to subjugate itself to a form of federal control. This role ceased when the national registration scheme under national law came in to effect when the Pharmacy Board of Australia came into effect in 2009 under the auspices of the Australian Health Professional Registration Agency (AHPRA).

There was a branch in each state and in the Australian Capital Territory.

Unification as One PSA occurred in 2008. The establishment of the PSA was aimed at providing the profession not only with a national identity, but an opportunity to more effectively regulate its affairs, to achieve better coordination in consultation and liaison with the Commonwealth Government, other professions and industry.

The PSA's purpose at unification was to enable pharmacists to optimise their contribution to improved health outcomes for the community through excellence in the practice of pharmacy. The key objectives for which the PSA is established include:

- optimise the role of pharmacists in the health care system
- set the ethical/professional standards and responsibilities of pharmacists
- develop education, continuing education and training programs
- formulate policies for the effective practice of pharmacy
- protect the rights, privileges and professional status of pharmacy

There are some states where the state entity remains. The Pharmaceutical Society of Victoria remains in place to serve Victorian members of PSA.

== Membership (MPS or FPS) ==
There are 42,000+ registered pharmacists in Australia, who are all eligible for membership along with pharmacy students, pre-registration pharmacists. Members can use the post-nominal MPS (members of the Pharmaceutical Society). Pharmacy students receive free membership. Pre-registration pharmacists, also known as interns, must successfully complete an approved Intern Training Program. If they elect to undertake the Intern Training Program through PSA, then their membership is included in the course fees.

=== (FPS) Fellowship ===
There are two different pathways for fellowship. All nominations for fellowship have to be approved by the board. Fellowship is granted to pharmacists in recognition of their achievements or contribution. Alternatively, pharmacists are eligible to become a life-time fellow after 50 years of continuous membership.

It is uncommon for a pharmacist to be elevated to fellow with only 66 pharmacists (0.001%) recognised as fellows. There are 650 pharmacists who are life-time fellows (0.08%). This low rate means that it is considered a great honour to be elevated to a fellow.

Fellows continue to pay for membership, whereas lifetime fellows are provided with free membership.

Fellows can use the post-nominal "FPS".

== Structure ==
PSA is a unified national society that operates to serve its members (pharmacy students, interns and pharmacists in Australia).

=== State Branch Committees ===
The state branches (Tasmania, Victoria, South Australia and Northern Territory, New South Wales, Queensland, Canberra, and Western Australia) have branch committees with representatives elected by the members. Each state branch committee elects a president and two vice-presidents. Each person is eligible to remain on the branch committee for up to five consecutive three-year terms (a total of fifteen years). After the five consecutive terms, the member must not hold a position for at least three years before they are eligible to nominate again. The five terms were all considered to have commenced from the time the state branches unified to a single national body in 2008. This means that long standing members who have served on the branch committees since the time of unification will have completed their five-year terms in 2023.

=== National board ===
The national board is a decision-making body with the power to make binding decisions on branches. The national board consists of one branch committee member from each state who is elected to the national board, except Victoria and New South Wales who have two national board members elected from the branch committee as they have a larger number of members. There is also a board member selected by application to represent early career members, defined as a pharmacist who has been registered for less than 10 years. A board member can serve a maximum of five consecutive three-year terms for a total of fifteen years.

==== National presidents of the PSA ====
The presidents and vice-presidents of the PSA are elected annually from the members of the Board. The president can serve a term of up to four years. The maximum term had been three years until 2013, which had previously been extended from a maximum of two years in 2002. Since the organisation was nationally unified in 2008, the President and Vice Presidents have taken office on 1 July each year for a 12-month term.

=== National sub-committees ===
The society has sub-committees that inform and support the work of the board. The sub-committees include the Finance committee, Policy Advice Committee and Practice Support and Education.

=== National practice leadership groups ===
In 2018, new leadership groups were formed to support practice in specialised areas including general practice pharmacists and medication review pharmacists and diabetes education. These new leadership groups replied the two former special interest groups (SIGs) for accredited pharmacists and rural pharmacists. The SIGs had a representative from each state, with the potential to co-opt an additional member if required. The leadership group draws its membership by skill and expertise rather than geographic representative.

== Functions and roles ==
The Pharmaceutical Society of Australia has been recognised by the government as the peak professional body for pharmacists in Australia. It has approximately 18000 members around Australia, and approximately 200 members have been elevated to fellowship status to recognise extraordinary contributions to the profession, organisation or health care.

=== Advocacy ===
The society's main focus is advocacy for excellence in medicines management and the pharmacy profession.

=== Career Pathways ===
Career pathways to describe the progression into specific areas of pharmacy practice such as general practice pharmacy, diabetes educator, community pharmacy management and professional services pharmacist have been developed since 2014. These career pathways are still in development, and aim to provide pharmacists with a road map on how to develop the necessary skills and access required resources for practice in these areas. The career pathways are supported and informed by the Leadership Group that provides expert direction and leadership in the field.

=== Practice recognition - Advanced Practice ===
The society is actively championing Advanced Practice Pharmacist recognition. It has developed an online portal that provides further information on the recognition pathway. The organisation functions as a Readiness Support Organisation as a supportive resource for pharmacists seeking to undergo recognition for Advanced Practice.

=== Education ===
The society provides education and training to its members. As a registered training organisation, it provides qualifications as well as continuing professional education at live events, online and in print. The Ignite program for future leaders is one of its flagship programs, providing leadership training and skill development for young pharmacists. The intern training program for pre-registrant pharmacists is another key PSA education program.

== Events ==
The Pharmaceutical Society of Australia runs an annual conference that attracts approximately 1000 delegates in June or July each year. The conference attracts significant attention for the stimulating debate and high quality education it offers each year.

State-based conferences are held annually in some states. The most notable is the Victorian Pharmacy Conference in April each year, that is attended by approximately 200 to 300 pharmacists annually. It is run on the same weekend as the Victorian Pharmacy Student Conference. The state conferences allow local members to experience a large conference without having to travel interstate, while also providing an opportunity for the national conference organising committee to identify potential speakers.

== Publications ==
The Australian Pharmacist is the society's peer-reviewed journal that is published monthly in print, and began digital publication in 2017. The journal includes news columns, professional updates, news, advice, research summaries and education articles.

The Australian Pharmaceutical Formulary, the only compulsory text for Australian pharmacies, is compiled by the Pharmaceutical Society of Australia.

The PSA leads writing professional practice guidance resources and the practice standards.

== Excellence awards ==
The three excellence awards are announced at the annual conference each year. These awards recognise three practitioners for excellence in one or more of Pharmacy Practice Research, Pharmacy Practice Innovation, Pharmacy as a Community Service and Advancing Pharmacy Practice.

=== PSA Early Career Pharmacist of the Year ===
The Pharmaceutical Society of Australia awards a silver medal each year to a pharmacist aged under 35 years or registered for less than 10 years. It was renamed in 2016 to the Early Career Pharmacist of the Year. Prior to 2016, it had been known as the Young Pharmacist of the Year award.

== See also ==
- List of pharmacy associations
