= List of pharmacy associations =

The following is a list of organizations for professionals involved in the practice of pharmacy. Such organizations are typically professional societies, as opposed to trade associations.

== International ==
- International Pharmaceutical Federation
- International Pharmaceutical Students' Federation
- World Pharmacy Council

== European ==
- European Association of Employed Community Pharmacists in Europe
- Pharmaceutical Group of the European Union

== Australia ==
- Australian College of Pharmacy
- Pharmaceutical Society of Australia
- The Pharmacy Guild of Australia
- The Society of Hospital Pharmacists of Australia

== Bangladesh ==
- Bangladesh Pharmaceutical Society

== Canada ==
- Canadian Pharmacists Association
- Canadian Society of Hospital Pharmacists
- Ontario Pharmacists Association

== China ==
- Chinese Pharmaceutical Association

== Denmark ==
- Danish Association of Pharmaconomists

== Ireland ==
- Pharmaceutical Society of Ireland

== Israel ==
- The Pharmaceutical Association of Israel

== New Zealand ==
- Pharmaceutical Society Of New Zealand

== Norway ==
- Norwegian Pharmacy Association

== Pakistan ==
- Pakistan Pharmacists Association

== Portugal ==
- Portuguese Pharmaceutical Industry Association

== United Kingdom ==
- National Pharmacy Association
- Pharmaceutical Society of Northern Ireland
- Royal Pharmaceutical Society

== India ==
- Pharmacy Council of India
- Indian Pharmacist Association
- AICTE
- West Bengal University of Health Sciences

== United States ==
- American Association of Colleges of Pharmacy
- American Pharmacists Association
- American Society for Pharmacy Law
- American Society of Consultant Pharmacists
- American Society of Health-System Pharmacists
- Professional Compounding Centers of America
- American College of Clinical Pharmacy
- College of Psychiatric and Neurologic Pharmacists

== Ghana ==
- Pharmaceutical Society of Ghana

== See also ==
- History of pharmacy
- International Pharmaceutical Federation
- List of pharmacy schools
- List of pharmacy organizations in the United Kingdom
