= Nadia Bukhari =

British pharmacist

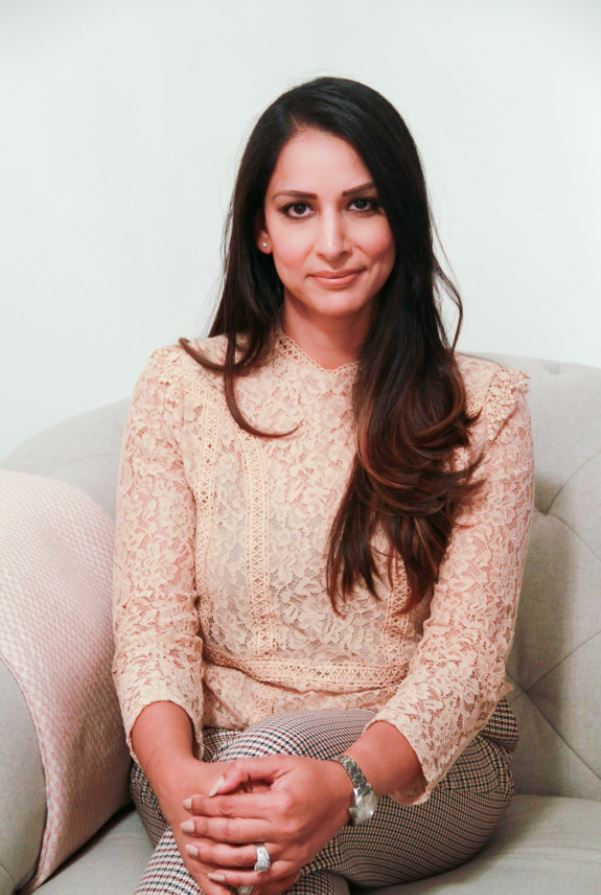
- Born: London, United Kingdom
- Education: Pharmacist
- Alma mater: UCL School of Pharmacy
- Occupations: Pharmacist, Associate Professor, Activist for Gender Equity in education and healthcare industry.
- Known for: First Muslim female and British Pakistani board member of the Fellow of the Royal Pharmaceutical Society (RPS) for England, UK
- Honours: Fellow of the Royal Pharmaceutical Society (RPS)
- Website: Nadia Bukhari at UCL

Nadia Bukhari is a British pharmacist. In 2018, she was awarded the status of Fellow of the Royal Pharmaceutical Society (RPS) making her the youngest female fellow under the Royal Pharmaceutical Society of Great Britain; an honor bestowed to those who have achieved excellence and distinction in their pharmacy career. In addition, she is the first Muslim female and British Pakistani to be a board member of the National Association of Boards of Pharmacy for England, UK.

Since 2003, she has worked at University College London (UCL). She has published in the fields of pharmacy and leadership. In Pakistan, she launched the National Alliance for Women in Pharmacy (NAWP) under the Pakistan Pharmacists Association (PPA).

She is the global lead at the International Pharmaceutical Federation (FIP) to promote gender equity in the pharmaceutical industry. She has served as a trustee and an ambassador for the Pakistan Alliance for Girls Education (PAGE); a charity program supported by the Government of Pakistan. She is also an executive committee member at Indus Health Network UK.

In 2021, she launched Equity Pakistan, and is the UK director of the initiative; a gender equity hub for the pharmaceutical workforce in Pakistan; a collaborated initiative taken by Hamdard University Islamabad Campus and University College London (UCL).

She was the chief pharmacist at doctHERs; a telemedicine company in Pakistan enabling home-based healthcare females to work in the pharmaceutical industry and connect with low-income patients across Pakistan.

Following her departure from doctHERs, Bukhari co-founded ‘Siha Health & Wellness’ and is the Chief Operating Officer.

== Early life and education ==
Bukhari was born into a family of Pakistani descent and was raised in London. She graduated from the School of Pharmacy, the University of London in 1999. She received her postgraduate diploma as a pharmacist in the year 2006. Later in 2008, she did a postgraduate diploma in teaching & learning for higher education from the Institute of Education, University of London. In 2011, she studied professional counseling from Oxford College while for further pharmacy education from Higher Education Academy, London. She has a Ph.D. from University College London and her area of research focusses on leadership and pharmacy.

== Career ==
In 2000, Bukhari started her professional career as a pharmacy manager at Westbury Chemist in Streatham, UK. After a year, she moved to work for Bart's and the London NHS Trust, London as a clinical pharmacist for the surgical and musculoskeletal directorate. In 2003, she began to work in academia at University College London (UCL) as an academic facilitator, teaching fellow, and pre-registration coordinator; her area of research is pharmacy and leadership.

Since 2003, she has published various titles in the Pharmaceutical Press and BMC Series. Later in 2014, she became a senior teaching fellow in the same university. She had also joined the Royal Pharmaceutical Society of Great Britain for a year.

In 2015, Bukhari was awarded the status of Fellow of the Royal Pharmaceutical Society (RPS) for her excellence and contributions towards the profession of pharmacy. In the same year, she co-hosted an event at RPS to talk about women in a leadership role. In 2016, she was invited by the South African Pharmacy Council (SAPC) to speak about the UK pharmaceutical practices.

Since 2017, Bukhari has also been an advisor to the Commonwealth Pharmacists Association and British Islamic Medical Association. In addition, she has been mentoring students globally. Later in the year 2017, she became the youngest female, an Asian Muslim and a British Pakistani to be elected as the board member at English National Pharmacy Board, UK. In the same year, she began to serve as an ambassador for the Pakistan Alliance for Girls Education (PAGE); an initiative taken by the support of the Government of Pakistan to promote girls' education across the country.

In 2018, she was appointed to be the Principal Teaching Fellow at UCL School of Pharmacy. In the same year, she participated in Pharmaceutical Care Conference and represented UCL on the invitation by the Ministry of Health (MOH) in Oman.

In 2019, she became the global lead of gender equity at the International Pharmaceutical Federation (FIP), a trustee of Pakistan Alliance for Girls Education (PAGE) and stepped down from the responsibilities of the National Pharmacy Board, UK. In the same year, she also launched National Alliance for Women in Pharmacy (NAWP) under Pakistan Pharmacists Association (PPA) to support opportunities for female pharmacists across Pakistan.

In 2019, She has received the honor to represent the Pakistani community in an event arranged by the Royal Household of the United Kingdom at Aga Khan Centre in London. In the same year, she was invited by Hamdard University Islamabad Campus and other leading academic institutes to multiple events as a guest speaker to share her experience, promote gender equity, and leadership roles in the pharmaceutical industry of Pakistan.

In 2020, she joined Indus Health Network UK as an executive committee member and became part of the charitable programs conducted by the hospital. Also, she joined doctHERs as the Chief Pharmacist; a tech-enabled pharmacy and healthcare consultancy service in Pakistan for underserved patients.

In 2021, she started to work as the director of Equity Pakistan, an initiative that can address the lack of gender diversity in the pharmaceutical industry and perform necessary activities to create a gender balance in the field. It is launched under the collaboration of University College London (UCL) and Hamdard University Islamabad Campus in Islamabad, Pakistan.

== Philanthropy ==
Bukhari has been working for charitable programs, reducing the gender gap, and other philanthropy projects. The prominent projects are following:

- In 2017, she began to serve as a trustee and an ambassador for the Pakistan Alliance for Girls Education (PAGE) to reduce the gender gap and increase access to education for all females across Pakistan.
- In 2019, she became the global lead at International Pharmaceutical Federation (FIP) to advocate for gender equity in the workforce of the pharmaceutical industry.
- In 2019, while serving as an ambassador for the Pakistan Alliance for Girls Education (PAGE), she also became its trustee to support female education across Pakistan.
- In 2019, she launched the National Alliance for Women in Pharmacy (NAWP) under Pakistan Pharmacists Association (PPA) to provide opportunities for females pharmacists in the health industry across Pakistan.
- In 2020, she joined Indus Health Network UK as an executive committee member to advocate and raise funds for the charity programs of the hospital.
- In 2020, she began to work as the chief pharmacist at doctHERs; a telemedicine company connecting home-based and underutilized female healthcare workers to serve low-income patients remotely through technology. Under Bukhari's leadership role, they have launched projects in the rural areas of Pakistan where the community health workers, like Guddi Bajis, are selling the medicines to underserved patients under the supervision of telehealthcare workers of doctHERs.
- In 2021, she became the Director of Equity Pakistan; a gender equity hub created to address the issues related to gender inequities in the pharmaceutical workforce of Pakistan.

== Honors and awards ==
Bukhari received the following honors and awards throughout her career:

- She was a member of the winning team for 'Training & Development' at C+D Awards 2015.
- She received the honor of being the youngest Asian Muslim female Fellow by the Royal Pharmaceutical Society (RPS) in 2015.
- She is the first Muslim female and British Pakistani to be a board member of the National Association of Boards of Pharmacy for England in 2017.
- She has been titled as the ‘UCL Global Pharmacy Ambassador’ for her global advocacy work and nominated for the Provost's Global Engagement Awards 2018.
