= UCL Faculty of Life Sciences =

Faculty of University College London

- Dean: Professor Gail Taylor
- Administrative staff: 964 (academic, research and professional service staff as of October 2022)
- Students: 2,632 (undergraduate (2022/23)); 1,676 (graduate (2022/23))
- Location: London, United Kingdom
- Website: UCL Faculty of Life Sciences

The UCL Faculty of Life Sciences is one of the 11 constituent faculties of University College London (UCL).

== History ==
The roots of UCL’s Faculty of Life Sciences can be traced back to 1826, when the Chairs of Botany and Comparative Anatomy were established; with the Departments of Zoology, Cell Biology, Genetics, Botany and Microbiology all stemming from the Chair of Botany.

Since the Faculty’s establishment it has contributed to many major breakthroughs in history including Nobel Prize winner, James Black, work on β-blockers and histamine H2 receptor antagonists.

Most recently, the School of Pharmacy, established in 1842, merged with UCL in 2012, becoming one of two divisions within the Faculty of Life Sciences.

== Departments and divisions ==
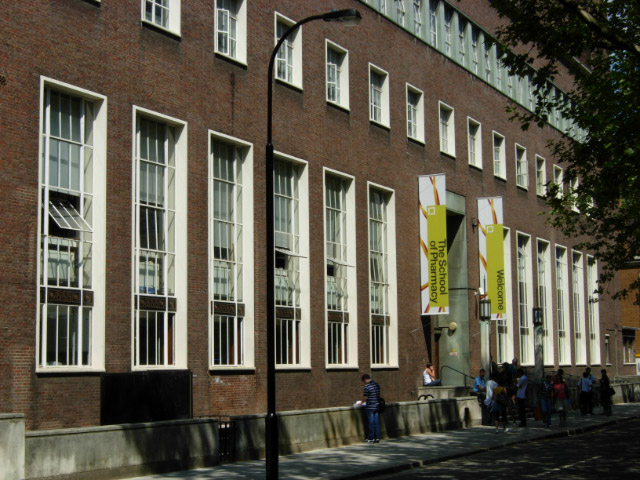
The main entrance to the UCL School of Pharmacy building

The Faculty currently comprises the following departments, divisions and institutes:

- UCL Division of Biosciences
  - UCL Research Department of Cell and Developmental Biology
  - UCL Research Department of Genetics, Evolution and Environment
  - UCL Research Department of Neuroscience, Physiology and Pharmacology
  - UCL Research Department of Structural and Molecular Biology
- Laboratory for Molecular Cell Biology (LMCB) at UCL
- Gatsby Computational Neuroscience Unit
- UCL School of Pharmacy
- Sainsbury Wellcome Centre for Neural Circuits and Behaviour

== Rankings ==
In the 2024 QS World University Rankings by Faculty, UCL is ranked 9th in the world (and 2nd in London) for Life Sciences and Medicine. In the 2024 Subject QS World University Rankings UCL is ranked 4th in the world (and 1st in London) for Pharmacy and Pharmacology, and =6th in the world (and 1st in London) for Biological Sciences.

UCL came top for research power in the main panels of ‘medicine, health and life sciences’ and ‘social sciences’ according to the Research Excellence Framework 2021 (REF).

UCL is also ranked 8th in the world for Biological Sciences and 2nd in the world for Pharmacy and Pharmaceutical Sciences in the 2023 Shanghai Rankings.

== Notable alumni and staff ==
There are currently six Nobel Prize winners amongst the Faculty's alumni and current and former staff.

=== Current staff ===
- David Attwell
- Nadia Bukhari
- David Colquhoun
- Stuart Cull-Candy
- Rob Horne
- Steve Jones
- John O'Keefe
- Rosalind Raine
- Geraint Rees
- Claudio Stern
- Seirian Sumner
- Gabriel Waksman
- Semir Zeki
- Ijeoma Uchegbu
- Frances Brodsky
- Susan Evans
- Kate Jones
- Linda Partridge
- Tara Keck
- Christine Orengo
- Matthew Todd
- Annette Dolphin
- Maria Fitzgerald
- Abdul Waseh Basit
- Muki Haklay

=== Alumni/deceased ===
- Dame Georgina Mace
- Rebeccah Slater
- Carla J. Shatz
- Gillian Griffiths
- Mary Collins
- Nigel Bonner
- Andrew Huxley
