= Portuguese Pharmaceutical Industry Association =

Portuguese trade association

The Portuguese Pharmaceutical Industry Association (Associação Portuguesa Da Indústria Farmacêutica) is a trade association based in Lisbon. It was established in 1975, succeeding the National Guild of the Manufacturers of Medicinal Products which was established in 1939.

It represents 114 member organisations as of 2022. Heitor Costa is the Executive Director.

== See also ==
- European Federation of Pharmaceutical Industries and Associations
- International Federation of Pharmaceutical Manufacturers & Associations
- Japan Pharmaceutical Association
- List of pharmacy associations
- Pharmaceutical Association of Israel
- Pharmaceutical Research and Manufacturers of America
