= ASPL =

ASPL can refer to:

- American Society for Pharmacy Law
- An alternate name for ASPSCR1 (derived from "Alveolar soft part sarcoma locus")
