= Gaza war protests in the United Kingdom =

Series of demonstrations since 2023

- Part of the Gaza war protests
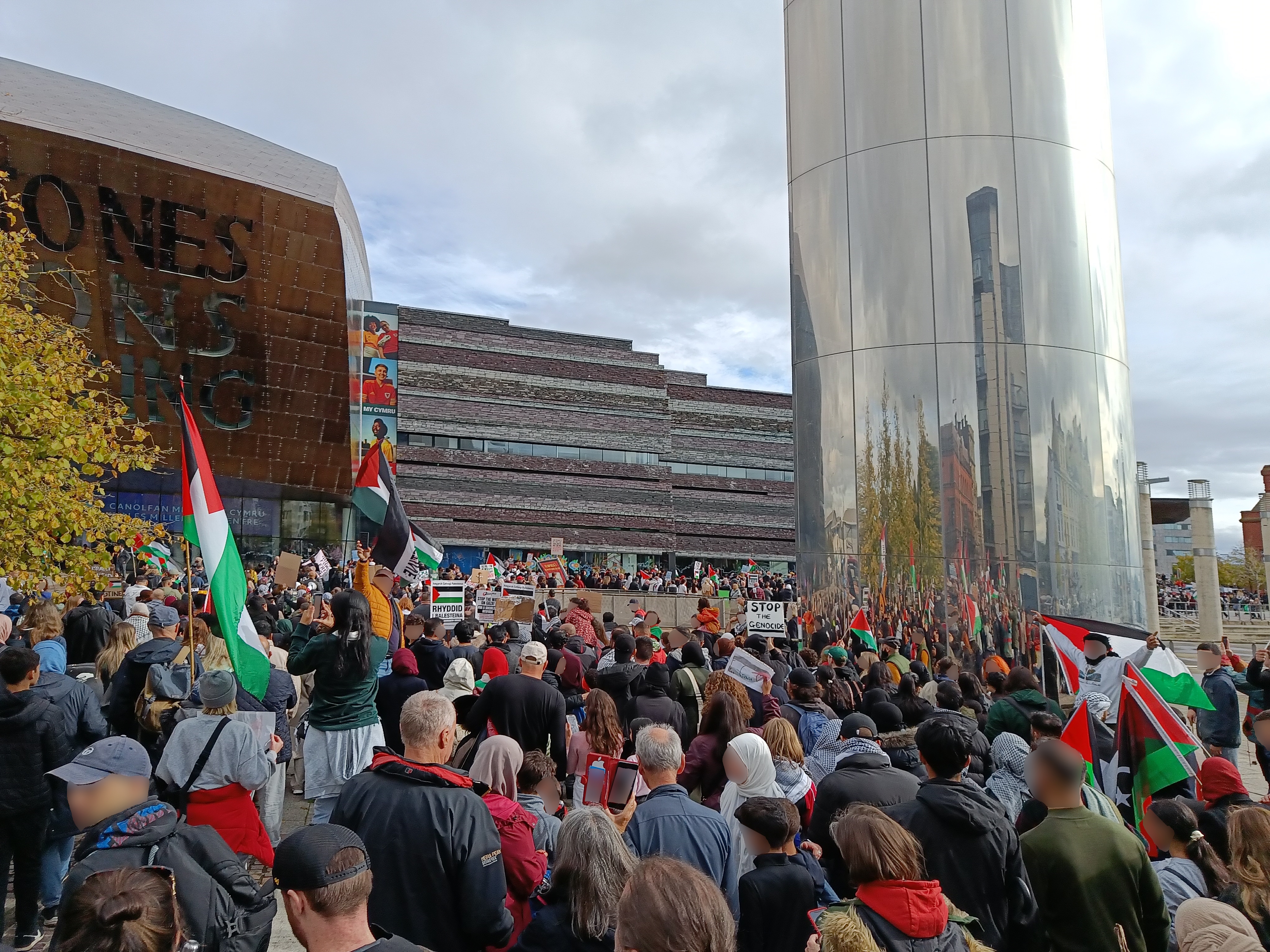
- Solidarity protest in Cardiff, Wales, opposing the bombing of Gaza (21 October 2023)
- Date: 8 October 2023 – present
- Location: United Kingdom
- Caused by: Gaza war
- Goals: Varied
- Methods: Protests, demonstrations, civil disobedience, online activism

As a result of the Gaza war, following the 7 October 2023 Hamas-led attack on Israel, nationwide protests occurred across the UK. These demonstrations occurred as part of a broader movement of Gaza war-related protests occurring around the world.

== Marches, rallies, sit-ins, vigils ==
In the following weeks during Israel's counterattacks on Gaza, a number of pro-Palestine vigils, rallies and marches were held throughout the UK. On 9 October, the Stop the War Coalition and Palestine Solidarity Campaign (PSC) attended a demonstration in which hundreds marched through London's Kensington High Street and outside the embassy of Israel. The largest demonstrations were held in London, with people from across the country in attendance: thousands marched on 14 October 2023, 100,000 on 21 October, 70,000 on 28 October, 30,000 on 4 November and 300,000 on 11 November. The 11 November march was one of the largest in the UK in years, with some estimating it was the largest since the 2003 protest against the invasion of Iraq.

Hundreds of thousands demonstrated in other parts of the country: in Scotland, including in Edinburgh, Glasgow, Dundee, Forres, Dumfries and Aberdeen; in England, including in Leeds, Blackburn, Manchester, Sheffield, Birmingham, Oxford, Swindon, Bristol, Norwich, Brighton, Southampton; in Wales, including in Cardiff, Swansea, Abergavenny and Newport; in Northern Ireland, including in Lurgan, Armagh, Derry, and Belfast, where a protest was held in front of the US consulate; and in the Crown Dependencies of Guernsey, Jersey, and the Isle of Man.

Sit-ins were held at train stations, such as London King's Cross, London Waterloo, Liverpool Lime Street, Manchester Piccadilly, Edinburgh Waverley, Glasgow Central and Bristol Temple Meads. In Bristol, school children demonstrated through a series of school strikes and, in east London, high school students boycotted an assembly attended by Labour MP Wes Streeting over his party's refusal to call for a ceasefire in Palestine. At the Luton Sixth Form College, the student council was suspended for staging a walk-out. Protesters removed the Israeli flag from the roof of Sheffield Town Hall and raised the Palestinian flag; South Yorkshire Police later said this incident was a racially aggravated public order offence and a hate crime. Protesters demonstrated at the Science Museum.

On 26 November 2023, between 50,000 and 60,000 people joined in a march in London to protest against a rise in hate crimes against Jews since the attack by Hamas on Israel on 7 October. On 14 January 2024, approximately 25,000 people attended a rally in support of Israel in Trafalgar Square, calling for the release of the hostages held by Hamas. In September 2024, large crowds of protesters at the Labour conference in Liverpool called for a total arms embargo on Israel.

On 21 September 2024 protesters carried a 500-metre red ribbon through Brighton, representing the red line that Israel had crossed.

On the morning of 29 May 2025, several activists and actors including Steve Coogan, Toby Jones, and Juliet Stevenson gathered at Elizabeth Tower outside of the Palace of Westminster to hold a vigil that lasted more than 18 hours and read out the names of more than 16,000 children that were killed in Gaza. The vigil was organised by Choose Love.

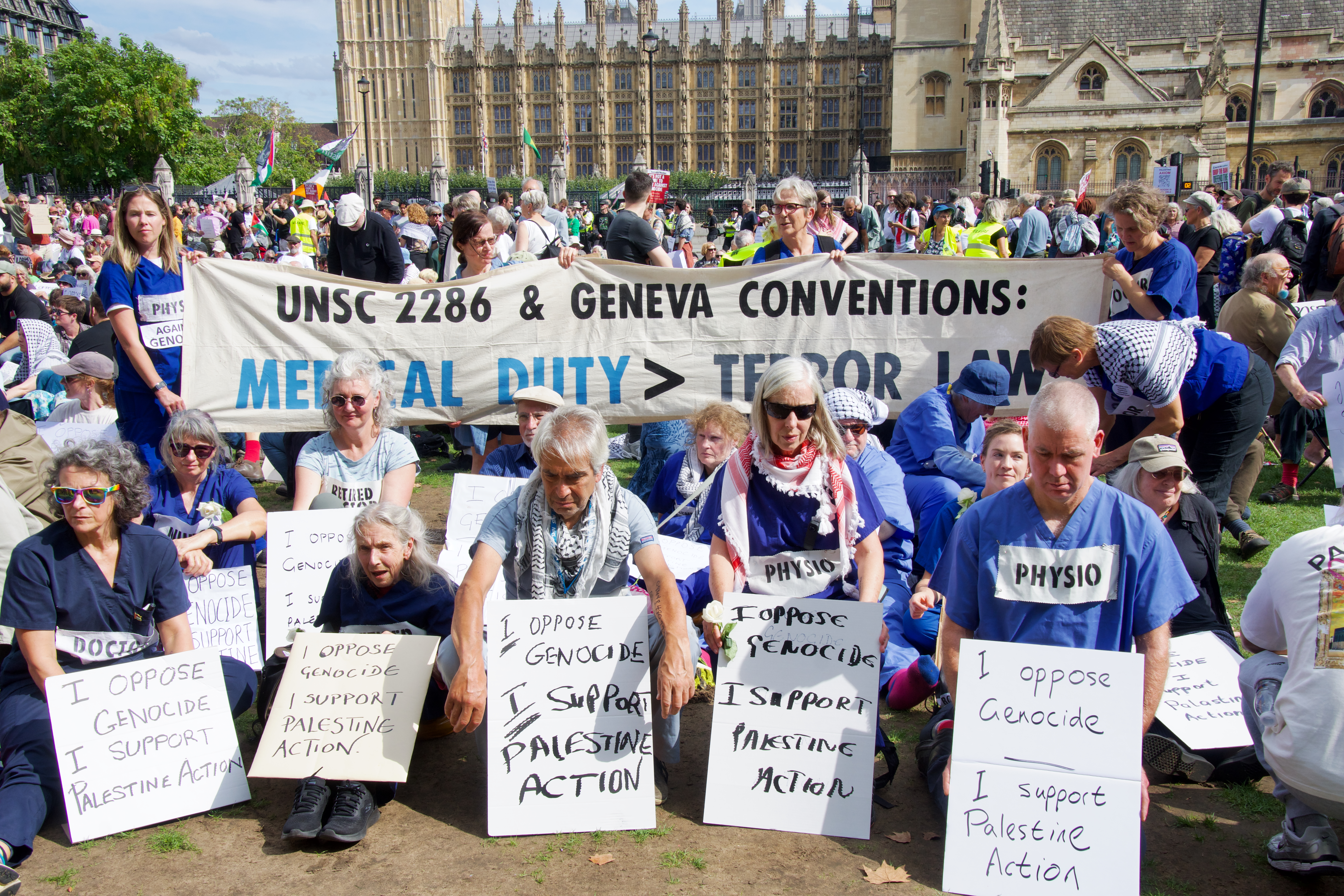
Palestine Action protest in London, 6 September 2025

On 9 August 2025, hundreds of people gathered in Parliament Square to protest against the ongoing genocide in Gaza and in opposition to the banning of Palestine Action, the Metropolitan Police states on X that they have arrested over 446 people in Parliament Square, with campaigners calling it the "largest ever mass arrest at a single protest in the British capital", five officers were injured during the arrests.

On 10 August, about 2,000 people joined a pro-Israel march through central London to show support for Israel and demanding the release of the hostage. The march was led by chief rabbi, Ephraim Mirvis and the Jewish organisation, Stop the Hate.

On 4 October, around 1000 pro-Palestine protesters rallied in London's Trafalgar Square two days after the Manchester synagogue attack took place. A smaller protest of about 100 people occurred near the site of the synagogue in north Manchester. At least 442 protesters were arrested for "supporting the proscribed organization" Palestine Action.

A hunger strike by eight people imprisoned for activity related to Palestine Action began in November 2025, the largest hunger strike in the UK since the 1981 Irish hunger strike. It led to the hospitalisation of several prisoners.

== Petitions ==
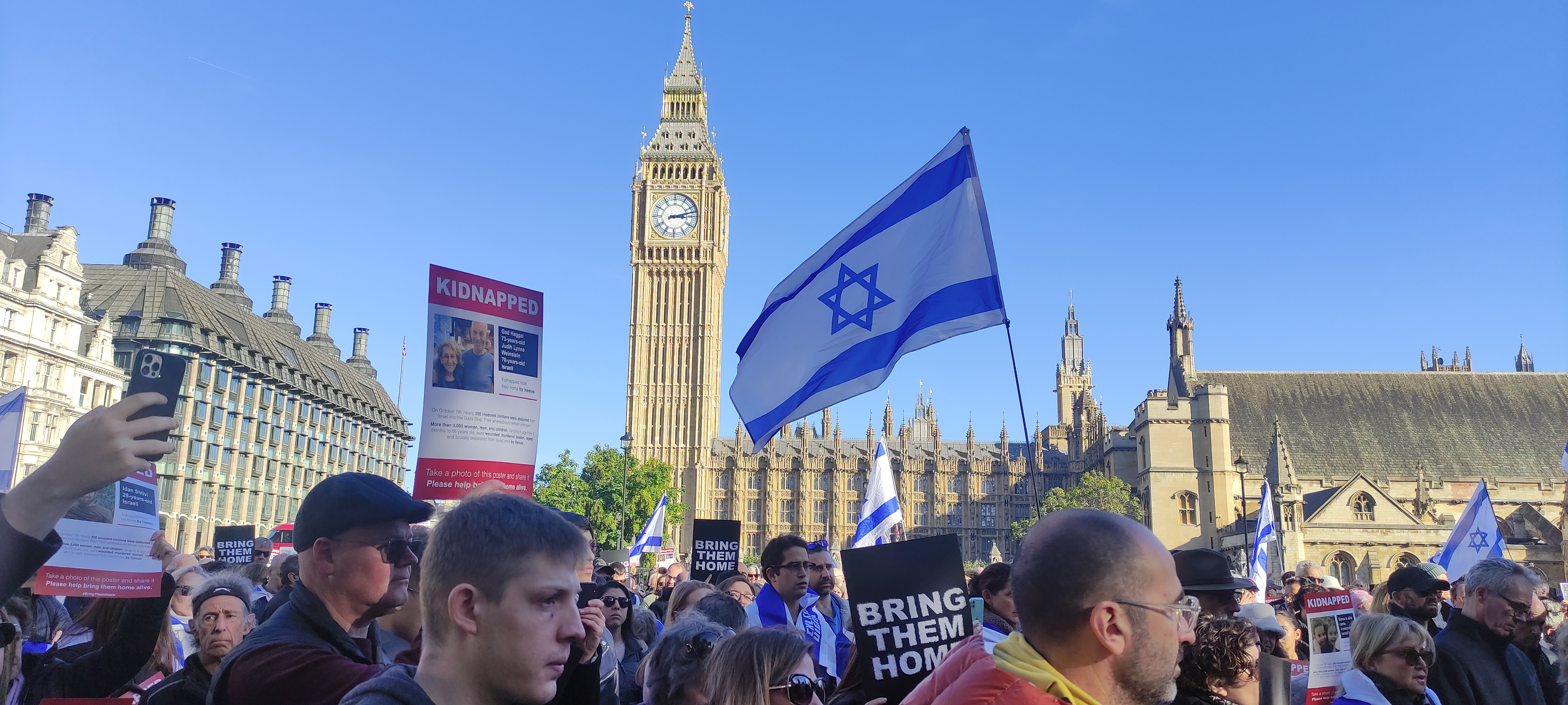
Pro-Israel rally in London, 15 October 2023

Various petitions have been made to politicians and institutions with various aims, including official support of a ceasefire and financial disinvestment from Israel.

In November 2023, a petition signed by hundreds of people was presented Bristol City Council to call for a ceasefire and to light the City Hall in the colours of the flag of Palestine to express sympathy for Palestinians who had been killed or injured by Israel, as it had lit the building in blue and white (the colours of the flag of Israel) following the October 7 attacks. Also in Bristol, the same month, a petition handed to Carla Denyer, councillor for Clifton Down and co-leader of the Green Party of England and Wales, called for a ceasefire. Many of the signatories were children who had participated in protests outside Bristol City Hall, organised by School Strike for Palestine, a collective of local campaigners and parents.

Students, faculty and alumni of the University of Oxford petitioned the university to endorse a ceasefire. The petition garnered nearly 2,000 signatures by November 2023. On 20 October 2023, an open letter was delivered to the University of Cambridge, signed by over 1,400 students and staff. It demanded that the university denounce "inhumane measures imposed on Gaza by Israel", sever all financial ties to the Israeli Government (as it had with Russia following the Russian invasion of Ukraine), protect Palestinian and minority ethnic students from ethno-religious harassment and threats, and call for the preservation of academic freedoms and free speech.

In August 2025, more than 700 business figures signed a letter urging the government to prevent further acts of genocide in Gaza. The letter was created by Business Leaders for Peace.

== Civil society ==
=== Lawyers and legal scholars ===
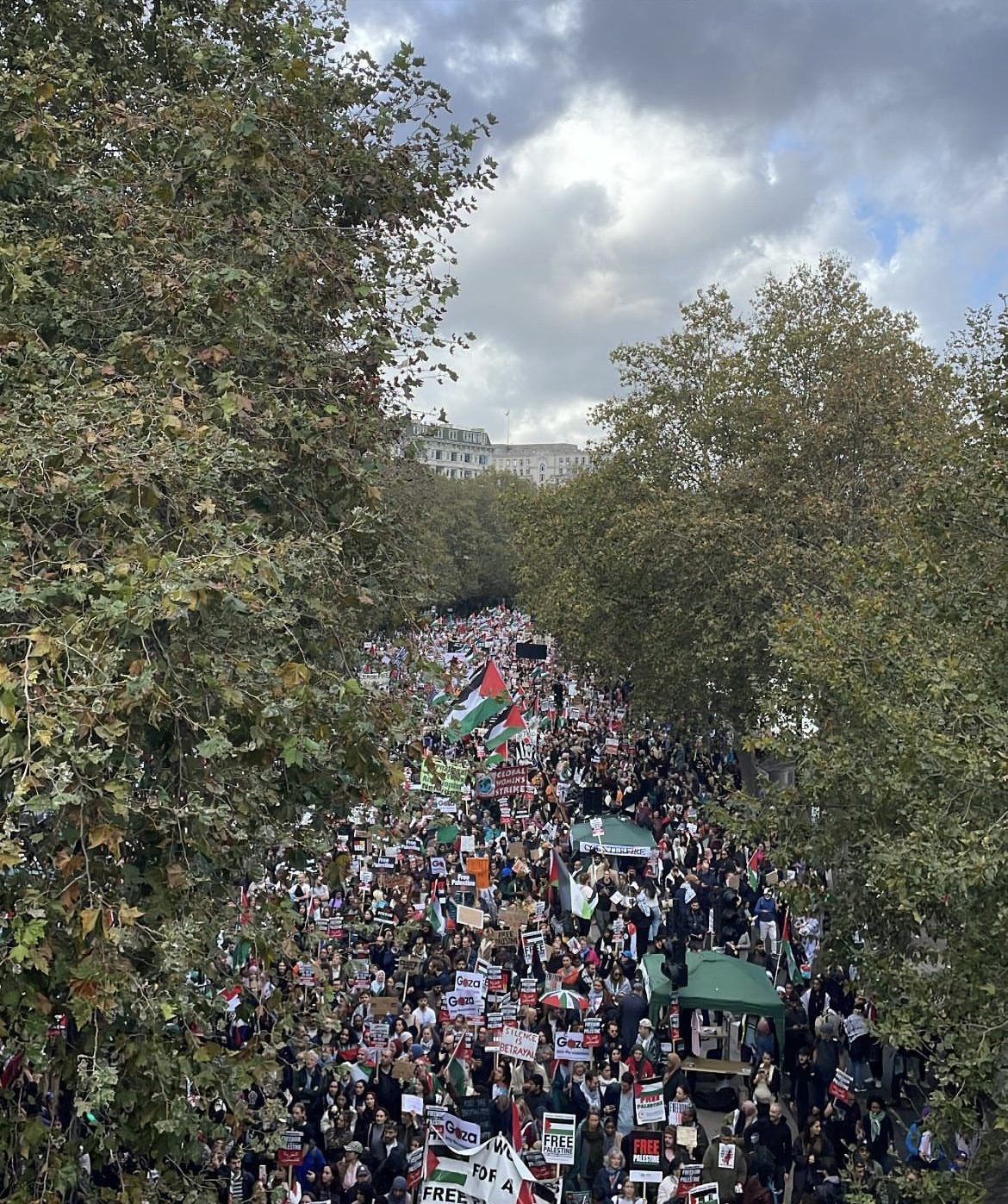
Pro-Palestinian rally in London, 28 October 2023

On 13 and 16 October 2023, lawyers at the International Centre of Justice for Palestinians issued notice to prime minister Rishi Sunak, leader of the opposition Keir Starmer, and Labour politicians Emily Thornberry and David Lammy, outlining their intention to prosecute politicians who might aid and abet war crimes. The notices were issued following statements by Starmer and Thornberry, Shadow Attorney General, that appeared to justify the war crime of collective punishment based on "Israel's right to defend itself". The letters were written by the group's co-chairs, Conservative MP Crispin Blunt and lawyer Tayab Ali, a partner at Bindman law firm.

Eight prominent British Jewish lawyers – Lord David Neuberger, Philippe Sands KC, Richard Hermer KC, Danny Friedman KC, Anthony Metzer KC, Jon Turner KC, Adam Wagner and Sandra Fredman — wrote a letter, dated 17 October, to the Financial Times expressing "significant concerns" over Israel's conduct in Gaza, noting that "[i]t would be a grave violation of international law to hold them [that is, the two million residents of Gaza] under siege and whilst doing so deprive them of basic necessities such as food and water", that "collective punishment is prohibited by the laws of war", and that it was not "insensitive or inappropriate" to remind Israel of its obligations. The same day, 39 legal scholars from British universities, including Phil Scraton, Professor Emeritus at Queen's University Belfast's School of Law, wrote to Keir Starmer asking him to clarify Labour's position on war crimes – particularly collective punishment – in light of Starmer's statement on LBC Radio that Israel had the right to cut off water and electricity to Gaza.

Two days before, British scholars of law, conflict studies, and Holocaust and genocide studies, including Alison Phipps, UNESCO chair at the University of Glasgow, Nadine El-Enany, Professor of Law at the University of Kent, and Damien Short, professor of human rights at the School of Advanced Study, had been among signatories of a statement, published on the Third World Approaches to International Law Review website, stating they felt "compelled to sound the alarm about the possibility of the crime of genocide being perpetrated by Israeli forces against Palestinians in the Gaza Strip".

Later that month hundreds of lawyers signed an open letter, dated 26 October 2023, to the British government expressing concern over breaches of international law by Israel, calling for it to press for a ceasefire and stop arms sales to Israel. Signatories included Geoffrey Bindman KC, a solicitor specialising in human rights law, Andrew Hall KC, former chair of the Criminal Bar Association, and Theodore Huckle KC, former Counsel General for Wales, along with partners and directors of law firms and professors of law. In November 2024, an Israeli academic, Haim Bresheeth, was arrested in London for alleged hate speech after giving a speech at a pro-Palestinian rally.

=== Charities and NGOs ===
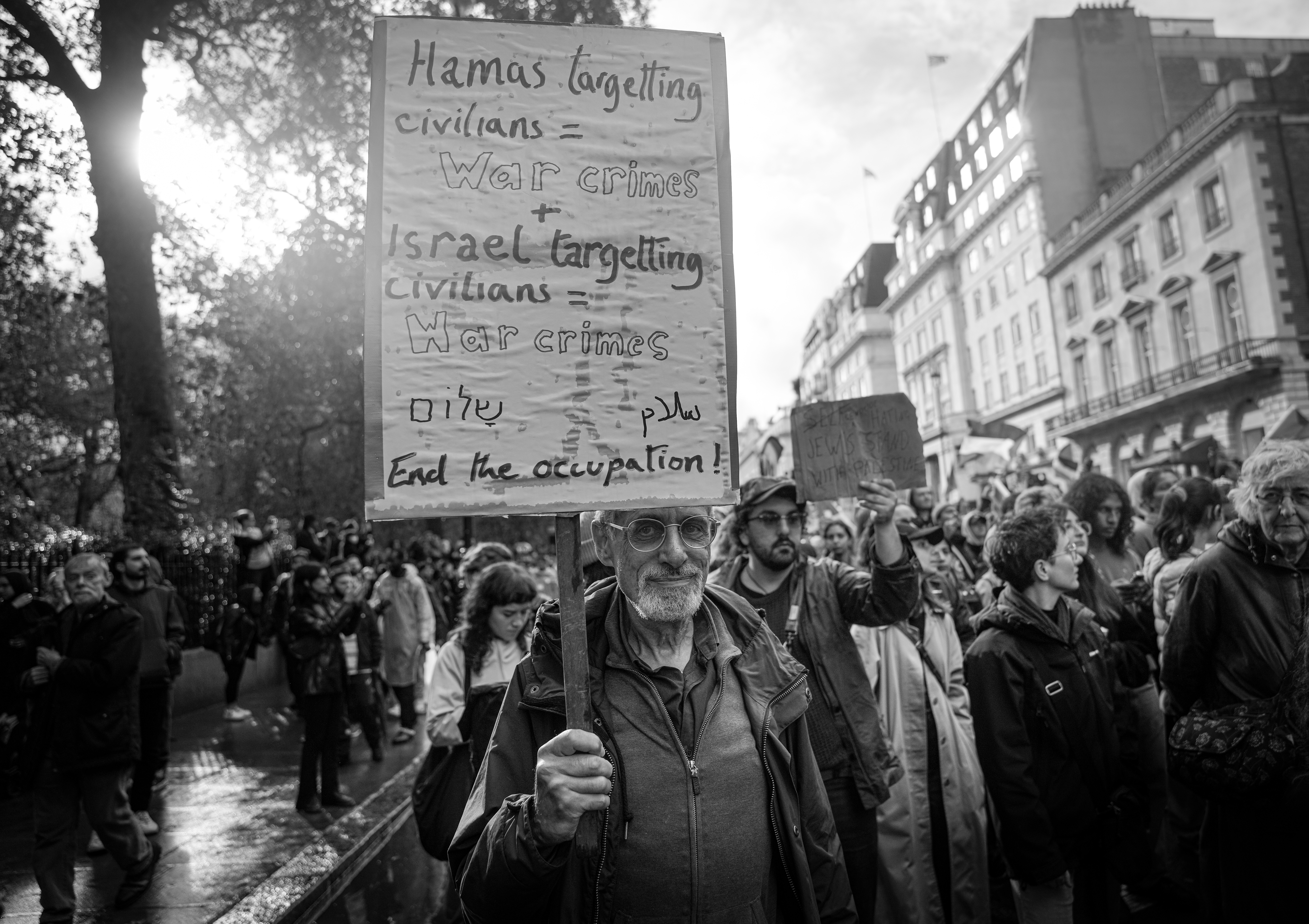
Pro-Palestinian rally in London, 21 October 2023

British charities and NGOs join in calls for a ceasefire and for humanitarian aid to be provided in Palestine. Ahead of the Global Food Security Summit in London, the heads of 12 charities wrote to the Prime Minister, urging him to use his opening remarks at the summbit to "call for an immediate ceasefire, condemn Israel's ongoing siege and insist that food, fuel, water and other aid vital for survival is allowed into Gaza with immediate effect". The charities included Oxfam, War Child, Christian Aid, Medical Aid for Palestinians, Islamic Relief, CAFOD, Council for Arab-British Understanding, Humanity & Inclusion, Plan International and Action Against Hunger. Medical Aid for Palestinians organised a protest outside the Foreign, Commonwealth and Development Office in Lancaster House, where a Global Food Security Summit was being held, attended by the prime minister Rishi Sunak, Minister of State for Development and Africa Andrew Mitchell and newly appointed foreign secretary David Cameron. Protestors held signs saying, "Feed Gaza, Ceasefire Now", highlighting the food and water insecurity experienced by people in Gaza due to Israel's siege and bombardment.

Save the Children and Islamic Relief, who had teams in Israel and Palestine, called for a ceasefire because people in the region, including their staff, were terrified, and so that aid could be provided. Amnesty International said the government's and Labour's refusal to condemn Israel diminished the gravity of the war crimes committed by the state. The charity called on British politicians to "explicitly oppose all war crimes" committed by Palestinians and Israel.

The Refugee Council, Safe Passage International, Doctors of the World, the Helen Bamber Foundation, City of Sanctuary and other NGOs raised concerns about the crisis, particularly for Palestinian refugees, and drew up a plan for the resettlement of Palestinian and Israeli refugees modelled on the government's initiative for Ukrainians following Russia's invasion of Ukraine. Financial Secretary to the Treasury Victoria Atkins said a Palestinian refugee scheme was "not the right response because we need to keep the pressure on this terrorist organisation to stop their hostilities, to release hostages and to come back to the diplomatic negotiating table. At this stage, I'm not sure that another humanitarian route is the answer".

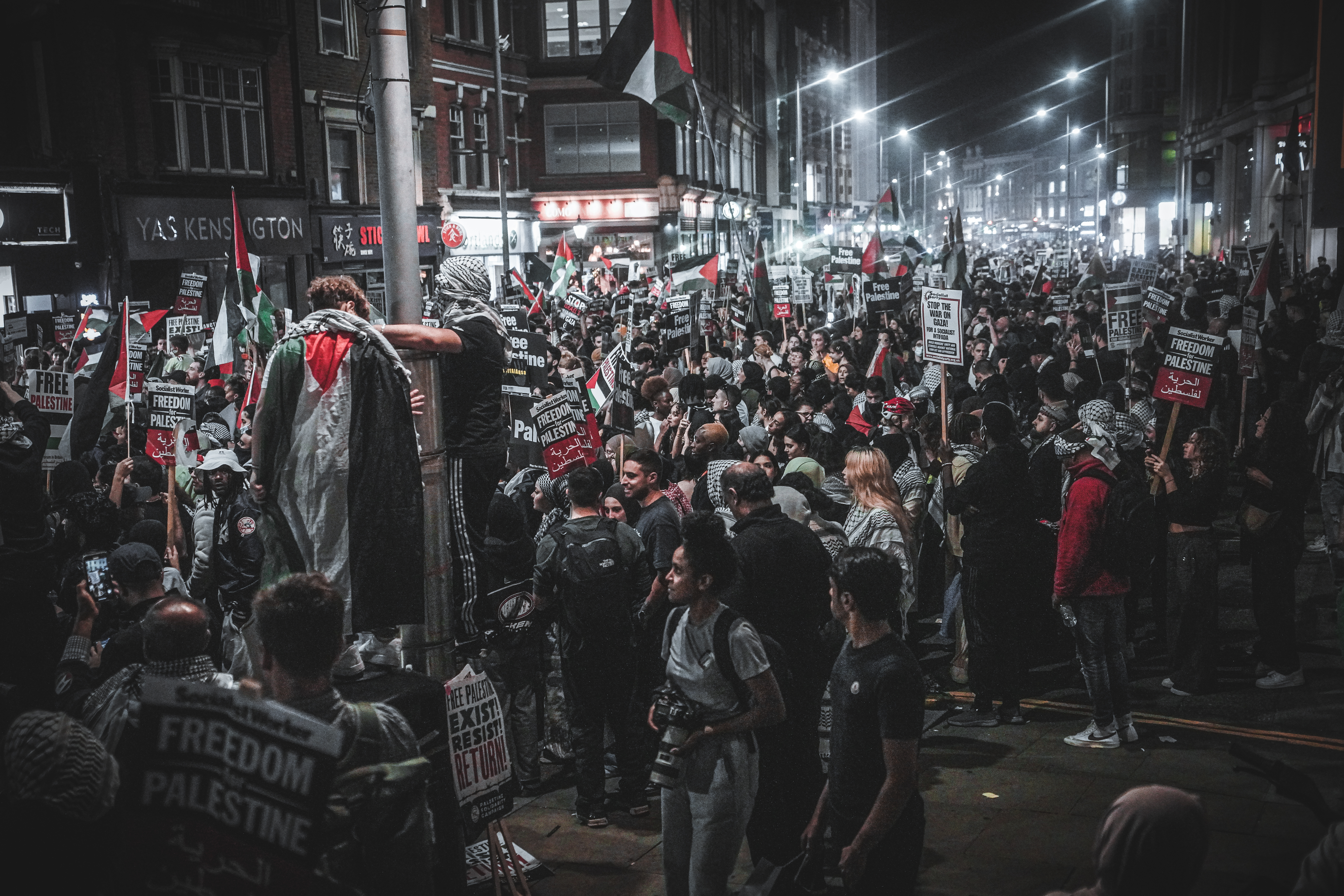
Pro-Palestinian protest in London, 8 October 2023

Following the explosion at the Al-Ahli Arab Hospital in Gaza, 70 international NGOs, including ActionAid UK, Bond, CAFOD, Christian Aid, Islamic Relief, Médecins Sans Frontières UK, Oxfam, Save the Children UK, WaterAid UK and Tearfund, released a statement urging the British government to secure a ceasefire. Amnesty International held a protest outside 10 Downing Street in solidarity with Palestinians in Rafah ahead of Israel's expected Rafah offensive.

Following the start of Israel's Rafah offensive, Oxfam called on the U.K. to cease arms transfers to Israel, stating, "The UK government will be complicit in this carnage as long as it continues to sell arms to Israel, in the knowledge that they are likely being used to kill and maim Gaza’s population."

=== Health care workers ===
The Royal College of Nursing released a statement condemning "atrocities" against civilians and health care workers in Israel and Gaza, and demanding health care workers be able to care for the sick and injured without the threat of violence because health care is a human right. Minority ethnic health care staff from 27 associations of nurses, midwives, doctors and other health care workers, wrote an open letter to the government asking the prime minister to call for a ceasefire. The letter, organised by the British Islamic Medical Association, also urged the prime minister to "take the lead" on facilitating a peaceful solution to the crisis. To commemorate the nearly 200 health care workers killed by Israel's bombardment of Gaza, health care workers gathered outside Downing Street to demand a ceasefire. The health care workers held signs with the names of each their 189 colleagues killed in Gaza. Thousands of doctors signed an open letter to the government condemning its support for Israel as a "flagrant disregard of international law violations and healthcare crises".

== Trade unions ==
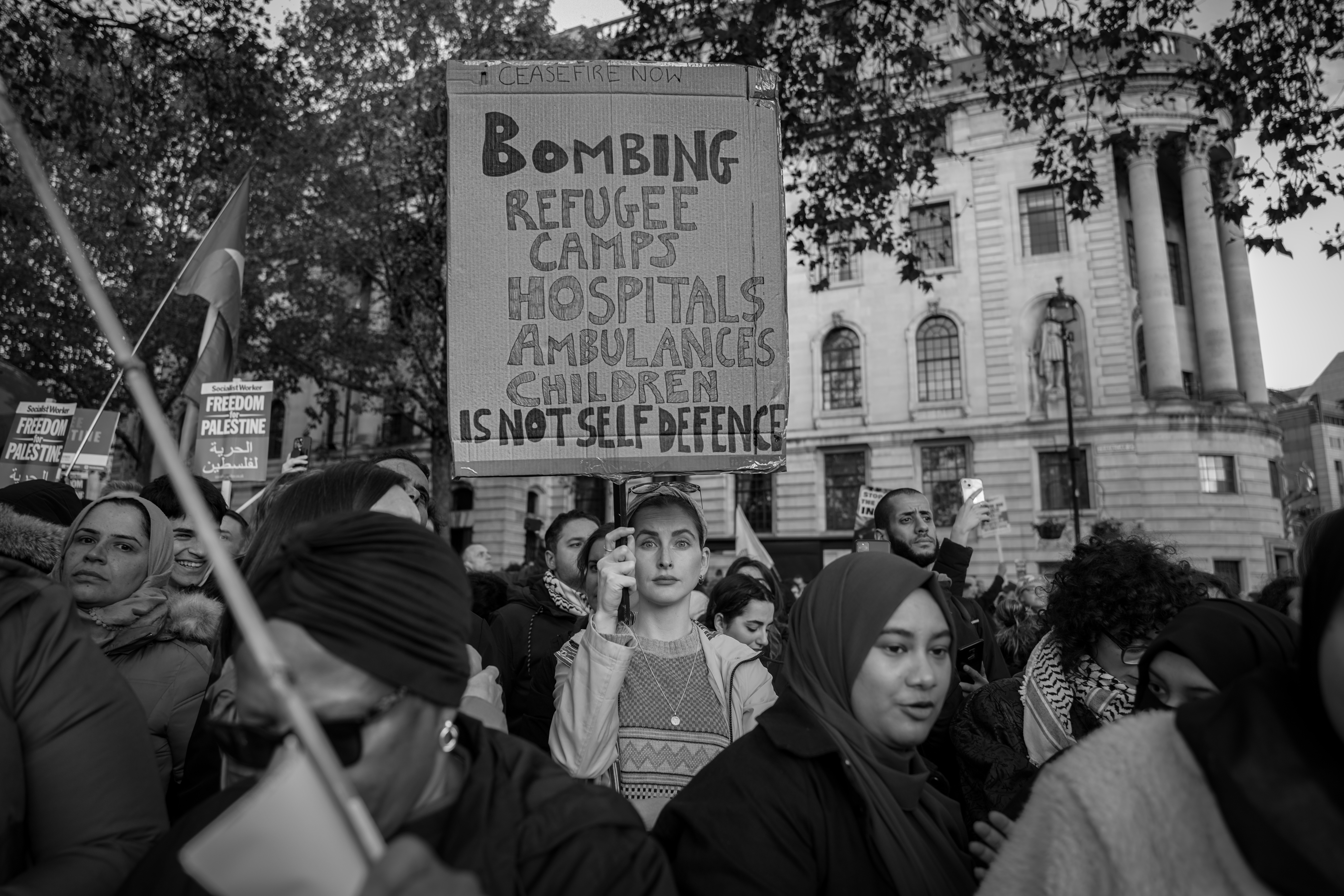
Pro-Palestinian protest in London calling for a ceasefire, 4 November 2023

A number of trade unions released statements condemning the attacks by both Hamas and Israel and calling for a ceasefire, including the RMT, FBU and the two largest UK trade unions, Unite and Unison, with Unison making donations to Medical Aid for Palestinians and the Red Cross. The Trades Union Congress (TUC) said the "killing of Israeli civilians by Hamas and the collective punishment of the people of Gaza by the Israeli government will do nothing to end the occupation or bring about peace". Further, the TUC spoke against the Israeli government's order for Palestinians to leave northern Gaza, saying it "risks a humanitarian disaster". Equity echoed both these sentiments, adding that the Israeli government's orders and actions – including the withholding of utilities from Gaza – could only lead to ethnic cleansing. The GMB said "[i]nnocent civilians must never be punished for the actions of terrorist groups" and repeated its "support for an independent Palestinian state" within a "two-state solution". The Royal College of Nursing (RNC) condemned "abhorrent, inhumane atrocities committed against civilians and ... health care workers" in Israel and Gaza and called health care a human right, with RCN Chief Nurse Professor Nicola Ranger adding, "Under the Geneva Conventions the killing of civilians is prohibited and the sick and wounded must be cared for. Nursing staff must be able to work without fear of violence".

The NASUWT joined calls for a ceasefire and a "just peace in Israel and Palestine, an end to the military occupation of Palestinian territory, and respect for all Palestinian rights including the right to self-determination" — sentiments expressed similarly by the General Federation of Trade Unions (GFTU), which also voiced that the "current escalation in violence takes place in the context of the illegal occupation of Palestinian territory by Israel and a systematic oppression of the Palestinian people, described by international human rights organisations as a system of "apartheid"". United Voices of the World warned against the possibility of the genocide of Palestinians, as did IWGB, which "condemn[ed] the violence that has been enabled and encouraged by Western governments, including the UK government". Some trade union statements, such as IWGB's and the GFTU's, expressly referenced and supported Palestinian trade unions' calls for (in the GFTU's words) the "trade union movement worldwide to refuse to build or transport weapons to Israel, to take action against companies complicit in the siege of Gaza and to pressure their governments to cease military trade with Israel".

== Protests at universities ==
As of February and March, similar protests and calls for divestment had already been occurring at Goldsmiths, University of London, the University of Leeds, and the University of Bristol. On 22 April, students from the University of Leicester Palestine Society held a protest. On 26 April, a rally was held by students of University College London (UCL) on campus, though they had been campaigning for months. UCL Action for Palestine won a meeting with senior members of university's management, also on 26 April, to discuss divestment and propose aiding Palestinian students whose universities had been destroyed. After a campaign from students, the University of York announced on 27 April it "no longer holds investments in companies that primarily make or sell weapons and defence-related products or services".

In the early morning of 26 April, students from the University of Warwick occupied the campus piazza; the encampment later moved to outside Warwick's Senate House before disbanding voluntarily on 26 June. On 1 May, encampments were established at the University of Bristol, the University of Leeds (closed by 19 June under threat of legal action), the University of Manchester (closed 17 June), and Newcastle University, as well as a joint one between the University of Sheffield and Sheffield Hallam University. On 3 May, protesters set up an encampment at University College, London. Protesters also occupied the library at Goldsmiths, University of London. Goldsmiths agreed to the protester's demands, naming a building after Palestinian journalist Shireen Abu Akleh, review the University's policy regarding the IHRA working definition of antisemitism, and to erect an installation on campus memorializing the protest.

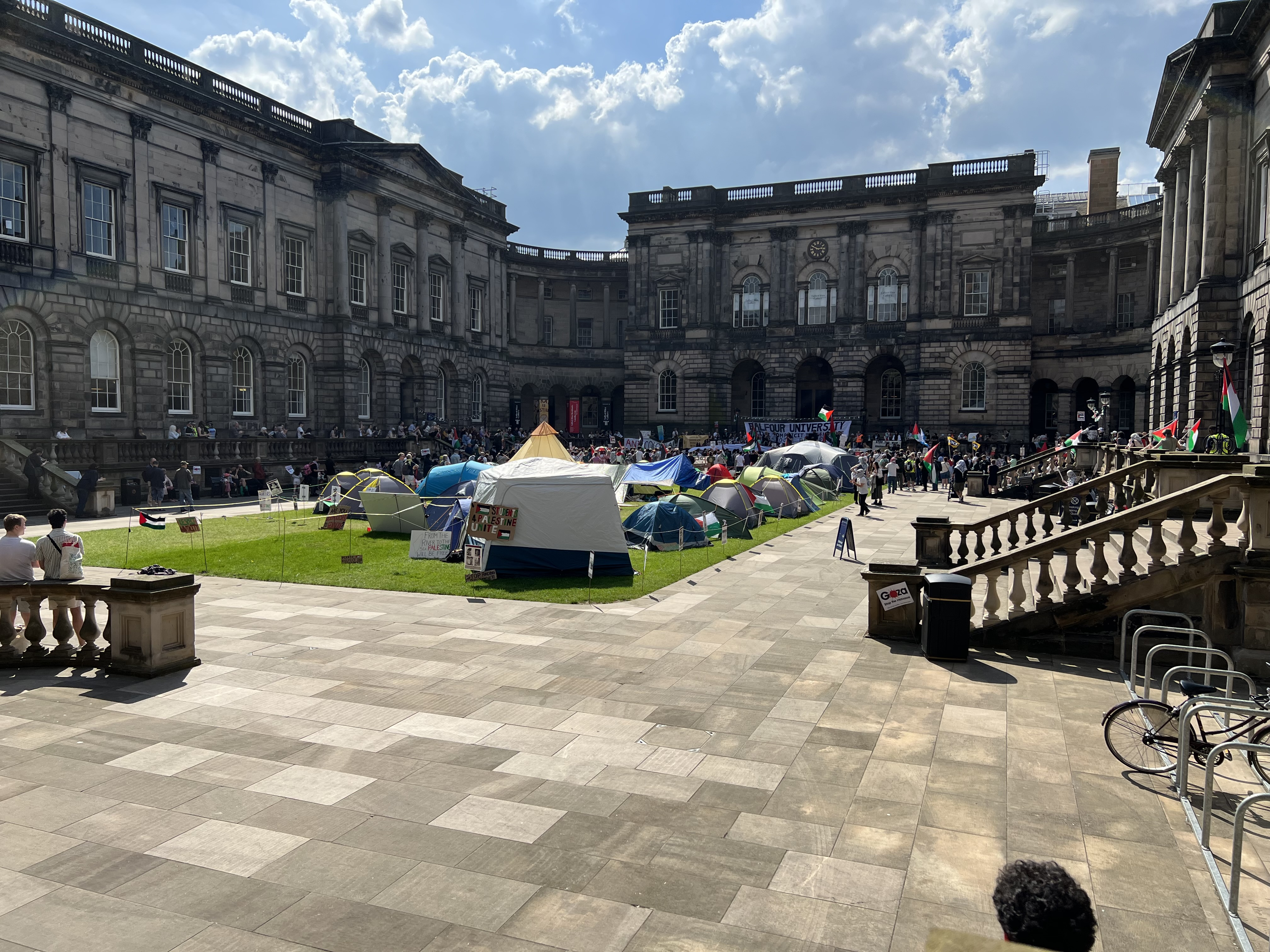
Edinburgh University student Gaza protest, Old College Quad encampment, May 2024.

The following week, protesters set up encampments the University of Oxford, University of Cambridge, School of Oriental and African Studies, and University of Liverpool on 6 May with an encampment at Swansea University having been established at some point before this (voluntarily disbanded early June citing "significant wins" including divestment from Barclays Bank).

In Scotland, encampments were also established at Aberdeen University and the University of Edinburgh. On 7 May, protesters at Queen's University Belfast staged a sit-in in support of Palestine. Among other demands, protesters called for Hillary Clinton to be removed as the university's chancellor. Later in the year on 14 November, four protesters were arrested at Queen's University and Clinton, who was speaking, was evacuated. On 8 May, Abercromby Square at the University of Liverpool was occupied and unofficially renamed after the murdered Gazan poet Refaat Alareer. An encampment was set up at Bangor University on the same day. On 9 May, protesters set up encampments at Lancaster University and at the Green Heart at the University of Birmingham, with a second encampment at Birmingham being established shortly afterwards at the Chancellor's Court (closed following a court order on 14 June). On 10 May, encampments were set up at Durham University (voluntarily disbanded 21 June) and the University of Nottingham.

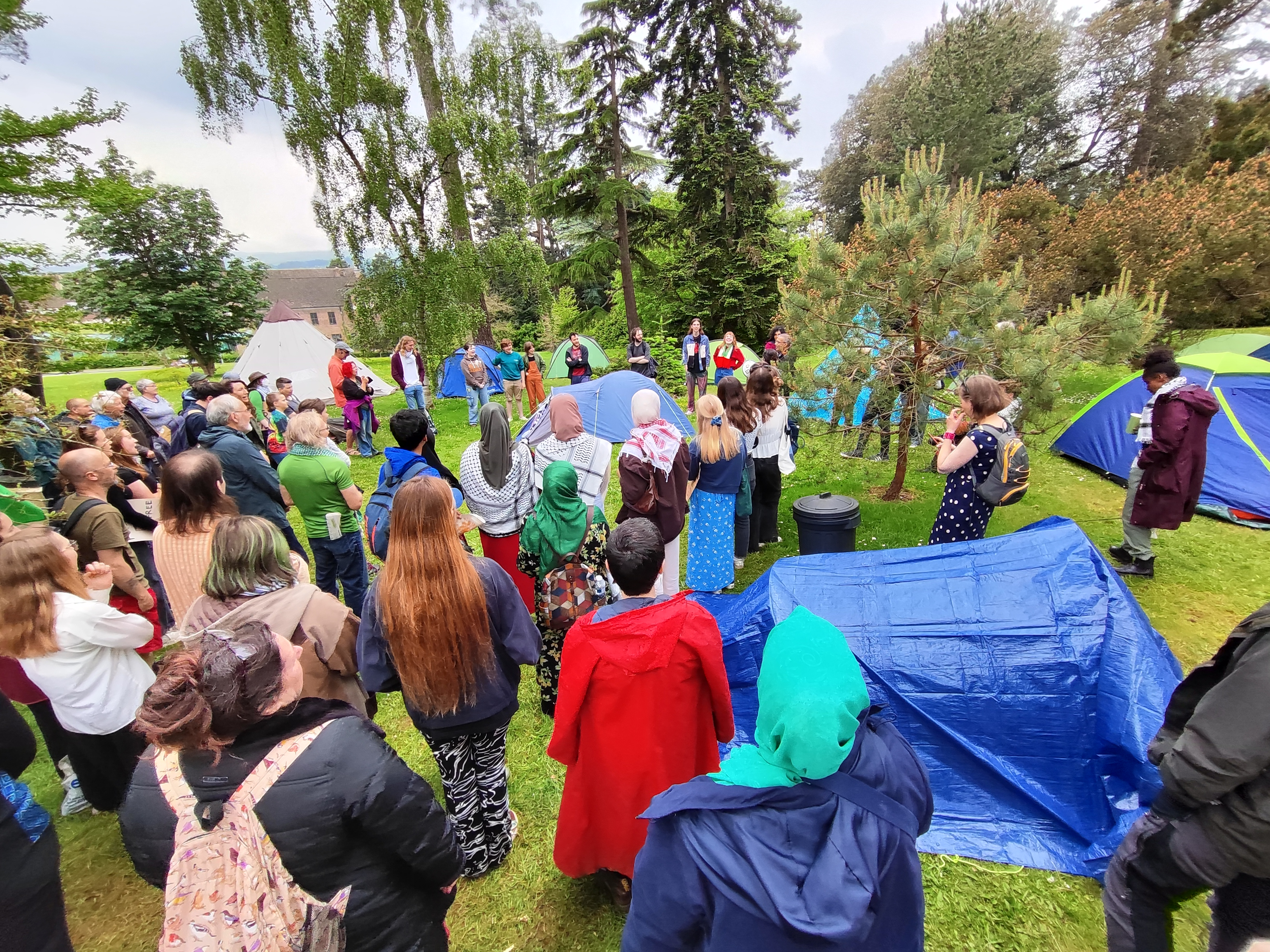
Encampment at the University of Exeter, 18 May 2024

On 13 May, protesters set up an encampment at the University of Sussex's Library Square, and students held a rally followed by the establishment of an encampment at Queen Mary University of London. The next day, hundreds of pro-Palestinian protesters began occupying Marshall Hall at London School of Economics. The organizers came to an agreement with the security team that students with ID would be allowed access to the building. About 50 demonstrators remained, stating that they intended to occupy the building until their demands were met. Following a court order on 14 June, they were evicted from the building on 17 June. Also on 14 May, encampments were also set up at Cardiff University, University of Lincoln, and students from the University of Exeter set up the "Exeter Liberation Encampment for Palestine" on the Streatham campus. The latter follows the setting up of the "FalExe Solidarity Encampent" jointly by students of Exeter and Falmouth University on the Penryn Campus. On 15 May, an encampment was set up in front of Heslington Hall at the University of York.

On 20 May, an encampment was set up at the University of Reading. On 23 May, sixteen protesters were arrested at Cambridge University for aggravated trespass, as well as one arrest on suspicion of common assault, after an occupation of the universities' office buildings. The university accused protesters of "threatening and violent actions". On 27 May, protesters at Aberystwyth University began a weeklong sit-in at the university's library, and in the evening, protesters at the University of Manchester barricaded themselves inside Whitworth Hall, disrupting exams that were due to take place in the building. An encampment was also set up at Imperial College London (voluntarily disbanded 20 June).

In November, pro-Palestine protesters at Ulster University's Belfast campus booed Prince William as he arrived on campus.

In May 2025, around a hundred pro-Palestine demonstrators gathered outside of Trinity College, Cambridge to protest against the college's alleged complicity in the Gaza war, holding up signs like “Trinity College funds genocide” and “Gaza has been held hostage for 107 years.”

=== University of Oxford ===
The pro-Palestinian campus occupations at the University of Oxford (Note: Also known as the Oxford Liberated Zone or Oxford Gaza Solidarity Encampment) were occupation protests in Oxford, England, organised by Oxford Action for Palestine (OA4P). The occupations started on 6 May 2024 on the Museum of Natural History's lawn, in front of the Pitt Rivers Museum. Escalating the protests, a second encampment was established on 19 May outside the Radcliffe Camera.

Protests took place elsewhere in the city, including on Wellington Square, where 17 students were arrested after occupying the Vice-Chancellor's office on 23 May. Protesters' demands included disclosure of investments and divestment from Israeli companies, among others. The university refused to negotiate with protesters until responding to an email to arrange discussion on 5 June. The protests were reportedly supported by over 500 members of staff, and criticised by the university as intimidating.

== Protests directed at companies ==
Direct action was taken at arms factories that supplied arms to Israel. For instance, on 24 October, trade unionists in Kent, from such unions as Unite, Unison, the NEU, UCU, the BMA and BFAWU, blockaded Instro Precision, a subsidiary of Israeli military drone manufacturer Elbit Systems; on 31 October, Palestine Action blocked the entrance to an Elbit Systems factory in the Aztec West business park in Bristol; on 10 November, trade unionists in Rochester, Kent, again blocked the entrances to an arms factory – this time, BAE Systems — stating the facility manufactured military aircraft components used to bomb Gaza; and on 16 November, Palestine Action occupied a Leonardo factory in Southampton, stopping production. On 7 December, four arms factories across the UK were blockaded by protesters opposing military action in the Gaza Strip.

Protests also targeted companies other than arms manufacturers viewed as supporting Israel. Calls were made to boycott brands such as Starbucks, McDonald's and Puma. Campaigners in Derry persuaded the city's Home Bargains store to remove from its shelves products manufactured in Israel, and persuaded O'Neills to remove Puma products because of the sports brand's sponsoring of the Israeli Football Association. A protest was held outside a McDonald's in Bristol, mice were released in McDonald's restaurants in Birmingham, and stick insects in one in Keighley, West Yorkshire, after a franchise in Israel donated free food to Israeli soldiers. McDonald's responded that they did not support or fund any governments involved in the conflict and the actions of the franchise were taken without involvement, consent or approval of the corporation. Also in Keighley, a Starbucks was targeted, with protesters smashing the shop's windows, following the corporation's decision to sue the Starbuck Workers United union after the labour organisation posted on social media support for Palestine.

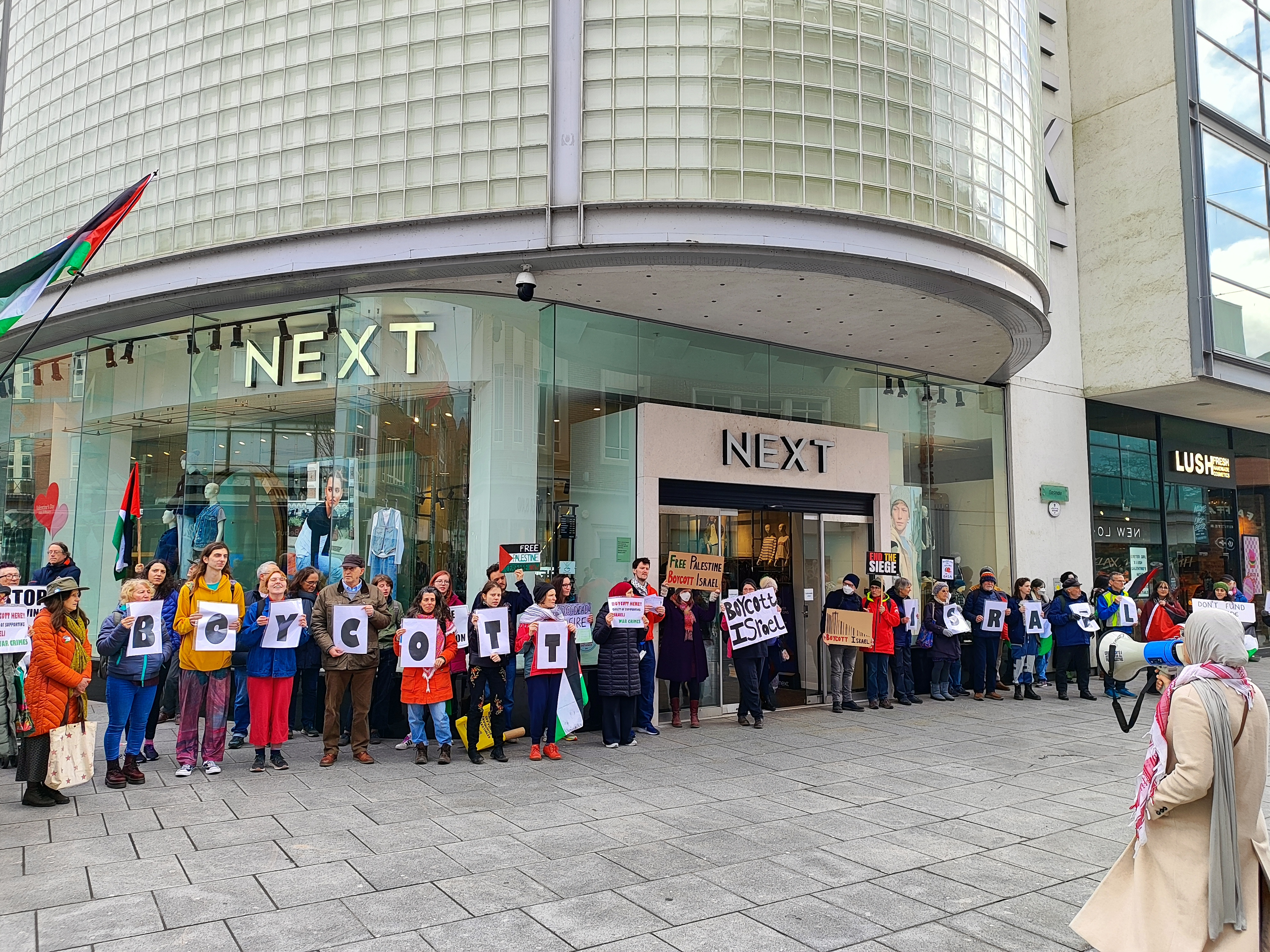
Pro-Palestinian protest outside Next in Exeter, 10 February 2024

Students organised protests directed at their universities, often demanding the institutions sever financial and research ties with companies that sold weapon technology to Israel. A protest in Cambridge with an attendance of over a thousand students and residents – the city's largest demonstration – called on the University of Cambridge to divest from Israel. Students also wrote to the university demanding it investigate its financial ties with arms manufacturers that potentially supplied to Israel, mentioning, among others, Plasan and Caterpillar. Students and staff also walked out of lectures in protest over the same issues. University of Sheffield students interrupted the opening ceremony of the university's newest building, in support of Palestine and in protest over the university's financial contracts with arms manufacturers, including BAE Systems, GKN, Boeing. Palestine Action spray painted the London building of Leonardo in protest of its manufacturing of weapons used by Israel.

In May 2024, over 100 music acts decided to boycott The Great Escape Festival in Brighton and Hove, in protest against the event's sponsor Barclays and its investments in companies supplying arms that were reportedly used by Israeli military forces in their invasion of the Gaza Strip. English group Massive Attack, who had previously boycotted gigs in Israel in opposition to the Israeli–Palestinian conflict, expressed their support to the artists and bands who walked out of the festival. The following month, several artists gave up their sets at the Latitude Festival in Suffolk, also in protests to the event's partnership with Barclays. In May 2025, over 50 artists including Brian Eno and Robert Del Naja of Massive Attack signed a letter urging Field Day cut ties with KKR. The letter states that due to its acquisition by KKR "the festival is now implicated in the crimes against humanity of apartheid and genocide."

On 26 August 2025, four pro-Palestinian protesters entered Moog Inc.'s Wolverhampton facility and occupied the roof of a building. The protesters said that they had targeted the facility because of Moog's production of components for military aircraft used by Israel. The "Moog 4" were charged with criminal damage and were remanded in custody for six months before being released on bail. In September and October 2025, Moog also obtained a High Court injunction restricting protest activity at several of its United Kingdom facilities.

On 21 September 2026, nine protesters blocked access to an Elbit Systems factory in Staffordshire. The protest aimed to disrupt Elbit's operations because it supplies military equipment to Israel. According to police, the protesters were arrested.

== Politicians' positions ==
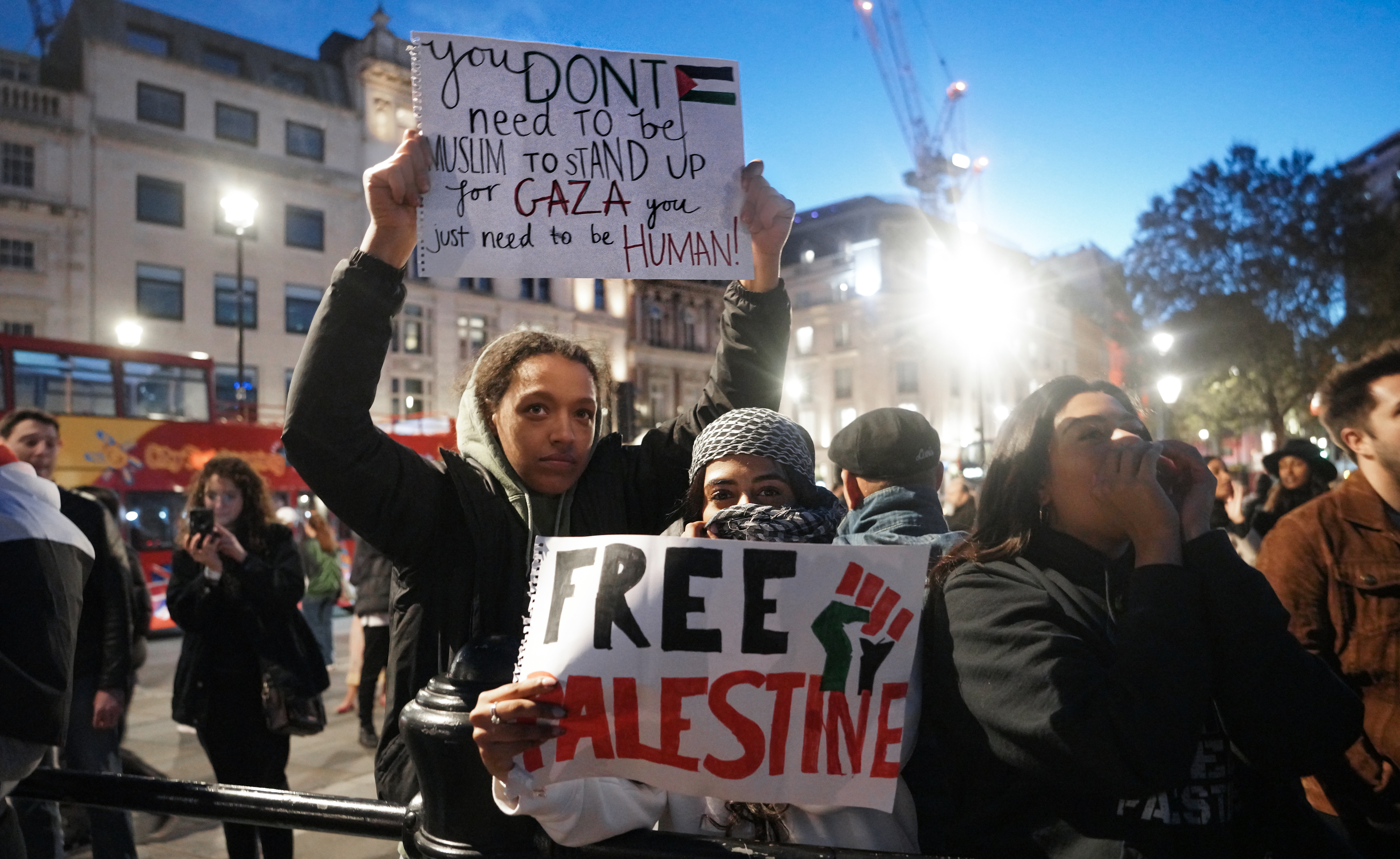
Pro-Palestinian rally in London, 14 October 2023

The official position of both the UK's main political parties, the Conservatives and Labour, were supportive of Israel. Labour leader Keir Starmer supported Israel cutting off Gaza's water and power supply. Labour issued a warning to its MPs and council leaders that their politicians should not attend pro-Palestine rallies. Hundreds of Labour councillors wrote to Starmer urging him to call for a ceasefire, and dozens resigned from the party because they could not in conscience retain membership due to its position.

Conservative MP Paul Bristow wrote to then-Prime Minister Rishi Sunak asking him to call for a ceasefire – an act for which his party sacked him from his government role as ministerial aide. Labour MP Imran Hussain resigned from his shadow minister role because he could not advocate for a ceasefire while in the position. Labour MP Apsana Begum visited a Palestine Solidarity Campaign stall, posing for a picture, at the Labour Party Conference in Liverpool. The leaders of Greater Manchester's 10 metropolitan district councils (all but one of which were led by Labour), the mayor of Greater Manchester, Andy Burnham, and Deputy Mayor of Greater Manchester for Policing and Crime Kate Green, released a statement calling for a ceasefire. MP Andy McDonald spoke at a pro-Palestine rally; following the rally, Labour fired him because he had said "from the river to the sea".

Under pressure from party members to back a ceasefire, Starmer adapted the official Labour position to one critical of Israeli military bombardment but falling short of calling for a ceasefire. The Scottish National Party tabled a parliamentary motion calling for a ceasefire, saying in an official release, "It's time to call a spade a spade. To any neutral observer, war crimes are being committed by Israel in Gaza." No Conservative MPs voted for the motion and Labour said its MPs should abstain and, instead, vote on Labour's own motion calling for "humanitarian pauses" to the fighting. However, a number of its MPs, including frontbenchers, defied the order and voted for the ceasefire motion. Ten frontbenchers resigned from their position because they did not agree with the party line.

In July 2025, more than 200 lawmakers from various political parties including the Labour Party, Conservative Party, and Liberal Democrats called on the government to recognise Palestine as a state.

=== Protests directed at politicians ===
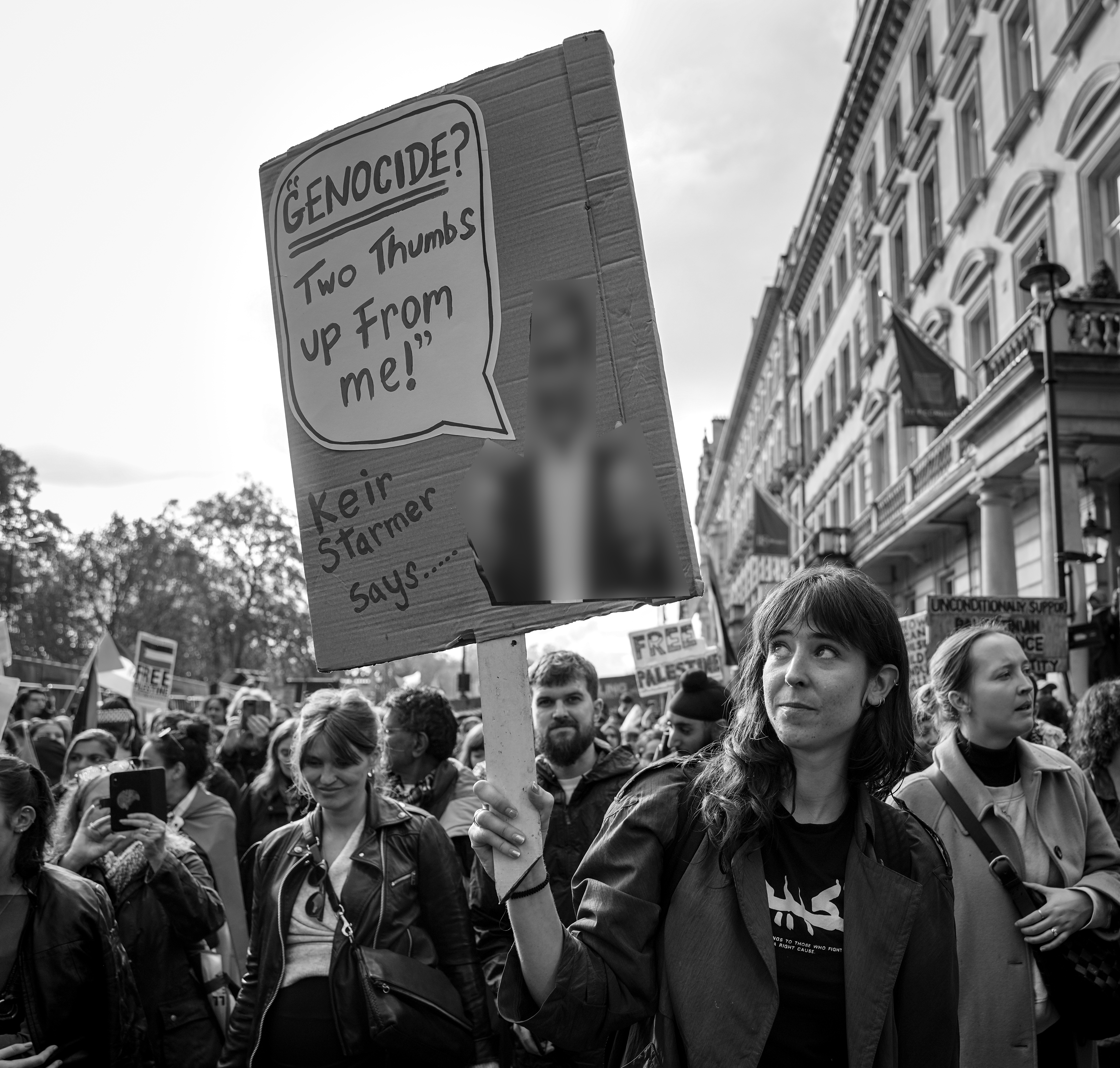
Protestor holding a sign saying Keir Starmer allegedly supports the genocide of Palestinians during the Gaza war

Pro-Palestine protesters expressed their disagreement and disarpoval of political parties' and politicians' positions on Israel's actions towards Palestinians. Protestors chanted "Shame on you" at Conservative MP Michael Gove, then-Secretary of State for Levelling Up, Housing and Communities and Minister for Intergovernmental Relations, as he was ushered through London Victoria shortly after a sit-in at the station. Protesters interrupted Yvette Cooper's speech, holding up "Ceasefire now" signs, during the King's Speech debate in the House of Commons as she spoke about the crisis in Israel. Protesters demonstrated outside Labour's London headquarters, chanting "Keir Starmer, you can't hide, you're endorsing genocide" and calling for the party to "change their policy ... and to demand an immediate ceasefire".

Following a parliamentary vote on a ceasefire, from which the majority of Labour MPs abstained, MPs' constituency offices were targeted. Jo Stevens, one of the abstaining MPs, had the word "Murderer" graffitied on her Cardiff Central office, and stickers and posters were stuck up saying the MP had "blood ... on her hands" and supported the killing of babies. Protesters demonstrated outside the office of Peter Kyle, Labour MP for Hove, who also abstained on the vote for a ceasefire. The protesters left a list of demands at the MP's office, including that the MP denounce Israel's "illegal use of excessive force", call for an immediate ceasefire and demand a stop to arms exports to Israel. Steve McCabe's Birmingham Selly Oak office was another outside which protesters gathered, this time calling for the MP's deselection. Hundreds of people marched through Labour leader Keir Starmer's constituency and protested outside his office, critical of his handling of the crisis. 100,000 signed a petition to expel Tzipi Hotovely. Protesters interrupted an event held by Angela Rayner, with one woman telling Rayner, "You call yourself a modern-day feminist, I don’t think so." In January 2024, the speech of Labour's Shadow Foreign Secretary David Lammy was interrupted by pro-Palestinian protesters. In March 2024, a group of women protesting outside parliament shaved their heads in solidarity with the women of Gaza.

Amnesty International put up mock signs reading "Genocide Avenue" on the street outside the Israeli embassy in London. In April 2024, protestors rallied outside the Oxford Union which was hosting Nancy Pelosi; Pelosi's speech was reportedly drowned out by the sound of the protestors before being disrupted by two members of the audience with Palestinian flags who were later removed by police. On 15 November 2024, students at University College London (UCL) protested the visit of Czech Foreign Minister Jan Lipavský, criticising the Czech government's support for Israel.

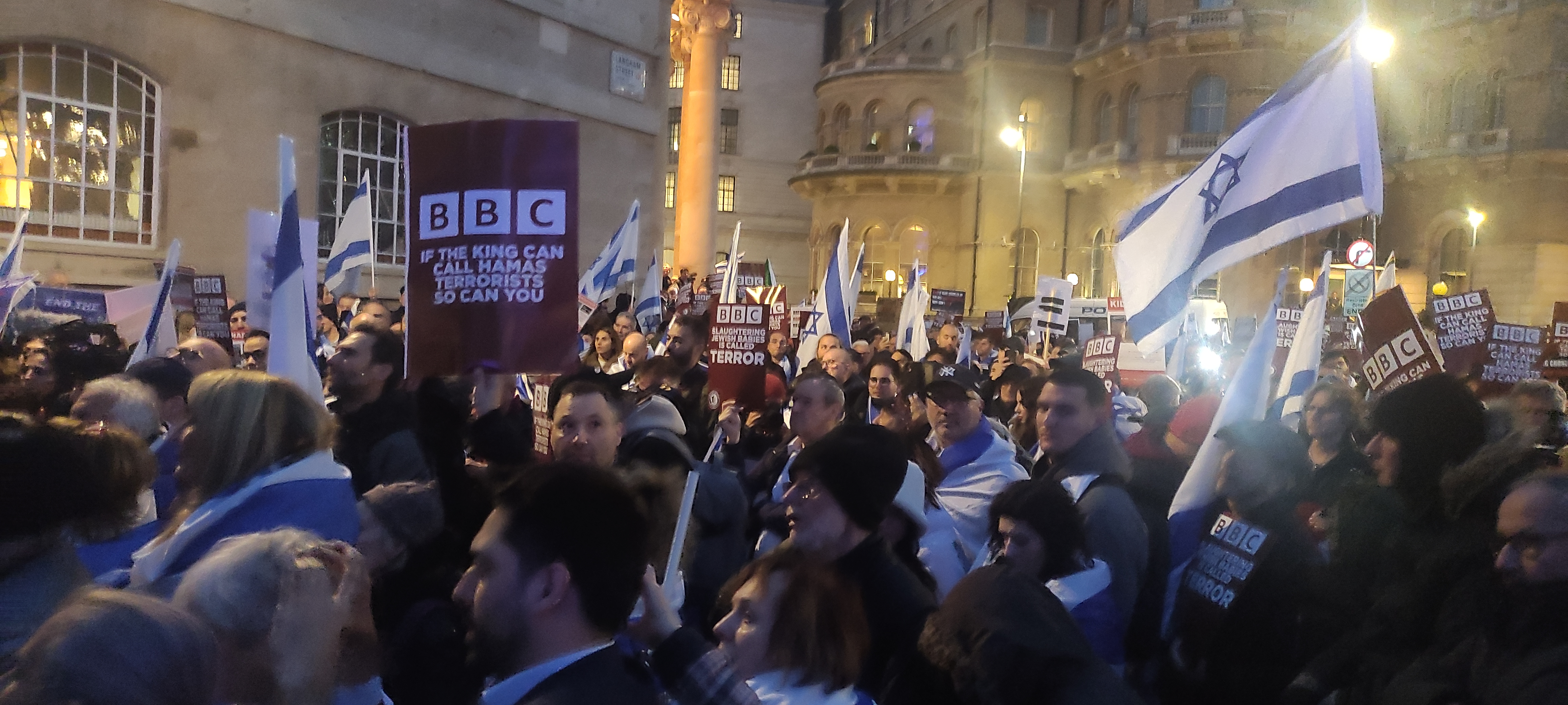
Protests organised by Jewish groups in front of Broadcasting House, following the outbreak of the Israel–Hamas war and the BBC's initial refusal to describe Hamas as a terrorist organisation.

== Cultural figures ==
Within the first few weeks of the crisis, three separate open letters calling for a ceasefire were signed by British cultural figures – artists, authors, historians, actors, directors, musicians, and so on, such as Tilda Swinton, Charles Dance, Nihal Arthanayake, Felix Weatherall, Alex Sushon, Michael Winterbottom, Josie Long, Mike Leigh, Asif Kapadia, Anthony Anaxagorou, Steve Coogan, Reni Eddo-Lodge, Gary Younge, Sally Rooney — along with their international counterparts. One of the letters, from DJs, producers, collectives and venues part of the UK electronic music scene, had nearly 300 signatories; another, published in the London Review of Books, had 750; and the third, from members of Artists for Palestine, had more than 2,000.

In February 2024, fashion designer Katharine Hamnett threw her CBE award into the garbage in front of television cameras, saying: “I’m disgusted to be British for our role in genocide in Gaza.”

On 25 August 2025, screenwriter Paul Laverty was arrested under the UK's Terrorism Act 2000 for “showing support for a proscribed organisation” during a Free Palestine protest in Edinburgh. According to reports, the reason for the arrest was wearing a T-shirt that said “Genocide in Palestine, time to take Action” that allegedly supported the banned organization Palestine Action.

In September 2025, British musician Brian Eno organized a fundraiser event called Together for Palestine at Wembley Arena, with dozens of musicians, actors, activists and speakers, including joined and performed at the event to raise money to Palestinians. Notable celebrities, speakers and musicians included Benedict Cumberbatch, Florence Pugh, Bastille, Saint Levant, Mehdi Hasan, and Francesca Albanese. The event successfully raised £1.5 million. In addition, the event also posted a video online featuring dozens of other celebrities including Billie Eilish, Cillian Murphy, Brian Cox, and Joaquin Phoenix showing support and solidarity with event.

== Religious organisations ==
The Catholic Agency for Overseas Development (CAFOD) called for a ceasefire and an end to the "humanitarian catastrophe", a spokesperson saying, a "humanitarian pause does not go far enough. Only a ceasefire can put an end to the killing of civilians, ensure hostages are freed and allow enough aid to meet the huge humanitarian need". After Palestinian Christians had written to Archbishop of Canterbury Justin Welby expressing concern about the Anglican leaders' "support for the UK's stance on the Israel-Hamas war", Welby join calls for a ceasefire, saying "the suffering of innocent Palestinians cries out as a great wrong and, as I have said before: the evils of Hamas cannot be paid by the civilians of Gaza".

Members of Pax Christi, a Catholic peace movement, joined the Armistice Day march in London. The Catholic Bishops' Conference of England and Wales issue a statement calling on the UK government to increase efforts for a humanitarian ceasefire in Gaza and the immediate release of all hostages; and Church of England's House of Bishops called for "immediate humanitarian pauses" while "holding out hope for a ceasefire in the longer term", adding that "all parties to this conflict" should "adhere to international humanitarian law and ... take all necessary steps to minimise harm to civilians and civilian infrastructure". Similarly to England's House of Bishops, the bishops of the Church in Wales called for "a pause in the attacks" for aid to be delivered and, condemning Hamas's attacks, also urged Israel to recognise that "peace in the Middle East cannot be established on the foundations of retribution, violence, and innocent suffering, however provoked".

== Responses ==
=== Anti-Palestinianism and Islamophobia ===
Since the start of the Israel–Hamas war, Islamophobic hate crimes increased by 140% in London. Hate monitoring group Tell MAMA recorded 4,971 incidents of anti-Muslim hate across the UK between 7 October 2023 and 30 September 2024, which is the highest recorded in 14 years and an increase of 800–1,000% since 2012. Several Muslim experts have accused politicians of not doing enough to challenge Islamophobia in the UK. Iman Atta, the director of Tell MAMA, said many politicians "do not even speak about it". According to British journalists Peter Oborne and Imran Mulla, "Britain has experienced an epidemic of almost unchallenged anti-Palestinian racism and anti-Muslim bigotry" since the war began, which has often targeted pro-Palestinian activists and protests. They say politicians and public figures have labelled pro-Palestine marches, chants and placards "antisemitic", including the Palestinian flag itself, while remaining "inexcusably silent" on anti-Palestinianism and Islamophobia. For example, then-Home Secretary Suella Braverman accused the Metropolitan Police of being biased towards pro-Palestinian protesters.

Cambridge University professor James Orr has described Manchester protesters with Palestinian flags as "morally abhorrent". The use of the pro-Palestine chant "From the river to the sea" at protests has also been described as antisemitic and pro-Hamas by politicians, the media, and pro-Israeli groups. Palestinians and scholars have objected to this, describing the chant as expressing a desire for Palestinian self-determination or full equal rights, whether in Israel, Palestine, or both. Political analyst Yousef Munayyer has described the phrase as "a rejoinder to the fragmentation of Palestinian land and people by Israeli occupation and discrimination", and denies that this implies ethnic cleansing of Jewish people or the erasure of Israel. He argues to claim it does is itself Islamophobic. Law scholar Nimer Sultany says the controversy around the chant is designed to "prevent solidarity in the West with the Palestinians".

In Manchester, when the arts venue HOME cancelled Voices of Resilience: A Celebration of Gazan Writing, an event organised by Comma Press, nearly 100 artists withdrew their work from exhibition at the venue. Over 300 artists and arts professionals, including Phil Collins and Maxine Peake, signed an open letter asking HOME to allow the event to continue and to "repair its commitment to anti-racism, including anti-Palestinian racism". The venue reinstated the event as a result of these protests. In July 2024, over 750 artists signed an open letter by Artists for Palestine UK, after the Royal Academy of Arts removed two artworks, including a photograph of a Jewish protestor holding a placard in support of Palestine, from its Young Artists’ Summer Show. The open letter said the Royal Academy had supported "the erasure of [the] Jewish contribution to solidarity with Palestinians". In another letter in September 2024, over 270 artists signed an open letter by Artists for Palestine alleging the Royal Exchange Theatre had censored pro-Palestinian and pro-trans sentiments when it cancelled Stef O'Driscoll's production of A Midsummer Night’s Dream.

=== Antisemitism ===
In the weeks following Hamas' attack against Israel on 8 October 2023, rates of antisemitic hate incidents more than quadrupled across the UK, and by more than 1,350% in London, leading to British police forces deploying hundreds more police officers to protect Jewish communities.

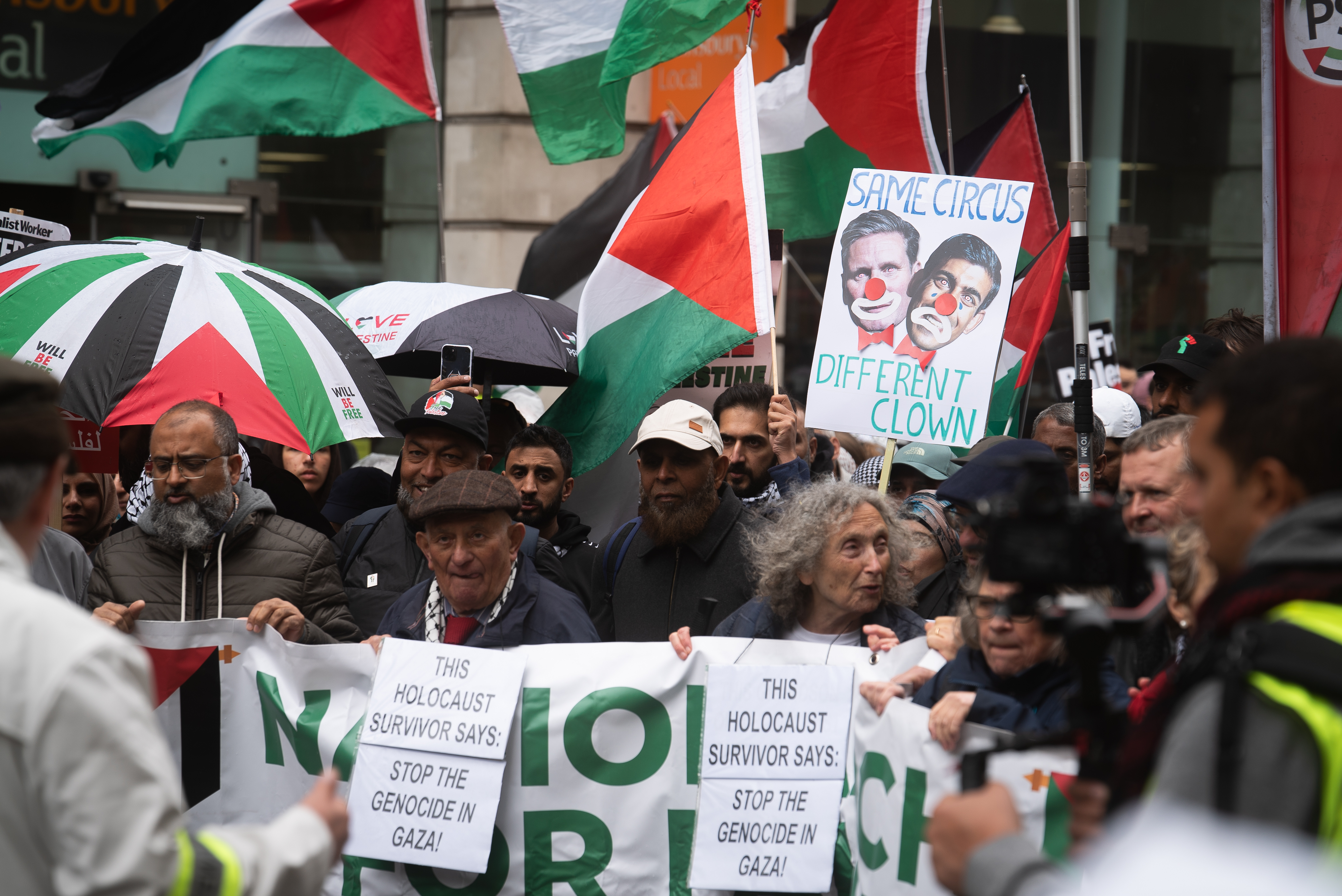
Pro-Palestinian protest in London on 6 July 2024. Among the protesters is Holocaust survivor Stephen Kapos.

People supporting Palestine faced allegations of antisemitism during their protests, while there was a climate of apprehension among Jewish groups. Home secretary Suella Braverman characterised pro-Palestinian demonstrations as "hate marches". Protesters stressed that being pro-Palestinian did not make someone antisemitic, Reasons people gave for protesting included calling for a ceasefire; for an end to the bombing of, and "the massacre" in, Gaza and an end to the killing of Palestinian children; for a "free Palestine [and an] end [to] Israeli occupation"; for countries to "stop arming Israel"; and an end of the "genocide" of Palestinians.

Chants of "From the river to the sea, Palestine will be free" have been heard at a number of pro-Palestinian marches. The Anti-Defamation League considers it to be an antisemitic slogan which "has the effect of making members of the Jewish and pro-Israel community feel unsafe and ostracized." Palestinian scholars have denied this, suggesting such claims aim to "mischaracterize and destroy inclusive and unifying rhetorical frameworks", stifle pro-Palestinian protest, and are inherently Islamophobic and racist. They say the chant is a call for equal rights for all peoples in the region. British NGO Campaign Against Antisemitism has claimed that placards seen at pro-Palestine protests contain "slogans and imagery that would not have looked out of place in Nazi Germany." They claim chants of "Khaybar, Khaybar, ya yahud, jaish al Mohammed sauf yaud" were heard at marches, antisemitic call referencing an ancient massacre and translated as, "Khaybar, Khaybar, oh Jews, the army of Muhammad will return".

=== Armistice Day march ===
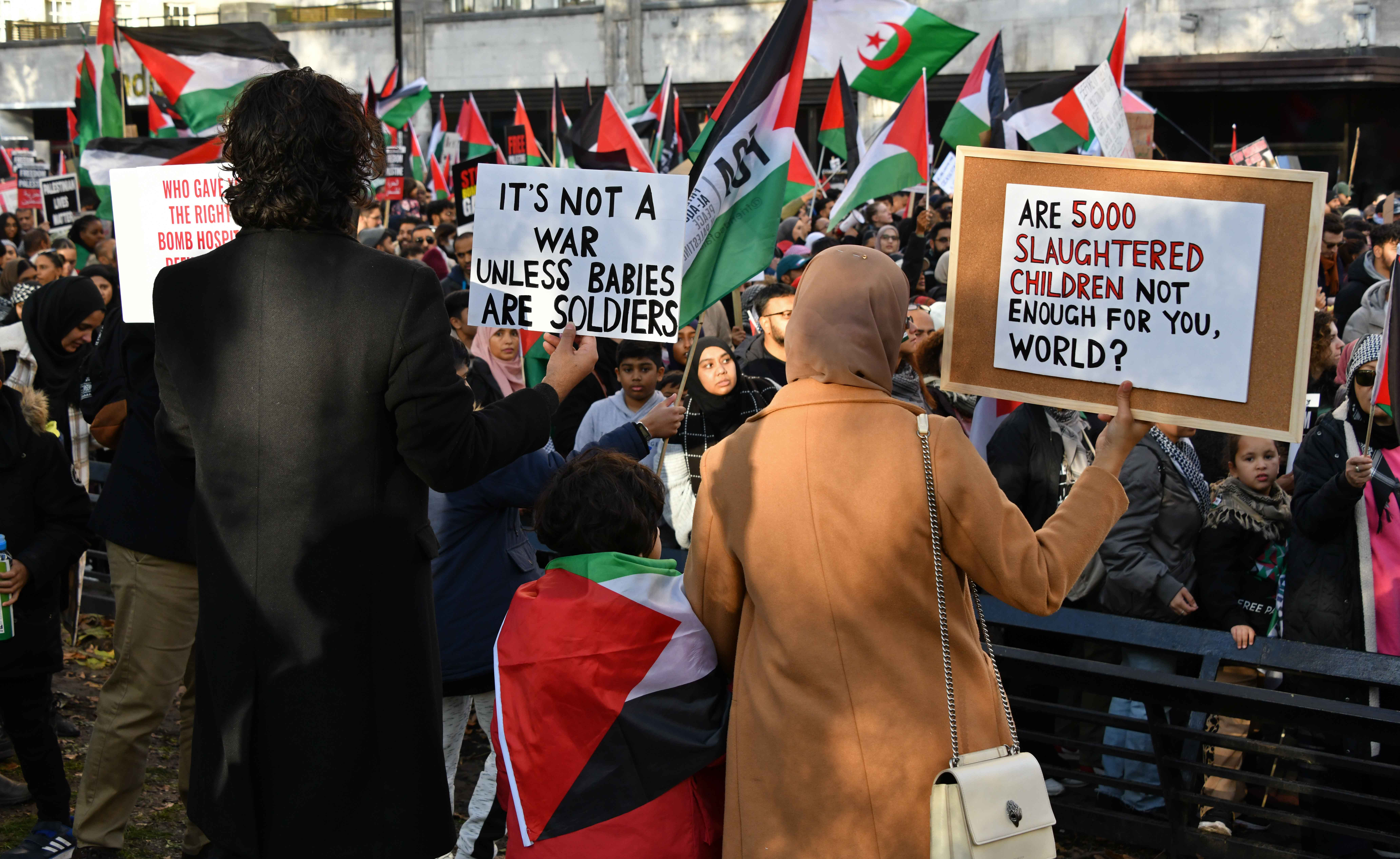
Pro-Palestinian march in London, 11 November 2023

There was particular controversy around the 11 November 2023 march in London because it coincided with Armistice Day, with then-Home Secretary Suella Braverman saying the march should be banned out of respect to Armistice Day events. Protesters and commentators, like military veteran Nadia Mitchell and British Army deserter Joe Glenton, said Armistice Day, which remembers the ceasefire called to end World War I, was a suitable day to call for another ceasefire. Days prior to the march, Braverman had accused the Metropolitan Police, London's police force, of being too lenient on pro-Palestinian demonstrators. During the day, far-right counter-protesters gathered at the Cenotaph, with some referencing Braverman's words as their reason for attending. Some of the counter-protesters were with the English Defence League and, earlier in the day, Stephen Yaxley-Lennon, otherwise known as Tommy Robinson, was seen leading far-right counter-protesters around Chinatown. Far-right counter-protesters fought with police while the march itself passed peacefully.

A number of politicians, including Keir Starmer, and a number of leading newspapers, said Braverman should resign or be removed from her cabinet position for increasing tension and division within the UK and stoking far-right violence on Armistice Day. Humza Yousaf, Scotland's first minister, said she had emboldened the far-right and had "fann[ed] the flames of division". On 13 November, then-Prime Minister Rishi Sunak sacked Braverman as home secretary amid a cabinet reshuffle.

=== Free speech ===
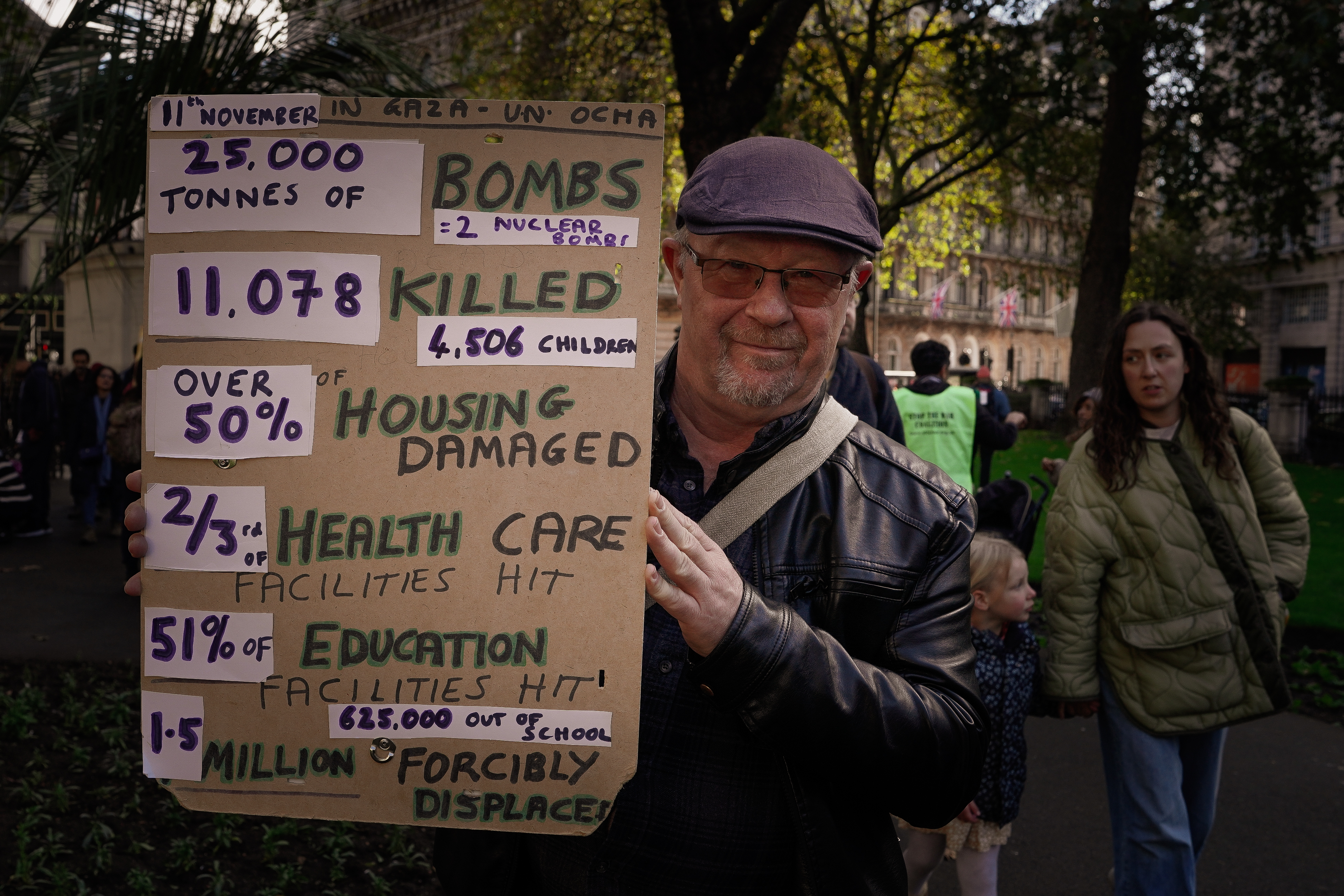
Solidarity protest for Palestine in London, 11 November 2023

As well as calling pro-Palestinian demonstrations "hate marches", Braverman wrote to police forces saying waving a Palestinian flag or saying certain chants – like "From the river to the sea, Palestine will be free" — may be a criminal offence. Labour suspended MP Andy McDonald for using the phrase "from the river to the sea". Michelle Donelan — who in her role as Minister of State for Higher and Further Education had introduced the Higher Education (Freedom of Speech) Act 2023, saying, "academic freedom in these institutions is being undermined in a way that endangers our entire democracy ... we find academics self-censoring themselves out of fear" — wrote a letter to UK Research and Innovation (UKRI) to express her "disgust and outrage" at the appointment of two academics to the non-departmental public body's equality, diversity and inclusion (EDI) advisory group, one of whom had "condemn[ed] violence on both sides but make reference to Israel's 'genocide and apartheid'". Following the politician's intervention, UKRI suspended the EDI group. A number of academics resigned from UKRI in protest, and 2,500 academics signed an open letter condemning the minister's intervention. Robert Jenrick, Minister of State for Immigration, instructed the Home Office to consider how they could revoke work visas and expel international students who "praise Hamas". Protestors, journalists such as Owen Jones, academics, charity organisers such as Ismail Patel, and civil liberty groups such as Liberty and the Open Rights Group, expressed concerns that the government, and Braverman in particular, were eroding free speech, seeing it as continuation of other governmental moves to control speech, such as the proposed Economic Activity of Public Bodies (Overseas Matters) Bill, which would ban councils from joining in Boycott, Divestment and Sanctions initiatives.

Following a speech by then-Prime Minister Rishi Sunak calling pro-Palestinian protesters "violent extremists" whose visas would be revoked, Amnesty International called his comments "deeply worrying" that the government might seek to restrict protests.
