= Abdul Waseh Basit =

Professor of pharmaceutics

Abdul W. Basit
- Born: November 1971 (age 54)
- Education: University of Bath (BPharm); The School of Pharmacy, University of London (PhD)
- Known for: 3D printing of pharmaceuticals Drug delivery Gastroenterology
- Scientific career
- Fields: Pharmaceutics
- Workplaces: University College London
- Doctoral advisor: John Michael Newton

Abdul Waseh Basit (born November 1971) is a professor of pharmaceutics at University College London, and founder of two pharmaceutical biotechnology companies spinning out of UCL. Basit is interested in particular in oral drug delivery and pharmaceutical three-dimensional (3D) printing.

== Education and career ==
Basit graduated with a first class honours degree in pharmacy in 1993 from the University of Bath and undertook his pharmacy pre-registration training at Pfizer Pharmaceuticals, becoming a registered pharmacist in 1994. He joined the School of Pharmacy, University of London (now UCL School of Pharmacy) in 1994 where he completed his PhD in pharmaceutics and was appointed professor in pharmaceutics in 2010.

Basit leads a research group based in University College London that investigates gastroenterology, metabolic potential of the gastrointestinal microbiota on drugs, and the development of modern pharmaceutical manufacturing techniques using three-dimensional (3D) printing. In 2016, Basit was appointed the European editor of the International Journal of Pharmaceutics. His h-index is currently 68 with over 13,000 citations.

In 2014, Basit founded FabRx with Simon Gaisford, Alvaro Goyanes Goyanes and Bill Lindsay spinning out from University College London. The firm is a biotechnology company that is developing 3D printing technology for medicines and medical devices. In 2017, FabRx was awarded the TCT Best Start-Up Award. In 2019, it received over £600,000 from Innovate UK to develop a 3D printer for the production of personalised medicines. In 2016, Basit co-founded Intract Pharma; the firm is a pharmaceutical company that provides licensable technologies for targeted delivery in the gastrointestinal tract. In 2018, it received £1.4 million from Innovate UK to develop a scalable manufacturing process for oral antibody products.

== Awards and honours ==
- 2014 Academy of Pharmaceutical Sciences AstraZeneca Award

== Publications ==
- 3D Printing of Pharmaceuticals
