= The Pharmacy Guild of Australia =

Australian employers' organisation

- Abbreviation: Guild
- Formation: 1927 (as the Federated Pharmaceutical Services Guild of Australia)
- Type: Employers' organisation
- Purpose: Representing pharmacy owners and proprietors
- Headquarters: Barton, Australian Capital Territory
- President: Trent Twomey
- Executive Director: Gerard Benedet
- Website: guild.org.au

The Pharmacy Guild of Australia is a national employer's organisation representing pharmacy owners in Australia. Еstablished in 1927 as the Federated Pharmaceutical Services Guild of Australia, it is registered under the Fair Work Act 2009 as an employer organisation and as a Registered Training Organisation.

The principal role of the organisation is to represent the interests of its members in industrial matters with the Fair Work Commission and state jurisdictions; secondary roles include negotiating Community Pharmacy Agreements with the Australian Government and providing advocacy for members on political issues. The Guild also maintains commercial interests in a number of businesses which span corporate insurance, legal services, outsourced payroll services, pharmaceuticals, pharmacy IT software and superannuation.

The Guild's national office is located in Barton, Australian Capital Territory, in addition to the offices of its branches in each of the states and territories in Australia.

The Guild is a member of the World Pharmacy Council.

== Structure of the Pharmacy Guild of Australia ==
=== National Council ===
The National Council is the governing body of the organisation. The National Council governs Guild policies and makes decision on major issues. It also has the power to amend the Constitution, subject to referendum where required. Supporting the National Council in the development of policies are several committees that undertake research, provide advice and draft policy.

=== National President ===
The National President works closely with the Executive Director and the Secretariat, and is the spokesperson for the Guild.

=== Executive Director ===
The Executive Director is responsible for the implementation of the policies, decisions and agenda set by the National Council. The Executive Director is responsible for the management of the Secretariat, the administrative arm of the Guild.

=== State and territory branches ===
Branch activities centre on the day-to-day servicing of members in such fields as industrial relations, marketing, staff training, and product and economic information. The Guild has branches in every Australian State and (mainland) Territory:

- Australian Capital Territory
- New South Wales
- Northern Territory
- Queensland
- South Australia
- Tasmania
- Victoria
- Western Australia

== Function ==
=== Services ===
In addition to its advocacy and negotiation function, the Guild provides a range of services to its members. These include:

- Business development programs
- Government relations and policy
- Education and training
- Quality assurance
- Rural, professional and corporate services
- Public health pharmacy programs
- Pharmacy publications
- Events

=== Community pharmacy agreements ===
Since 1990, the Government of Australia has entered into and funded seven successive five-year community pharmacy agreements with the Guild to provide a funding arrangement for the dispensing of Pharmaceutical Benefits Scheme (PBS) medicines to the public.

The pharmacy agreements set out the amounts of the various fees ('pharmacy remuneration') which pharmacies are paid to dispense PBS and Repatriation Pharmaceutical Benefits Scheme (RPBS) medicines, as well as the estimated total cost of pharmacy remuneration over the life of the agreement.

More recently the agreements have provided the funding for additional clinical services intended to improve the use of PBS and RPBS medicines in the community.

== Commercial Interests ==
=== Guild Insurance ===
Established in 1963, Guild Insurance provides business insurance, professional indemnity, home & contents and car insurance.

=== Guild Super ===
Established in 1994, Guild Trustee Services Pty Limited (GTS) is the trustee for the Guild Retirement Fund (GRF), which includes GuildSuper, Child Care Super and GuildPension.

=== Meridian Lawyers ===
Established in 2004, with the aim of providing legal services, Meridian provides legal advice in insurance law, health law, corporate and commercial law, employment law, commercial litigation and dispute resolution from their offices in Sydney, Melbourne, Newcastle, Brisbane and Perth.

=== Gold Cross ===
Established in 1940 as Gilseal and renamed Gold Cross Products & Services in 1997, Gold Cross endorses pharmacy products and services badged with the Guild's logo. The company owns the Glucojel Confectionary and is the publisher of the official journal of the Pharmacy Guild of Australia, In The Know (ITK).

=== MedAdvisor ===
Established as Guildlink in 1995, as a Medicines Information platform and Information Technology Company. GuildLink has been working with pharmaceutical companies, dispensing software vendors and health information providers to distribute medicines information electronically to the Australian market. In 2011 GuildCare was launched as part of the Pharmacy Guild of Australia's initiative to have a national systemised platform for delivering of professional health services. In 2022 Guildlink merged with US based Medadvisor and The Guild became the largest shareholder.

=== FRED IT Group ===
Established in 1992, Fred IT Group provides software services to the pharmacy industry. Fred IT currently provides:

- cloud based management platform specifically for pharmacy
- dispense solution for retail pharmacy – Fred Dispense
- Fred Office and POS Solutions which integrate to provide management of the professional and commercial aspects of retail pharmacy
- cloud-based server and network monitoring and maintenance, and backup and recovery
- Supply and installation of IT hardware

=== Australian Association of Consultant Pharmacy (AACP) ===
Established in 1992, the AACP is the major credentialing body for professional pharmacy cognitive services that are remunerated separately from the supply of medicines. Its primary role is to develop and administer the assessment process leading to the accreditation of registered pharmacists.

The AACP was established to develop a national approach to the practice of 'consultant' pharmacy as an expansion of the professional health role of pharmacy in Australia. As such, it promotes and seeks recognition for the practice of consultant pharmacy and the provision of value-added, professional services in Australia.

== Controversy ==
In mid-2018, the Pharmacy Guild Of Australia paid $15,000 in donations to the One Nation political party. This led to complaints from Pharmacy Guild members, due in part to anti-vaccination comments made by the One Nation leader Pauline Hanson. The Victorian president of the Pharmacy Guild, Anthony Tassone, defended the political donation, quoted as saying “The guild continuously considers and reviews its donations to political parties”.

== See also ==
- List of employer associations
- List of pharmacy associations
