= Adexa =

German trade union

ADEXA
- ADEXA - Die Apothekengewerkschaft
- Founded: 1954
- Headquarters: Hamburg, Germany
- Location: Germany
- Key people: Barbara Neusetzer, first chairperson
- Website: www.adexa-online.de/

ADEXA is the German trade union for all pharmaceutical employees, and also for trainees and students. ADEXA negotiates the salaries and working conditions in German public pharmacies with the employers’ federations. The headquarters of the trade union is in Hamburg.

Pharmaceutical employees being organized in this trade union are entitled to all agreed conditions of pay and contract terms such as overtime pay, bonuses and extra holiday entitlement.

For their members, ADEXA offers also legal advice and protection, lobbying, media representation, and information concerning occupational politics.

== History ==
In 1949, the Tarifgemeinschaft deutscher angestellter Apotheker was founded. In 1954, it was dissolved, and a new organisation, the Bundesverband der Angestellten in Apotheken, was founded as its successor. In 2004, it was renamed ADEXA. In 2012, ADEXA joined EPhEU (the European Association of Employed community Pharmacists in Europe. EPhEU is a network representing the interests of employed community pharmacists.
