= International Journal of Pharmaceutics =

- Discipline: Pharmaceutics
- Language: English
- Edited by: J Siepmann

Publication details
- History: 1978–present
- Publisher: Elsevier
- Frequency: 39/year
- Open access: Hybrid
- Impact factor: 5.8 (2022)

Standard abbreviations
- ISO 4: Int. J. Pharm.

Indexing
- CODEN: IJPHDE
- ISSN: 0378-5173 (print); 1873-3476 (web)
- LCCN: sc80000643
- OCLC no.: 03687036

Links
- Journal homepage; Online access

The International Journal of Pharmaceutics is a peer-reviewed medical journal covering physical, chemical, biological, microbiological, and engineering studies related to the conception, design, production, characterization, and evaluation of drug delivery systems in vitro and in vivo.
