= Pharmaceutical Association of Israel =

- Founded: 1920
- Location: Israel
- Region served: State of Israel
- Services: Professional services for pharmacists
- Website: www.pharmacy.org.il
- Formerly called: The Internationally Licensed Pharmacists Association of the Land of Israel

The Pharmaceutical Association of Israel (Hebrew: הסתדרות הרוקחים, Histadrut HaRokhim) is a nonprofit umbrella organization for promoting and supporting pharmacies and pharmacists in Israel. It was founded in 1920 as The Internationally Licensed Pharmacists Association of the Land of Israel and got its current name with the founding of the state in 1948. The association has 500 full members and another 800 associates, and is a member of the International Pharmaceutical Federation (FIP).

== Overview ==
The association provides professional courses held throughout the year, holding conferences and workshops. Providing: insurance, nursing care, professional books, holidays, pharmacy equipment etc. at reduced rates for its members. The association is represented in parliamentary committees on issues pertaining to the pharmaceutical profession.

Permanent public relations, financial and legal facilities are available to members. The association publishes a journal, The Israeli Pharmaceutical Journal, which provides updates on the profession and a platform for discussion among all pharmacists in the country. It also works closely with the pharmaceutical industry, including distribution and manufacturing.

The association has three branches, Tel Aviv, Jerusalem and Haifa, dividing the country into these three regions. Each branch has its own officers, who are represented on the Central Council. It has scientific, professional, ethical, social, strategy and educational committees, and a disciplinary court. Although it is not compulsory to be a member of the association, it enjoys the support of most pharmacists in the private sector.
