= EPhEU =

- Employed Community Pharmacists in Europe
- Founded: 2012
- Headquarters: Vienna, Austria
- Location: Europe
- Affiliations: Independent
- Website: www.epheu.eu

Employed Community Pharmacists in Europe (EPhEU) is an umbrella organization of European associations and Trade Unions representing the interests of employed community pharmacists. The aim is to improve the general professional conditions in Europe by taking part in the legislation process. The organization also informs pharmacists, who want to work in another member country. For this the regulations in the different countries have to be observed.

== History ==
On 21 January 2012 delegates from Belgium, Germany, France, Croatia and Austria signed the statutes of EPhEU . General Assemblies with the participation of all member countries are held at regular intervals.

== Founding Members ==
EPhEU has the following members:

- ADEXA – Die Apothekengewerkschaft (Germany) (German Pharmacy union)
- Verband Angestellter Apotheker Österreichs (VAAOE) (Austria) (Austrian Association for employed pharmacists)
- Section D of the French Chamber of Pharmacists and the union CFE-CGC Chimie (both France)
- Pharmaceutical Society of Croatia
- OPHACO (association of Belgian cooperative pharmacies) (Belgium)

=== Organization ===
EPhEU has the following organisation:

- President: Andreas May (ADEXA, Germany)
- Vice- President: Philippe Floquet (CFE-CGC and Conseil Central D de l’Ordre National des Pharmaciens, France)
- Secretary General: Katarina Fehir Sola (Pharmacists defence association, Croatia)
- Treasurer: Norbert Valecka (VAAOE, Austria)

=== Working groups ===
- Continuing education
- Differences in the exercise of the profession in EU-Member states
- Foreign Pharmacists in EU-Member states
- Differences in the regulation of working time

=== Events ===
On 30 June 2012, in Brussels, during the 1st General Assembly, the members of the executive board were elected. At the same time, the delegates passed the internal rules and installed several working groups. On 5 April 2013, in Paris, during the 2nd general Assembly the Pharmacists’ Defence Association (PDA) from UK became a member of EPhEU. Delegates from all member associations discussed different directives planned by the EU – Commission as: working time (stand-by duty, limits of working time); Professional Qualifications and working in other EU – member states; Falsified Medicines. Unanimously the delegates stated that it is absolutely necessary for community pharmacists to know the language spoken in the state they want to work in. Just as unanimously they refused an individual opt- out of the working time directive by employment contract.
