= Canadian Society of Hospital Pharmacists =

Canadian professional organization

Canadian Society of Healthcare-Systems Pharmacy (formerly known as Canadian Society of Hospital Pharmacists)
- Abbreviation: CSHP
- Formation: 1950
- Type: Professional association
- Headquarters: Ottawa, Ontario
- Region served: Canada
- Fields: Pharmacy
- Members: More than 3,000 (2016)
- President: Patrick Fitch
- Website: www.cshp.ca

The Canadian Society of Healthcare-Systems Pharmacy (CSHP) formerly known as Canadian Society of Hospital Pharmacists is a professional organization representing the interests of pharmacists who practice in hospitals and related healthcare settings. It publishes the Canadian Journal of Hospital Pharmacy. The CSHP has more than 3,000 hospital pharmacists as members.
