= International Pharmaceutical Federation =

Pharmacy organization

- Fédération Internationale Pharmaceutique
- Abbreviation: FIP
- Formation: 25 September 1912
- Headquarters: The Hague, Netherlands
- Website: www.fip.org

The International Pharmaceutical Federation or Fédération Internationale Pharmaceutique (FIP) is a non-governmental organization (NGO) with official relations with the World Health Organization. It is the global body representing over four million pharmacists, pharmaceutical scientists and pharmaceutical educators through 158 national organisations, academic institutional members and individual members.

== Vision and Mission ==
FIP's vision is a world where everyone benefits from access to safe, effective, quality and affordable medicines and health technologies, as well as from pharmaceutical care services provided by pharmacists, in collaboration with other healthcare professionals.

Its mission is to support global health by enabling the advancement of pharmaceutical practice, sciences and education.

== History ==
The Federation was founded on 25 September 1912 in The Hague, the Netherlands ahead of the 11th international pharmaceutical congress to be organised in that city in 1913. It was the outcome of the series of international pharmaceutical congresses held in the nineteenth century, more specifically the 6th congress held in Brussels in 1885.

Following the adoption of the first Brussels Pharmacopoeia Agreement in 1902, and after an initiative of the Royal Dutch Pharmaceutical Society in 1909, the 10th international pharmaceutical congress in 1910 in Brussels resolved to establish an international pharmaceutical federation in The Hague.

The first president was Prof. Dr. Leopold van Itallie, a professor at Leiden University. The first secretary-general was Dr. J.J. Hofman, pharmacist in The Hague.

== Structure ==
FIP’s activities can be divided into three main areas — science, practice and education — led by its Board of Pharmaceutical Sciences, Board of Pharmaceutical Practice, and FIP Education, respectively. These work collaboratively towards FIP’s vision and mission.

=== Sciences ===
Work to advance the pharmaceutical sciences globally is primarily done through six special interest groups (SIGs). There are SIGs for:

- Drug delivery and manufacturing
- New generation of pharmaceutical scientists
- New medicines
- Personalised and precision medicine
- Pharmacy practice research
- Regulatory sciences and quality

=== Practice ===
- A priority for FIP is to advance pharmacy practice in all settings, and this is led through the projects and initiatives of eight pharmacy practice sections. There are sections for:
  - Academic pharmacy
  - Clinical biology
  - Community pharmacy
  - Health and medicines information
  - Hospital pharmacy
  - Industrial pharmacy
  - Military and emergency pharmacy
  - Social and administrative pharmacy

=== Education ===
The reform of pharmacy education (including pharmaceutical workforce development) is a third objective, and this is the purpose of FIP Education (FIPEd), which includes:

- Academic Pharmacy Section members (faculty members and educators);
- Academic institutional members (deans of schools of pharmacy and pharmaceutical sciences);
- A Workforce Development Hub of experts focused on academic capacity, early career training strategy, quality assurance, advances and specialist development, competency development, leadership development, advancing integrated services, working with others, continuing professional development strategies, equity and equality, impact and outcomes, pharmacy intelligence and policy development;
- A Pharmacy Technicians and Support Workforce Strategic Platform and its advisory committee; and
- The FIP-UNESCO UNITWIN programme (regional university networks to advance pharmaceutical education), which is a global partnership between FIP and UNESCO.

FIP also directs effort towards supporting early career pharmacists and pharmaceutical scientists through its Early Career Pharmaceutical Group.

== See also ==
- Evidence-based pharmacy in developing countries
- History of pharmacy
- List of pharmacy associations
- List of pharmacy schools
- Pharmacy
- Pharmacist
