= Pakistan Pharmacists Association =

- Nickname: PPA
- Headquarters: Islamabad
- Region served: Pakistan
- Founder: Prof. Dr. Mian Naim Anwar Muzzafar
- President: Rehmatullah Khan
- Senior Vice President: Furqan K Hashmi (Punjab), Rashid Mureed (Sindh), Farman Ullah (Khyber Pakhtunkhwa), S Ghulam Sarwar Bangulzai (Balochistan), Ghulam Farid (Islamabad)
- Website: ppapak.org.pk

The Pakistan Pharmacists Association (PPA) is the national professional body of pharmacists and pharmacy students in Pakistan. Founded in 1978 by Dr. Naim Anwar Muzzafar, its mission is to promote and expand the profession of pharmacy and the role of pharmacists. The association is dedicated to improving public health and patient care by enhancing professional development of the pharmacists along with Pharmacy Council of Pakistan.

== Objectives ==
- To promote the pharmacy as a component of the healthcare team
- To contribute to education programs for pharmacists already engaged in the practice to improve the medication use and health outcomes of patients
- To promote high standards of professional conduct amongst pharmacists
- To provide leadership in the identification, development, and implementation of health policies of concern to pharmacy
- To hold seminars, symposia, exhibitions, and conferences

== Conferences ==
- Organized four international conferences during the last tenure, two in Karachi and the other two in Lahore
- Organized 13th international pharmaceutical conference and exhibition in April 2006 at Lahore
- Organized 14th international pharmaceutical conference and exhibition in 2007 at Karachi
- Organized 15th international pharmaceutical conference and exhibition in April 2008 at Lahore
- Organized 16th international pharmaceutical conference and exhibition in April 2016 at Lahore

== Memberships ==
- Member of the Commonwealth Pharmacist Association (CPA) and Federation of Asian Pharmacists Association (FAPA)
- Elected regional representative of Asia in CPA

== Disaster help ==
- Camps for the help of earthquake victim and Internally Displaced Persons (IDPs) within 24 hours of the emergencies
- Formed a natural disaster committee which received contributions and provided aid to the earthquake disaster victims
