= American Society for Pharmacy Law =

Professional organization

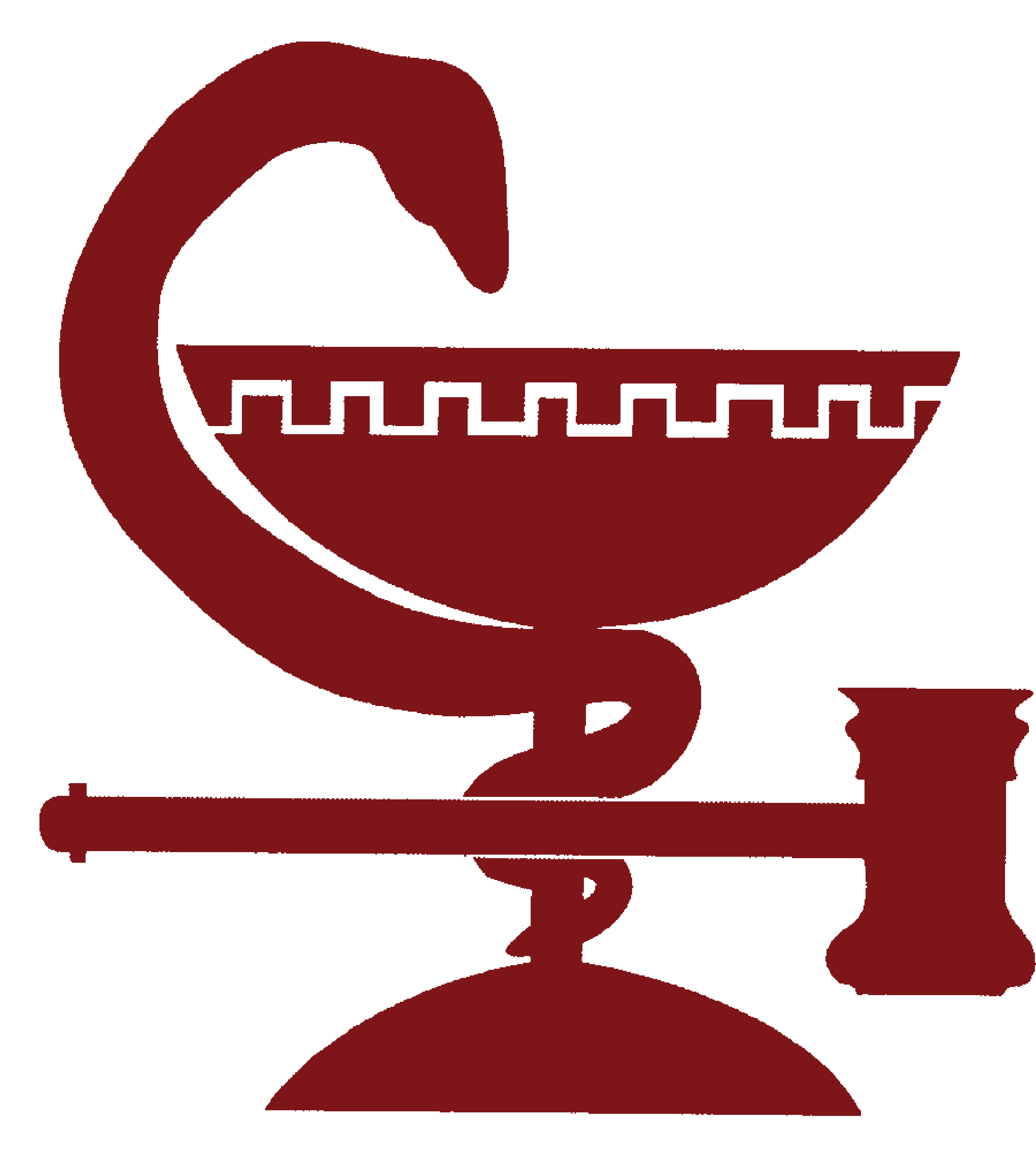
- Formation: 1974
- Headquarters: Springfield, IL
- Website: aspl.org

The American Society of Pharmacy Law (ASPL) is a professional organization of pharmacist-attorneys, pharmacists, attorneys, and students in schools of pharmacy or law who are interested in the law as it applies to pharmacy.

ASPL is a nonprofit organization with the purposes of furthering knowledge in the law related to pharmacists, pharmacies, the provision of pharmaceutical care, the manufacturing and distribution of drugs, and other food, drug, and medical device policy issues; communicating accurate legal educational information; and providing educational opportunities for pharmacists, attorneys, and others who are interested in pharmacy law.

== Goals ==
The Society seeks to educate the pharmacist-attorneys, pharmacists, attorneys and other interested parties on legal issues that affect pharmacy. Its aims are to

1. Further legal knowledge.
2. Communicate accurate legal information to attorneys and pharmacists.
3. Foster knowledge and education pertaining to the rights and duties of pharmacists.
4. Distribute information of interest to the membership via a newsletter and other appropriate publications.
5. Provide a forum for the exchange of information pertaining to pharmacy law.

== History ==
ASPL was founded in 1974 by Joseph L. Fink III, a pharmacist-lawyer on the faculty of the Philadelphia College of Pharmacy and Science.

== Activities ==
ASPL maintains a website containing information and useful web links for members and anyone who is interested in the law as it applies to the profession of pharmacy. Its website also attempts to help those interested in searching for pharmacist-attorneys, an attorney with a particular interest in pharmacy law in a specific state or expert witnesses on topics related to pharmacy. The Society confers a number of national awards in the field and sponsors or cosponsors two national conferences each year on topics related to pharmacy law and ethics. The Society also holds an annual meeting and conference with continuing pharmacist (CPE) and lawyer (CLE) programming in the fall (November).

== See also ==
- History of pharmacy
