= British Islamic Medical Association =

Professional association in the UK

- Abbreviation: BIMA
- Formation: 2013
- Type: medical
- Location: United Kingdom
- President: Dr. Salman Wagar
- Board of directors: Ahmed Bachelani; Dr. Sahira Saleem Dar
- Affiliations: Muslim Council of Britain; Federation of Islamic Medical Associations
- Website: britishima.org

The British Islamic Medical Association (BIMA) is a British organisation which aims to serve Muslim healthcare professionals in the UK. The association was founded in 2013 and is an affiliate of the Muslim Council of Britain and the Federation of Islamic Medical Associations.

== Campaigns ==
=== National Health Promotion ===
The British Islamic Medical Association holds regular conferences and workshops and has created tool kits to address various issues that are dealt with by Muslim medical professionals. One such project has been ‘Lifesavers’, launched in association with the British Heart Foundation. The project was carried out in collaboration with mosques in the UK, and aimed to train members of the public and Muslim communities in basic life support and cardiopulmonary resuscitation.

In a similar project, the association has also collaborated with Cancer Research UK on a project aiming to educate members of the public and Muslim communities about bowel cancer and raise awareness about the availability and importance of bowel cancer screening services.

=== British Medical Association and the National Health Service ===
Along with other medical associations and medical professionals, the British Islamic Medical Association joined the British Medical Association in opposition to comments made at the 2016 Conservative Party Conference in which medical professionals working in the NHS from overseas were referred to as an ‘interim workforce’.
