= World Pharmacy Council =

International non-profit organization

World Pharmacy Council (the Council)
- Abbreviation: the Council
- Formation: 1987
- Type: International Non-profit Organization
- Purpose: Representing and advancing the role of community pharmacies in global healthcare
- Location: Australia (company registration)
- Region served: Worldwide, advanced OECD economies
- Members: Various national pharmacy organizations
- Website: www.worldpharmacycouncil.org

The World Pharmacy Council (the Council) is an international non-profit organization dedicated to representing and advancing the role of community pharmacies in global healthcare systems. Established in 1987, the Council provides a unified voice for community pharmacists, advocating for their critical role in patient care and public health.

== History ==
The origins of the World Pharmacy Council date back to 1987 with the formation of Pharmintercom. This group consisted of community pharmacy organizations from seven countries that met annually to share information, discuss best practices, and address challenges facing community pharmacy. Recognizing the need for a more formal and influential global body, Pharmintercom members agreed to incorporate, establishing The World Pharmacy Council in 2016. The establishment of a World Pharmacy Council was discussed during the Pharmintercom meeting in Boston in August 2016. During an international teleconference held on 25 May 2017, the Constitution and By-laws of the Council were approved / accepted. Since its inception, the Council has expanded its membership to include numerous national community pharmacy organizations across Europe, North America, Asia and Australasia.

The formation of the World Pharmacy Council is grounded in broader academic discussions about the need for a global body to unify pharmacists and advocate for their expanding role, a topic explored in journals such as Innovations in Pharmacy.

== Purpose ==
The Council's primary purpose is to advocate for the recognition and integration of community pharmacists' skills and services within healthcare systems worldwide. The organization strives to highlight the vital role community pharmacies play in providing accessible healthcare, managing medication therapies, delivering public health services, and contributing to positive patient outcomes. The Council works to influence health policy at both national and international levels, promoting the full scope of practice for community pharmacists and their inclusion in integrated care models.

The Council's focus on expanding the scope of practice for community pharmacists aligns with global trends identified in independent academic research, which highlights the growing role of pharmacists as prescribers in several member countries.

== Structure and governance ==
The World Pharmacy Council operates as a not-for-profit public company registered in Australia, with its registered office located in Melbourne, Victoria. It is regulated by the Australian Securities & Investments Commission (ASIC). The Council is governed by a Board of Directors composed of representatives from its member organizations.

The President of the World Pharmacy Council is Professor Trent Twomey of The Pharmacy Guild of Australia. Professor Twomey was appointed in 2025, succeeding Douglas Hoey, pharmacist and CEO of the USA's National Community Pharmacists Association who had served as President since 2021.

== Activities ==
The Council engages in various activities to achieve its objectives, including:

- Advocacy: Representing the interests of community pharmacy at international forums like the OECD. As an Associate Expert Group member of Business at OECD (BIAC), the Council participates in discussions and contributes to policy development related to health and business.
- Research and Data Analysis: Publishing sector analysis reports and conducting research on the impact and value of community pharmacy.
- Networking and Collaboration: Facilitating communication and collaboration among member organizations.
- Annual Conferences: Organizing international conferences to share knowledge and promote best practices.
- Policy Development: Contributing to the development of policies that support the role of community pharmacy in healthcare systems.

== Members ==
The Council comprises full and affiliate members. Full members are national pharmacy organizations representing community pharmacists in their respective countries. Affiliate members are companies and other organizations with an interest in the field of community pharmacy. As of September 2026, the full members include:

- Australia The Pharmacy Guild of Australia
- Austria Austrian Pharmacy Owners Association (Österreichischer Apothekerverband)
- Belgium Association of Pharmacists Belgium (APB)
- Canada Neighbourhood Pharmacy Association of Canada
- Denmark Danmarks Apotekerforening (Danish Pharmacies Association)
- Finland The Association of Finnish Pharmacies (AFP)
- Germany Federal Union of German Associations of Pharmacists (ABDA)
- Ireland Irish Pharmacy Union (IPU)
- Israel Israel Pharmacists Association
- Japan Japan Pharmaceutical Association (JPA)
- New Zealand The Pharmacy Guild of New Zealand (PGNZ)
- Portugal Associação Nacional das Farmácias (National Association of Pharmacies, ANF)
- Spain Consejo General de Colegios Oficiales de Farmacéuticos (General Council of Official Colleges of Pharmacists)
- Switzerland pharmaSuisse (Swiss Pharmacists Association)
- United Kingdom National Pharmacy Association (NPA)
- United Kingdom Community Pharmacy England (CPE)
- United States National Community Pharmacists Association (NCPA)
