= Esteve Pharmacy =

Building in Girona Province, Spain

Coordinates: 42°27′54.14″N 01°58′55.12″E

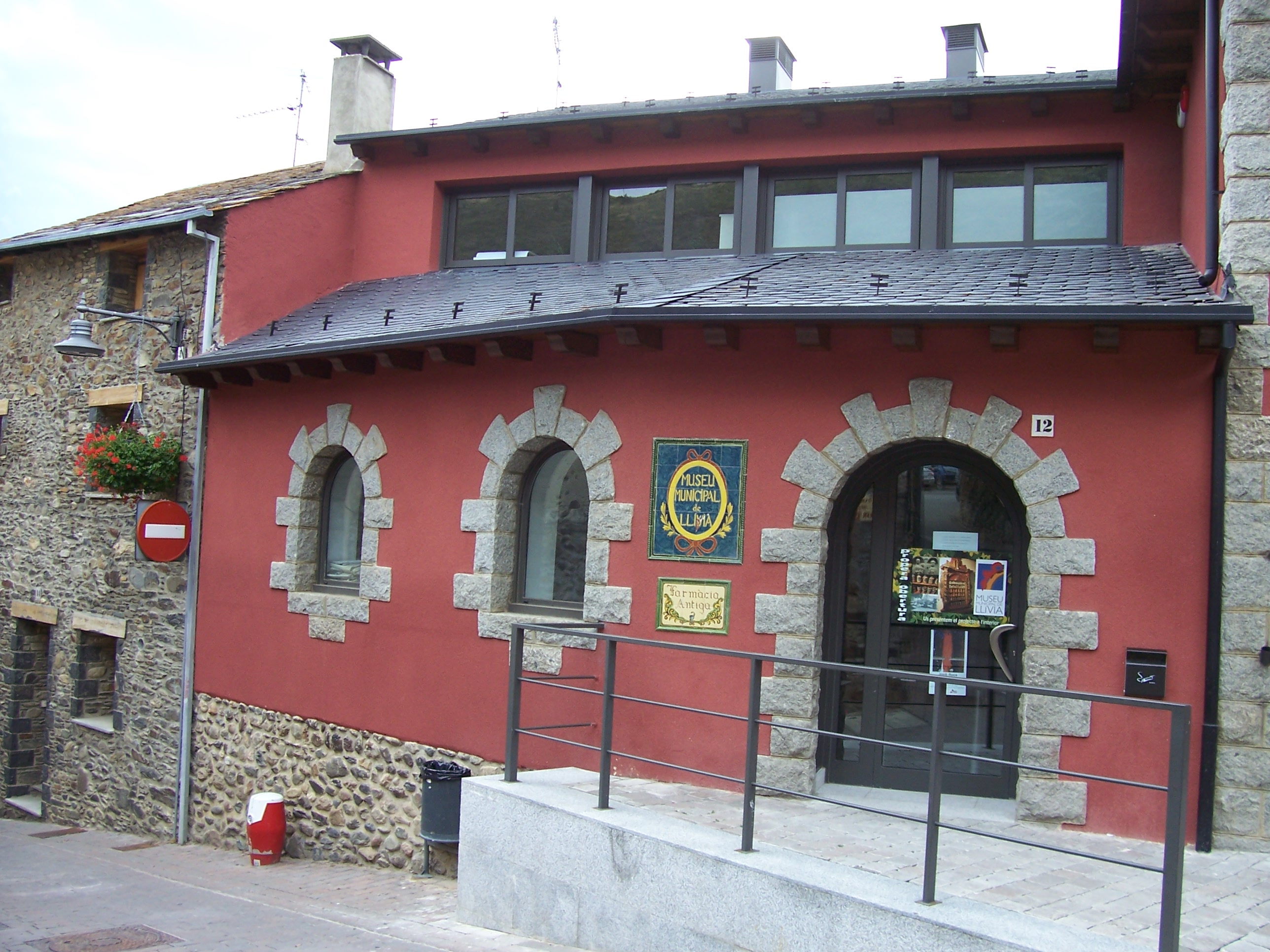
Medieval Esteve Pharmacy

The Esteve Pharmacy (Catalan: Farmàcia Esteve, IPA: [fəɾˈmasiə əsˈteβə]) is a medieval pharmacy and museum located in the town of Llívia, in the comarca of Cerdanya, Catalonia, Spain. Llívia is a Spanish exclave within the French region of Pyrénées-Orientales. The Esteve Pharmacy, founded at the beginning of the 15th century, is one of the oldest pharmacies in Europe and keeps a collection of albarellos from the 16th and 17th centuries, glass from the 19th century, Renaissance boxes with portraits of saints and personages, a library, laboratory instruments, antique drugs and preparations, old prescription books, and a Baroque "cordialer" cupboard made by Josep Sunyer during the period when the Esteve family managed the pharmacy for up to seven generations. It is one of the most important collections of its kind in Europe.

In 1942, Lleó Antoni Esteve closed the pharmacy and moved to Puigcerdà. In 1958 the pharmacy was transferred to the town of Llívia, and the Province of Girona Diputació purchased it in 1965.

== The blue albarellos ==
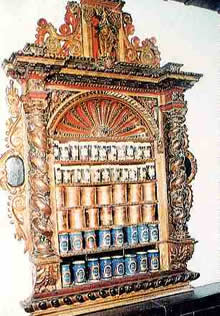
Cupboard of the Esteve Pharmacy

Blue albarellos of the Esteve Pharmacy

The Esteve pharmacy maintains a collection of several albarellos or blue jars. These are traditional medicinal jars designed to hold apothecaries' ointments and dry drugs. They are cylindrical and taller than they are wide, with a smaller diameter at the top. They are cobalt blue in color. The base is never colored, which possibly means that the albarellos were bathed in color while holding them from the base. The interior is of white enamel.

There are three types of albarellos, as follows:

- simple, which are used to store specific elements in their natural state. These are the largest of the 3 types.
- compounds, containing drugs made of simple elements of frequent use and long conservation. These include ointments and medicinal preserves and are of medium size.
- "cordialer" albarellos, containing semi-elaborated products, extracts or powder of simple products or special compounds of infrequent use, and confections. These are smaller and are named after the "cordialer", the cupboard where they are stored.

The simple ones measure about 30 centimetres (12 in), while the cordialer ones measure about 13–14 cm (5.1–5.5 in).

They were initially not decorated in order to reduce costs. The interior is of white glazed enamel, which could be due to either a fashion or a practical reason. With no decoration, the pharmacist had greater freedom to reuse the jars. However, the fact they had no written signs could lead to confusion, so it was common to place diagonal paper bands on the jars, labeled in Gothic letters. This identification system was used until Josep Esteve modernized the system.

Josep Esteve added labels to the albarellos without heating them. Not only did he paint them, but he also imitated a polychrome contemporary production from Banyoles and drew a medallion of Louis XVI style (a clear influence from France) and yellow vertical profiling with a red ribbon. A few bunches of parsley on the side highlighted it in yellow. The free space inside the oval included the written abbreviation of the jar content. This innovation could have come from the rivalry with the Martí pharmacy from Puigcerdà during the 18th century. Other collections of the Iberian peninsula also introduced this system.

Blue albarellos are found in Llívia (87), Barcelona (28), El Masnou (75) and Ille-sur-Têt (40). There are also others scattered throughout museums. Their origin is unknown and has been an intriguing mystery, because it is not clear where or when they originated.
