= Llívia =

- Municipality
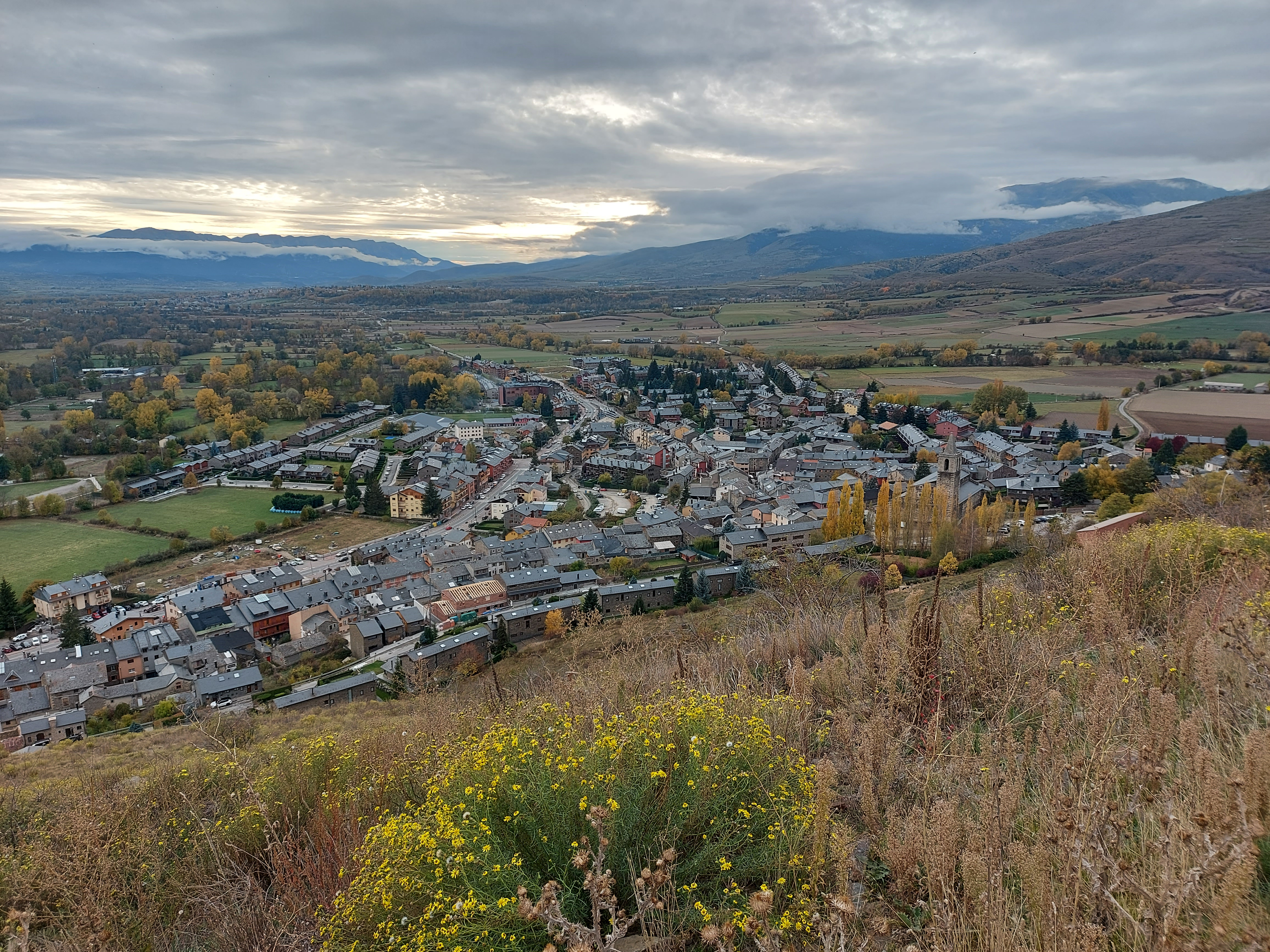

- Flag Coat of arms

- Location in the province of Girona Location in Catalonia Location in Spain
- Coordinates: 42°27′52″N 1°58′51″E
- Country: Spain
- Autonomous community: Catalonia
- Province: Girona
- Comarca: Cerdanya
- Judicial district: Puigcerdà

Government
  - Mayor: Albert Cruïlles Ruaix (2024)

Area
  - Total: 12.9 km^{2} (5.0 sq mi)
- Elevation: 1,224 m (4,016 ft)

Population (2025-01-01)
  - Total: 1,562
  - Density: 121/km^{2} (314/sq mi)
- Demonyms: Llivienc, llivienca (ca); Lliviense (es)
- Time zone: UTC+1 (CET)
  - Summer (DST): UTC+2 (CEST)
- Postal code: 17527
- Website: llivia.eu

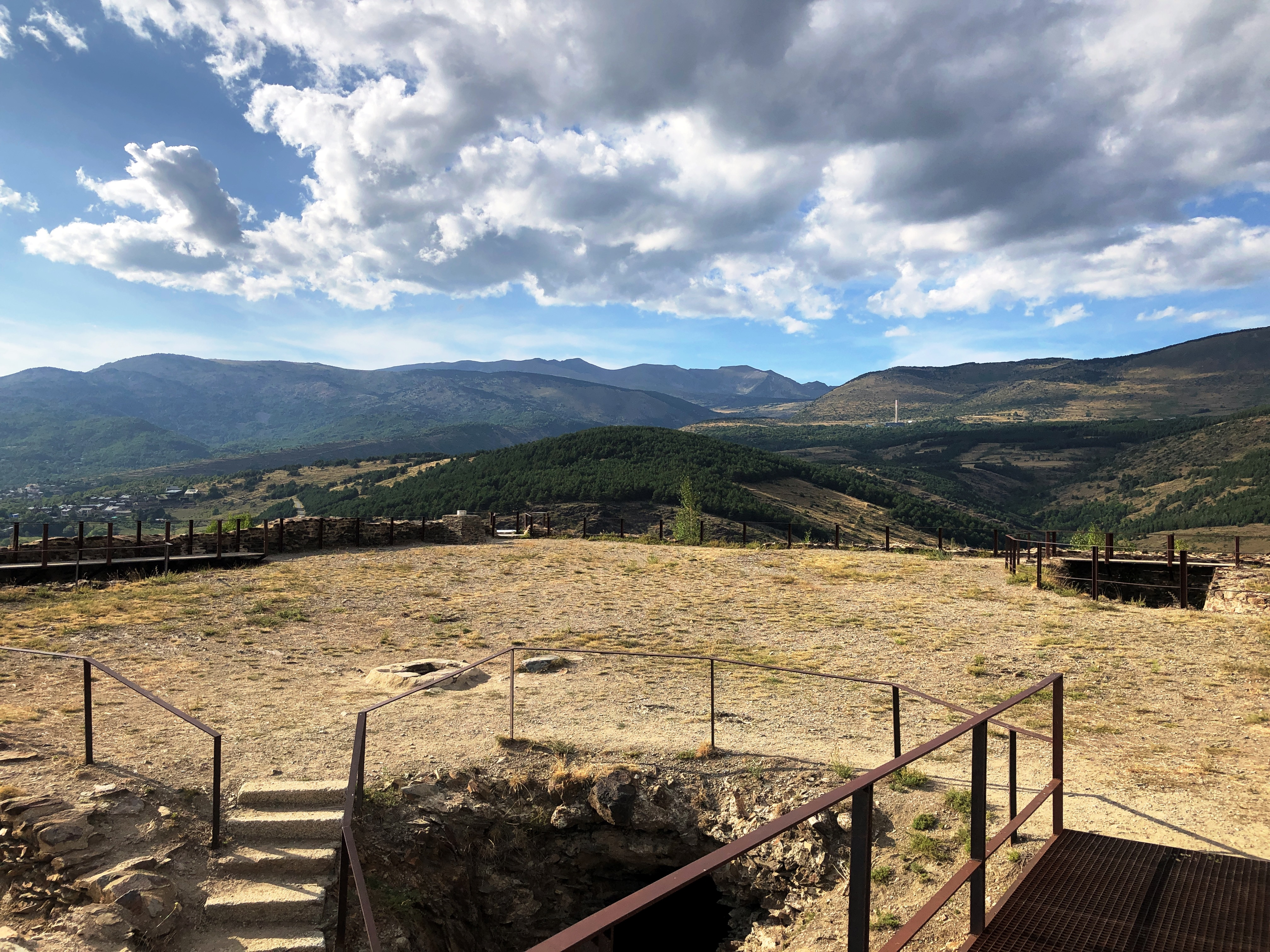
Ruins of Llívia Castle, destroyed by French forces in the Catalan Civil War

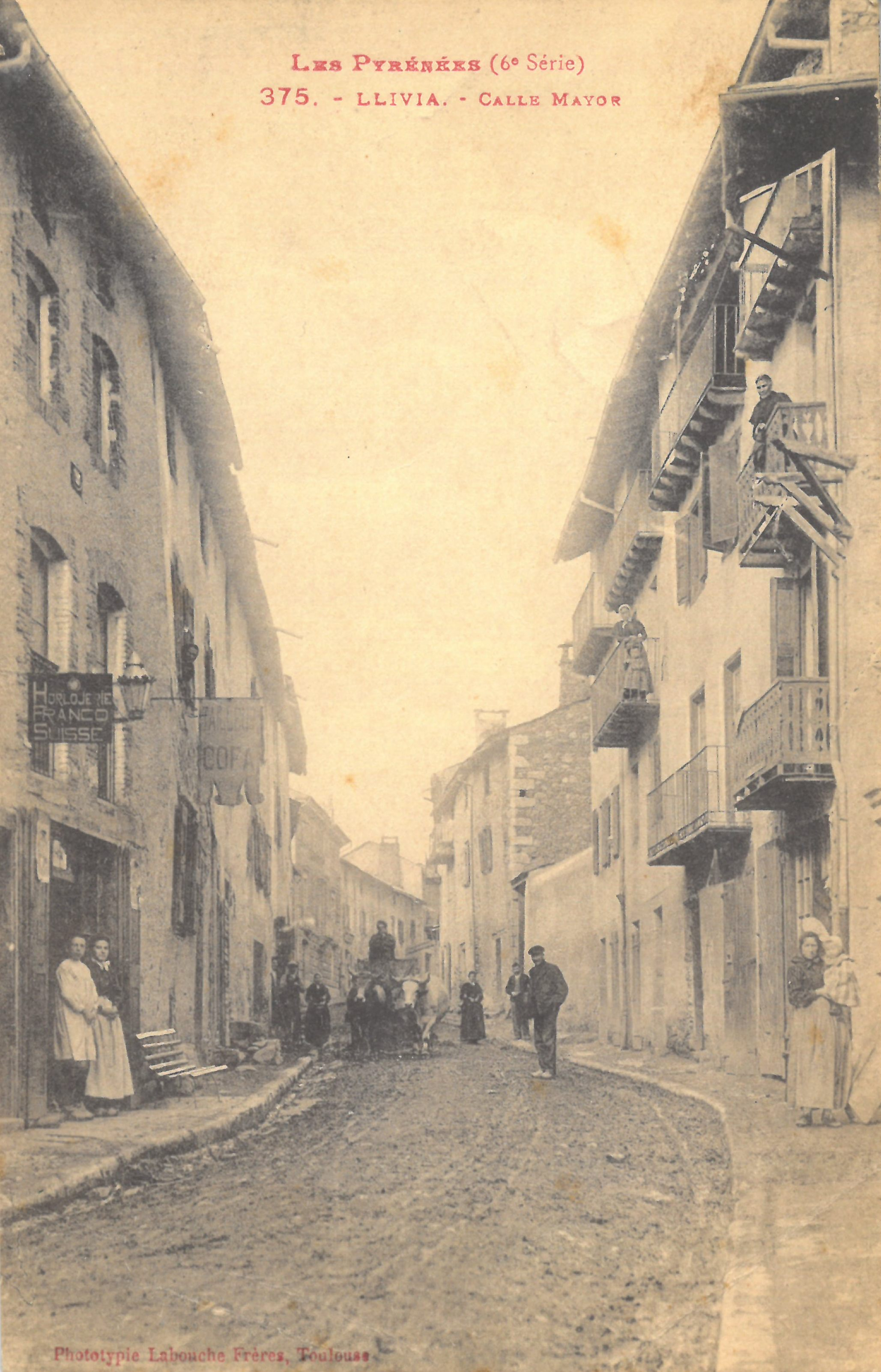
Frederic Bernades street, early 1900s

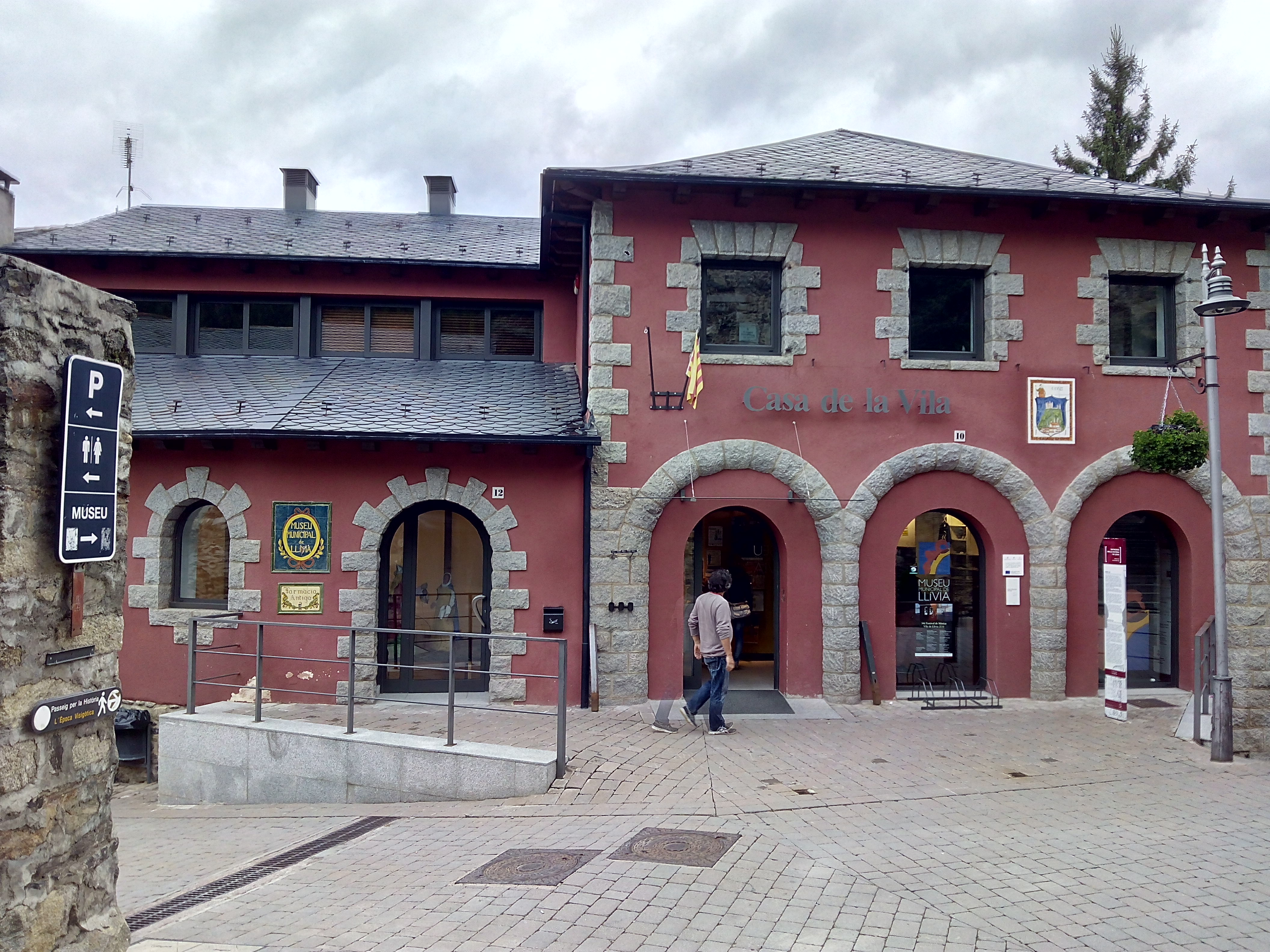
Esteve Pharmacy museum

Llívia (Catalan pronunciation: [ˈʎiβiə]; Spanish: Llivia Spanish: [ˈʎiβja]) is a town in the comarca of Cerdanya, province of Girona, Catalonia, Spain. It is a Spanish exclave surrounded by the French département of Pyrénées-Orientales. It is named after Livia, the wife of Augustus and matriarch of the Julio-Claudian dynasty. Because of a technicality in the Treaty of the Pyrenees, signed in 1659, that transferred only "villages" in the Pyrenees to France, Llívia, which was a "town", remains under Spanish control. The Segre river, a tributary of the Spanish Ebro, flows through Llívia. It has a population of 1,562 (register office, 2025).

Llívia is separated from the rest of Spain by a corridor approximately 1.6 km (1.0 mile) wide, which includes the French communes of Ur and Bourg-Madame. This corridor is traversed by a road, owned by both France (where it is part of Route nationale 20 and RD68) and Spain (where it is part of N-154). Before the implementation of the Schengen Area in 1995, it was considered a "neutral road", a custom-free route with access for both French and Spanish people; since 1995, there have been no formal borders. The two countries share a hospital in Puigcerdà (which lies close to Llívia), as well as other local initiatives.

Llívia is the site of the Esteve Pharmacy, in Llívia's municipal museum, which has a large albarello display as well as antique drugs and a collection of prescription books. It is also the site of Llívia castle, which is in ruins.

== History ==
Before Ancient Rome, Llívia was the site of an Iberian oppidum that commanded the region.

During the time of Ancient Rome, it was named after Livia, and was called Julia Lybica. It was the capital of Cerdanya until it was replaced by Hix, a commune of Bourg-Madame, France.

In 672, during the period of the Visigoths, its citadel, the castrum Libiae, was held by the rebel Flavius Paulus (Paul of Narbonne) against King Wamba.

In the 8th century, it may also have been the scene of the siege by which governor Abdul Rahman Al Ghafiqi of Muslim Spain rid himself of the Moorish (Berber) rebel Uthman ibn Naissa ("Munnuza"), who had allied himself with Duke Eudo of Aquitaine to improve the chances of his rebellion, ahead of the Battle of Tours (732 or 733), also known as the Battle of Poitiers.

In 1479, during the Catalan Civil War, Llívia castle was destroyed by the forces of Louis XI after fourteen months of siege.

Following the Franco-Spanish War (1635–1659), the Treaty of the Pyrenees in 1659 ceded the comarques of Roussillon, Conflent, Capcir, Vallespir, and northern Cerdanya ("Cerdagne") to the Kingdom of France and established the Pyrenees as the border between France and Spain. However, the treaty stipulated that only villages were to be ceded to France, and Llívia was considered a town (vila in Catalan), since it had the status of the ancient capital of Cerdanya. So Llívia remained a Spanish enclave within France. This situation was confirmed in the Treaty of Llívia, signed in 1660. The maps were not accurate and it was originally not obvious that Llívia would be an enclave. The borders were ratified in the Treaty of Bayonne in 1866.

Under the Nationalist government of Francisco Franco, residents required special passes to cross France to the rest of Spain.

After the Spanish Civil War, there were several initiatives to convert Llívia into a free republican territory.

The road connecting Llívia to the rest of Spain was the location of the war of the stop signs; stop signs were placed by the French authorities and removed overnight by protesters on many instances in the 1980s.

During the 2017 Catalan independence referendum, a vote on the Catalan declaration of independence, 561 out of 591 votes cast in Llívia were in favour of independence. The referendum was deemed illegal by the Spanish courts, but the Spanish police did not intervene to stop the vote in the town.

== Education ==
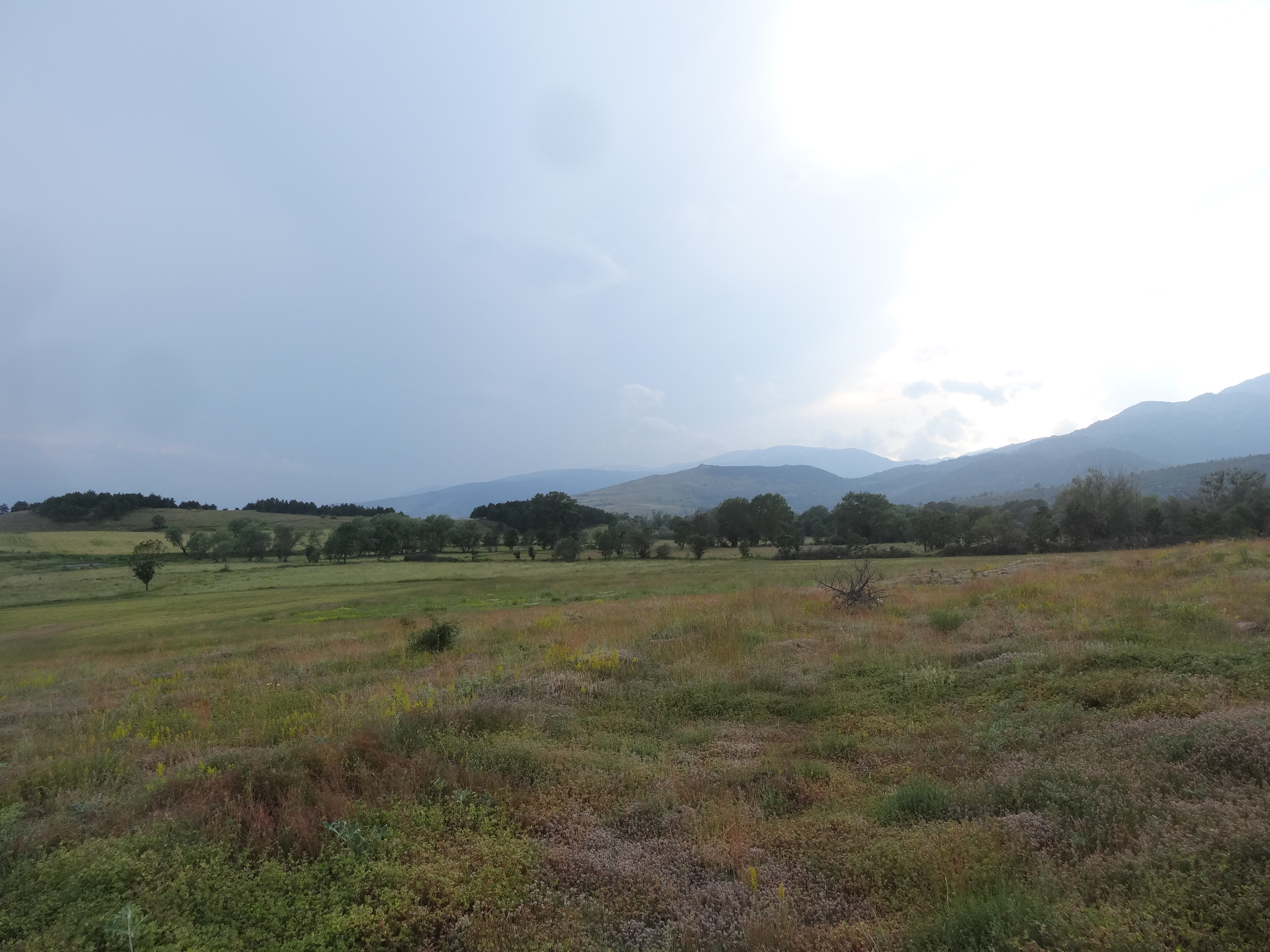
Serra de Portella prairie

Escola Jaume I is in Llívia. It was built in the 1950s.

In 2016, a school was constructed with a 500 m^{2} (5,400 sq ft) ground floor and a 250 m^{2} (2,700 sq ft) second floor.

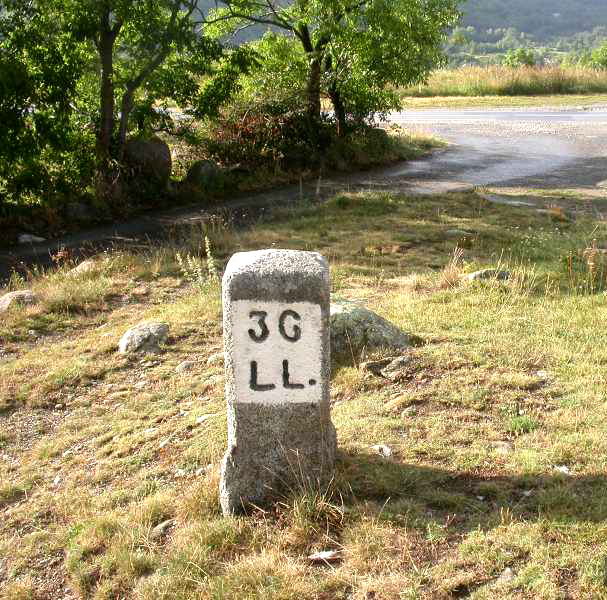
Boundary marker between Spain and France, for the municipalities of Llívia (Girona) and Angoustrine-Villeneuve-des-Escaldes (Pyrénées-Orientales)
