= War of the stop signs =

1970s-1995 Franco-Spanish border roads dispute

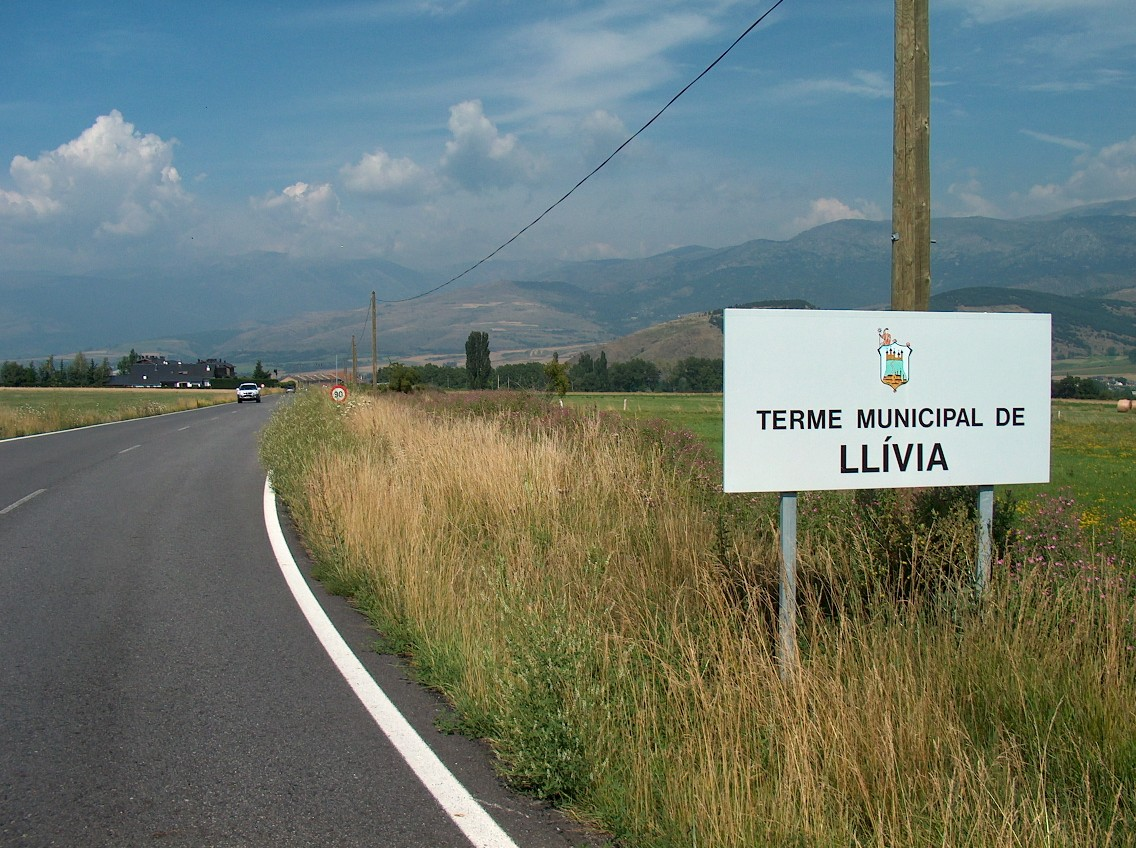
Llívia municipal boundary sign

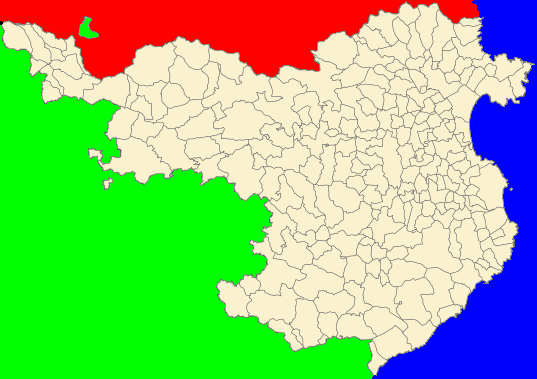
Llívia location (green) surrounded by French territory (red). In light color the rest of the Province of Girona and also in green the rest of the Spanish territory

The war of the stop signs (Catalan: La guerra dels Stops, Spanish: Guerra de los stops, French: Guerre des Stops) was a dispute regarding the N-154 (Spain) / D-68 (France) road that connects the town and Spanish exclave of Llívia with Puigcerdà (Spanish border city next to France) between the early 1970s and the 1980s.

Llívia is a Spanish town in the province of Girona, Catalonia, which has been completely surrounded by French territory since 1660 (Treaty of the Pyrenees). In 1866, the third Bayonne Treaty established that the path (now road) that connected Llívia with Puigcerdà was of "free movement" to ease the crossing to some grazing lands the town owns inside French territory.

In the early 1970s, the French government installed stop signs on the road, forcing traffic to stop and yield to the French roads. The Spanish residents repeatedly tore down the stop signs, stating that they violated the "free movement" of the road that the treaty established. Finally, in the early 1980s, the Spanish government financed the construction of a bridge over one of the French roads. The French government changed the priority rules of the second crossing so the oncoming road had to yield to the N-154/D-68. This second crossing now has a roundabout.

Only cars with a Spanish registration plate could use the Llívia to Puigcerdà road until 1995, when the Schengen Treaty provided for unrestricted movement between the two countries.
