= Albarello =

Type of concave-sided drug jar

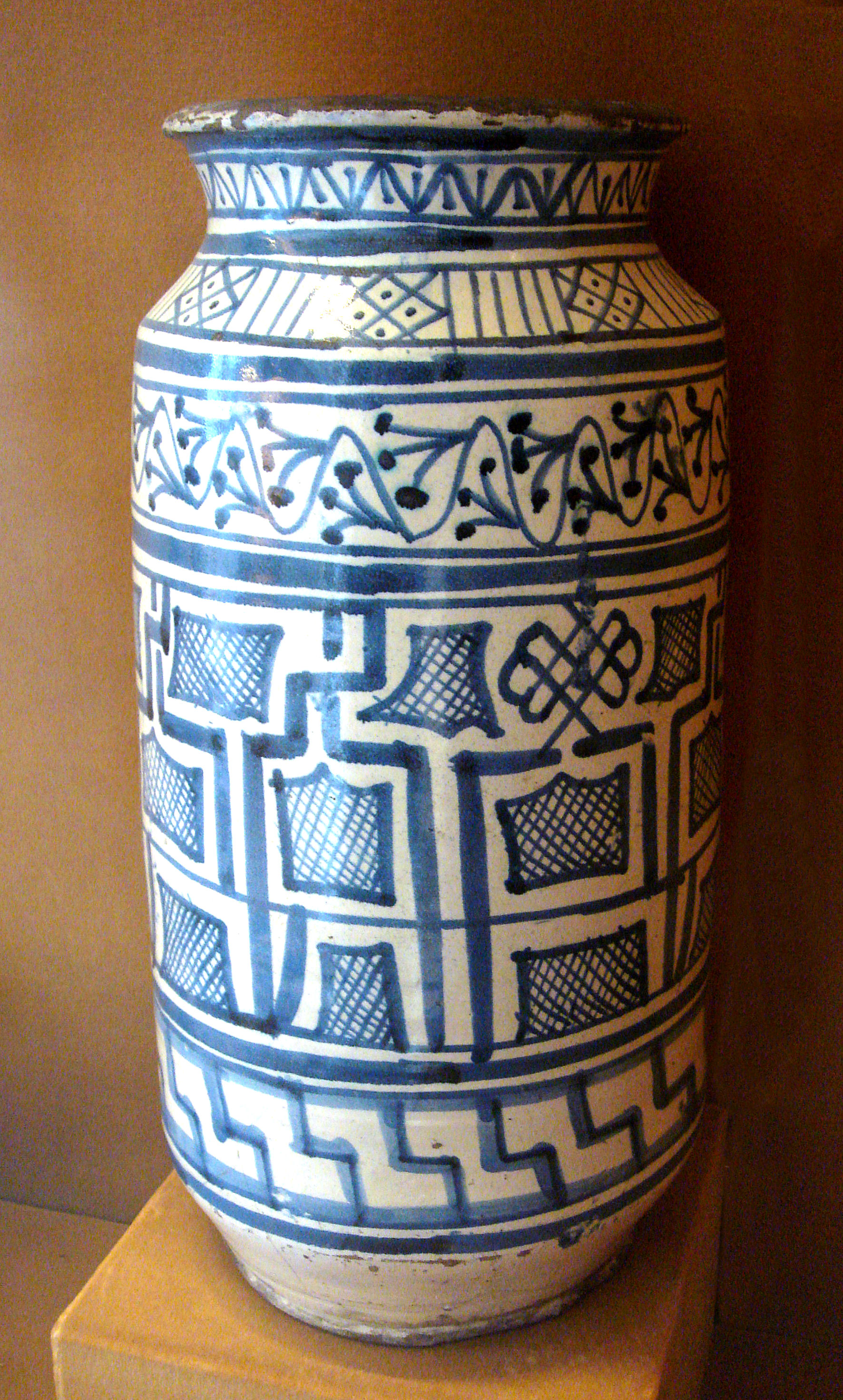
Blue and white albarello adorned with the traditional colours of Chinese Porcelain and decorated with designs derived from Kufic script, a style of Arabic script. Manufactured in Tuscany, Italy, in the second half of the 15th century.

An albarello (a name of Italian descent, plural: albarelli) is also known as a "maiolica drug jar" because of the type of tin glaze used, known as maiolica (also known as majolica). This cylindrical storage unit is used for a plethora of purposes, most commonly for drug storage in pharmacies as a medicinal jar. The jar was also used for other purposes such as storing dried fruit, herbs, balms, and apothecaries' ointments and dry drugs.

== Function ==
People usually stored their albarelli in buildings with medical purposes, like pharmacies, hospitals, and doctors' offices. Such jars served both functional and decorative purposes in traditional apothecaries and pharmacies, and represented status and wealth. The jars were generally sealed with a piece of parchment or leather tied with a piece of cord. Hospitals often used albarelli to hold products such as ointments, balms, and different remedies for patients. Albarelli were also utilised in ways other than their originally intended purpose, including holding perfume, as a form of décor, and as vases to display flowers.

== Etymology ==
According to the Oxford English Dictionary, the Italian word albarello means "a decorated ceramic pharmacy jar of a cylindrical shape with a slight constriction halfway up (first used in 1344 as alberello; and then later, in the late 15th century as albarello), but the term's exact origin and etymology remains a topic for a debate. Some scholars argue that its etymology suggests that it derives either from the post-classical Latin word albarus meaning "white poplar" or the Classical Latin word albus meaning white. However, the poplar tree itself is not being compared to the jar, as the Italian usage of the word albarello for a white poplar tree came long after the naming of the albarello jar. The issue has further been muddled because some have claimed that these jars were originally manufactured in wood, even though there is no physical evidence of this in recovered materials and surviving jars. Another possible origin of the term lies in another related Classical Latin word albaris ("whitish") and another Classical Latin term albarius referencing its relation to a whitewashing vessel. Both albaris and albarius are recorded only as adjectives, i.e., "of or relating to stucco," and therefore do not have usage in relation to pottery or pottery glazes.

Another etymology links albarello to the Arabic al-barani/al-baraniyya, which refers to a type of jar or container

== Importation from China and the Middle East ==
The origin of this type of pharmacy jar has its roots in the Middle East during the time of the Islamic conquests. The term majolica specifically refers to a type of tin glaze that originated in the Near East along Islamic trade routes, showcasing the strong influence of Islamic material culture. The characteristic shape of the arbarello also has its roots in the East. Additionally, Chinese porcelain and its manufacturing played a significant role in influencing the development and spread of arbarelli across Europe. The influence from the Islamic empire coupled with the manufacturing of Chinese porcelain made for mass manufacture and subsequent exportation of albarelli for several cultures including those in Italy, China, and Spain, and in turn were re-purposed for differing needs.

Spanning out of the East from the Islamic empires and China, the albarelli were first introduced to Europe in Syria and Spain and then brought to Italy by Muslim Arab traders, during the height of the Italian Renaissance where its shape and purpose was adopted. By importing majolica from Spain and Syria, Italian artists began producing versions of their own that differed from the traditional Islamic arbarelli with the addition of handles to heighten the functionality of the jar and the introduction of new designs including "a trofei" (with trophies), "a foglie" (leafy designs), and "a frutti" (decorated with fruits). While the styles in both Spain and Italy kept on developing, clear influence could still be linked backed to traditional Chinese and Islamic ceramic designs despite the changes in style and designs. Eventually Syrian manufacture of the jars lead to them being described in Italian as "porcellana domaschina" (damascene porcelain), to distinguish that the blue-and-white lusterware were made in Damascus and were not authentic Chinese porcelain that had been imported into Europe previously.

== Characteristics ==
Albarelli are known for having a cylindrical shape without handles and a thin neck to make them easy to handle and move. Albarelli are usually made out of majolica, which has helped historians decipher the history between the albarelli, due to it being such a resistant and strong material. In later forms after it spread throughout Europe, their design included the addition of handles that were adopted by the Italians after the 15th century. On average, albarelli were recorded to be 18–20 cm (7–8 in) in height. Instead of having a fitted lid to cover the opening at the top, people would use a fitted paper to lay on top to seal it.

== Geographic styles ==
=== Spanish Renaissance ===
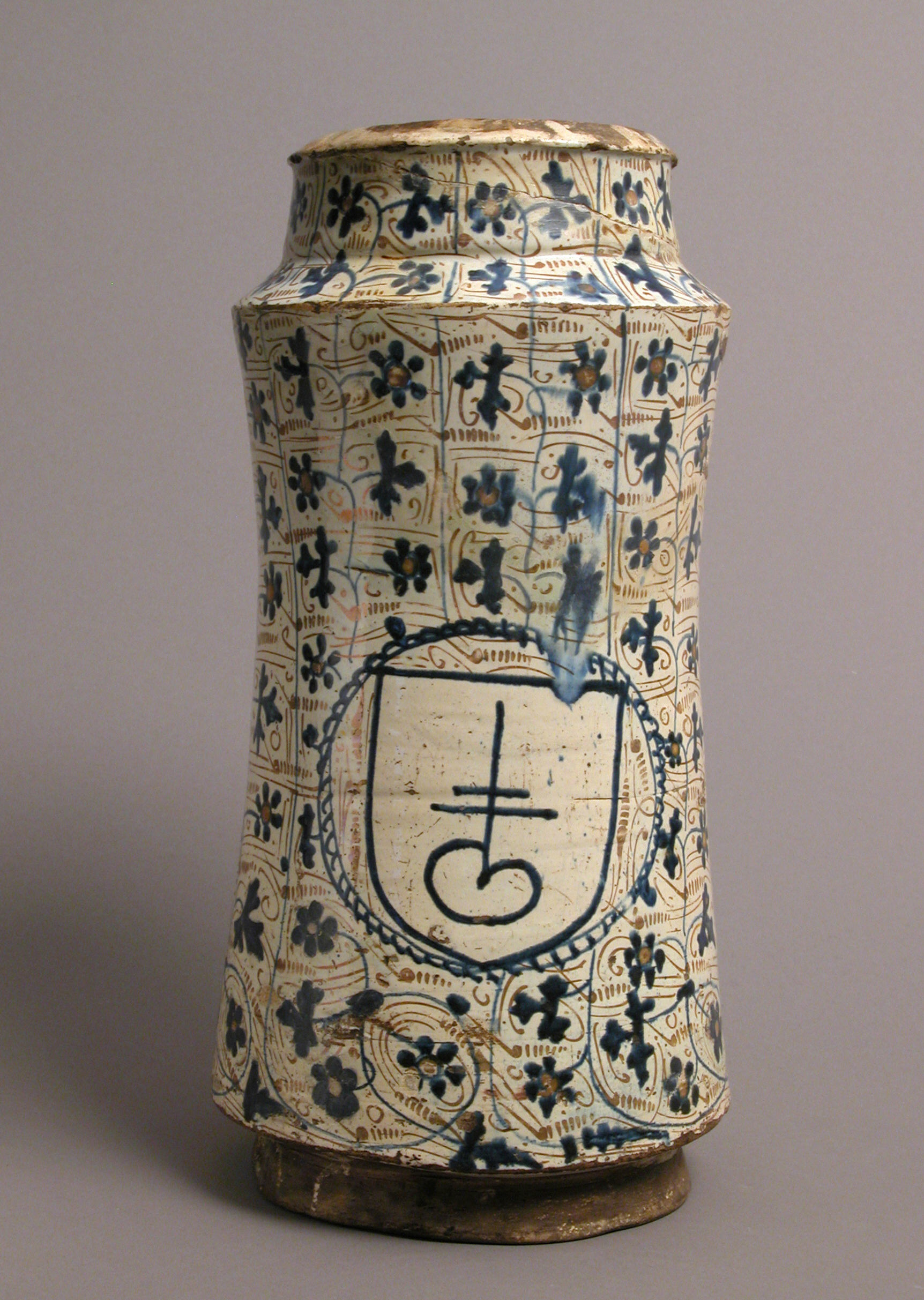
16th century Spanish Albarello with a symbol in the middle of the vase, marking it as a pharmacy jar for some powder.

Spain was introduced to Albarelli by the East, it was adopted quickly. They are known to have the same cylindrical shape, with a more narrow opening, and an indented base where artists usually sign their name. Albarelli were also labelled through the symbols on the outside and through parchment paper in the vase.

=== Italian Renaissance ===
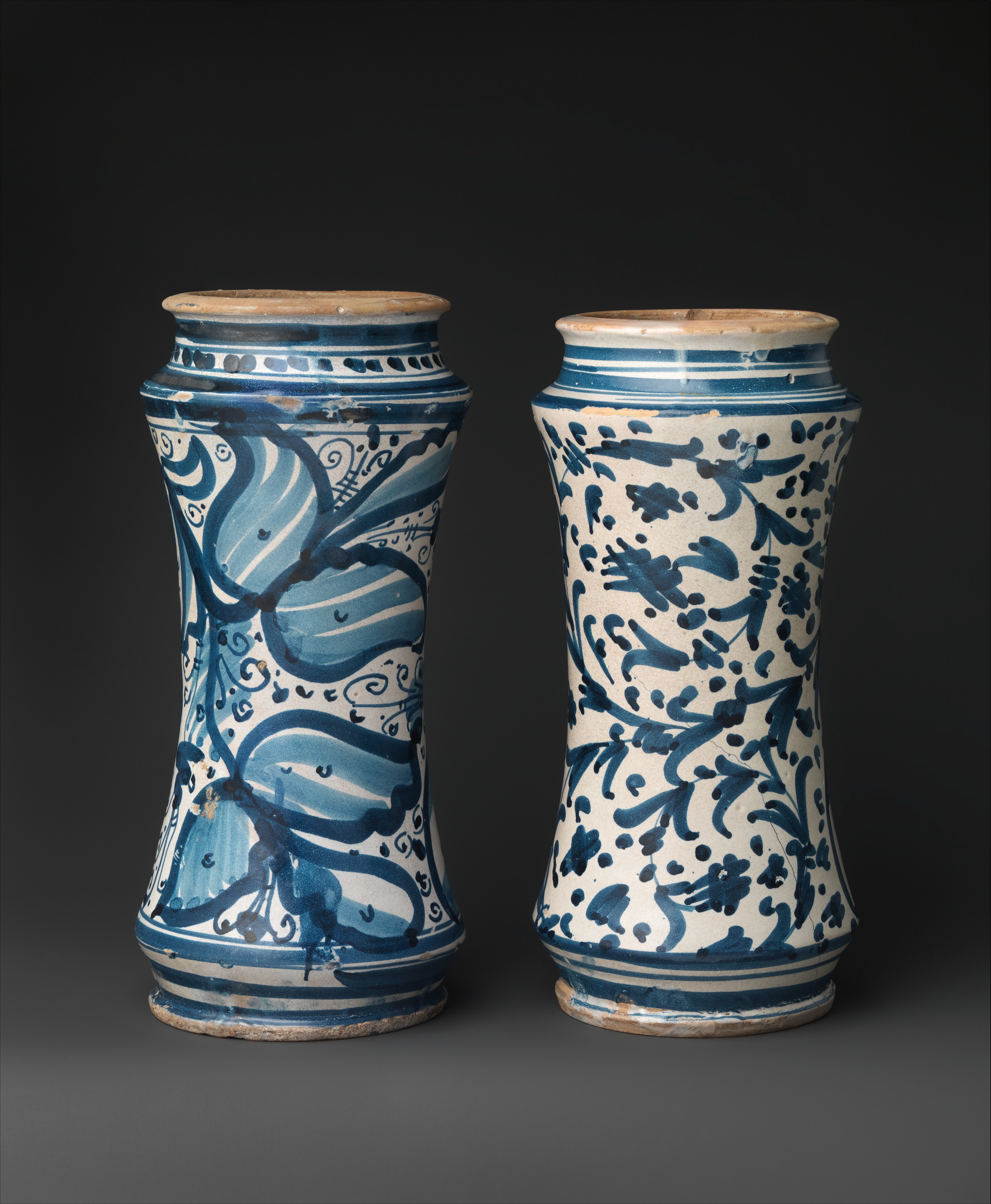
Two albarelli fashioned with a prominent Italian motif called "a foglie" or leafy design. Most likely manufactured in the Naples district. Located at the Metropolitan Museum of Art in the European Sculpture and Decorative Arts collection.

The earliest Italian examples were produced in Florence in the 15th century. Albarelli were made in Italy from the first half of the 15th century through to the late 18th century and beyond. Italian-based albarelli are commonly measured to be 18–20 cm (7–8 in) in height. Italian albarelli adopted its shape from lustreware from Islamic Spain. Unlike English albarelli, Italian-based pots had flat edges on the rims to account for the placement of a paper cover that functioned as a lid. There was a lot of Oriental inspiration when making these jars, noticed through the blue and white colours on majority of the pots, also referred to as alla porcellana, which means in the form of imported Chinese porcelain, "a trofei" meaning with trophies, "a foglie" meaning leafy designs, and "a frutti" meaning decorated with fruits. Further designs include floral motifs against a white background, to more elaborate designs such as portraits of a cherub or priest, and can include a label describing the contents of the jar. Specific styles of decoration are now associated with various Italian locations, including Florence, Venice, Gerace and Palermo in Sicily.

== Gallery ==
Middle Eastern and Islamic styles

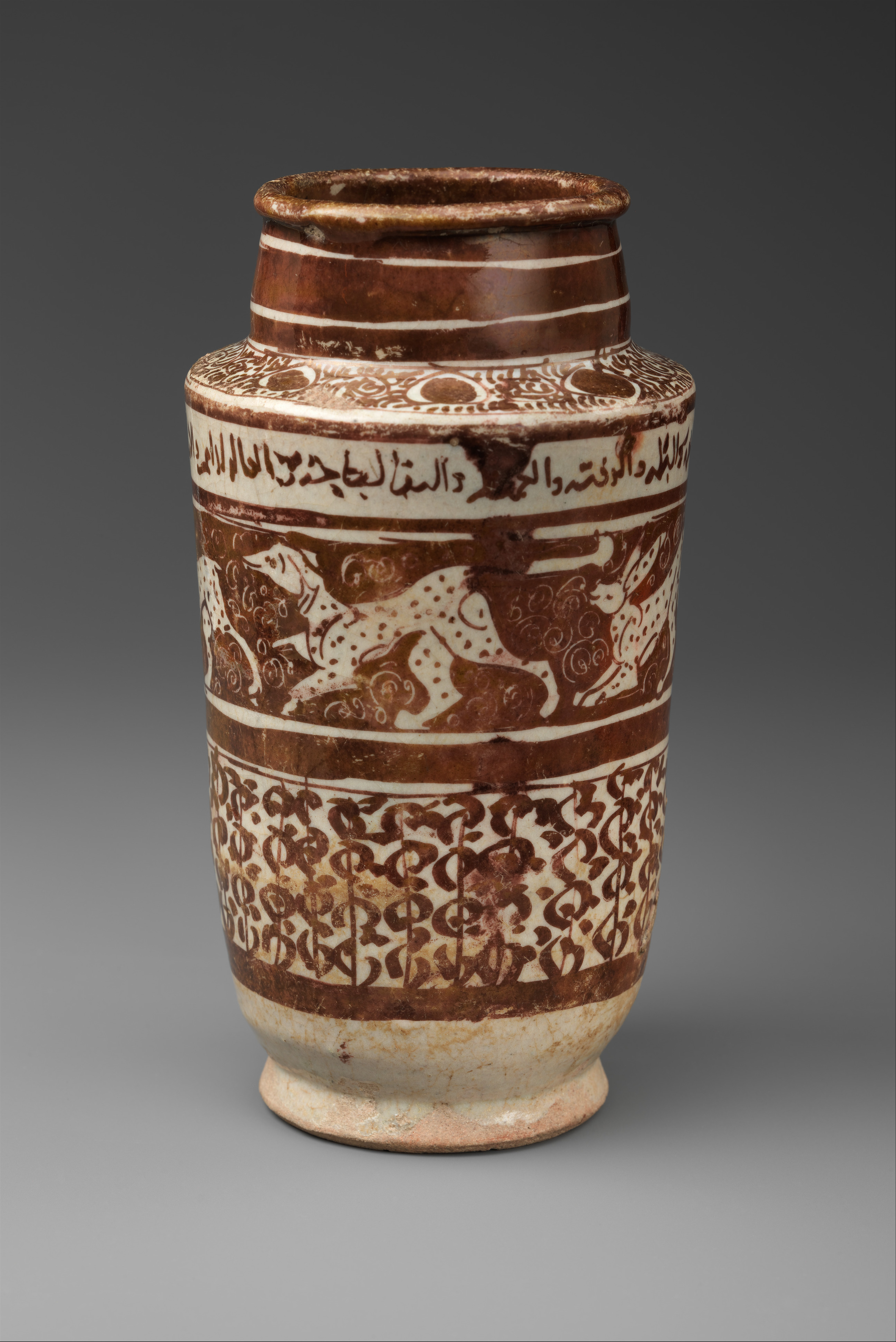
Albarello jar found in Iran in the 12th century. Has Arabic religious text around the jar, as well as animals running in action.

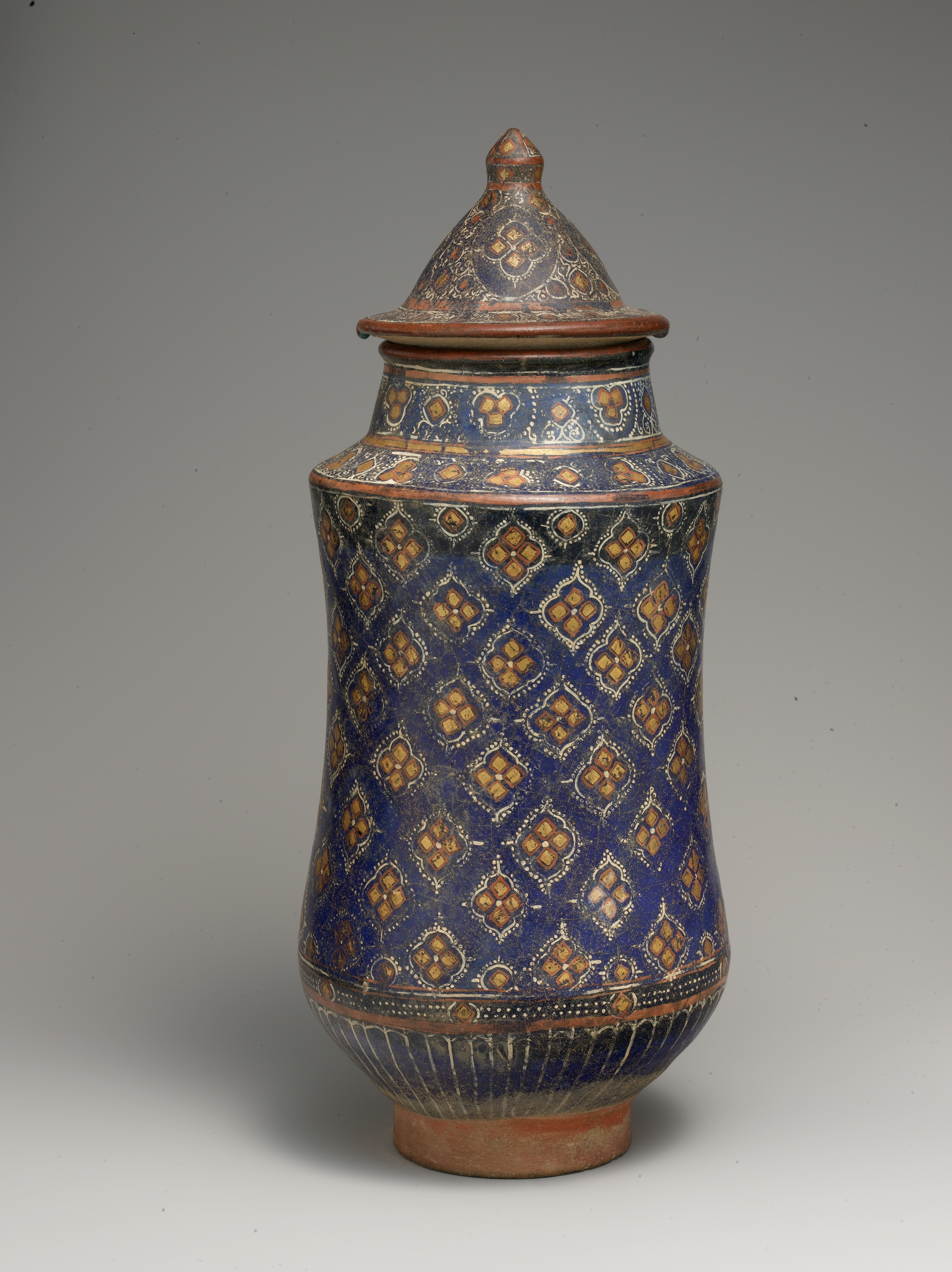
Albarello jar with lid. Manufactured in the second half of the 13th to early 14th century. Located at the Metropolitan Museum of Art in the Islamic Art collection.

Spanish styles

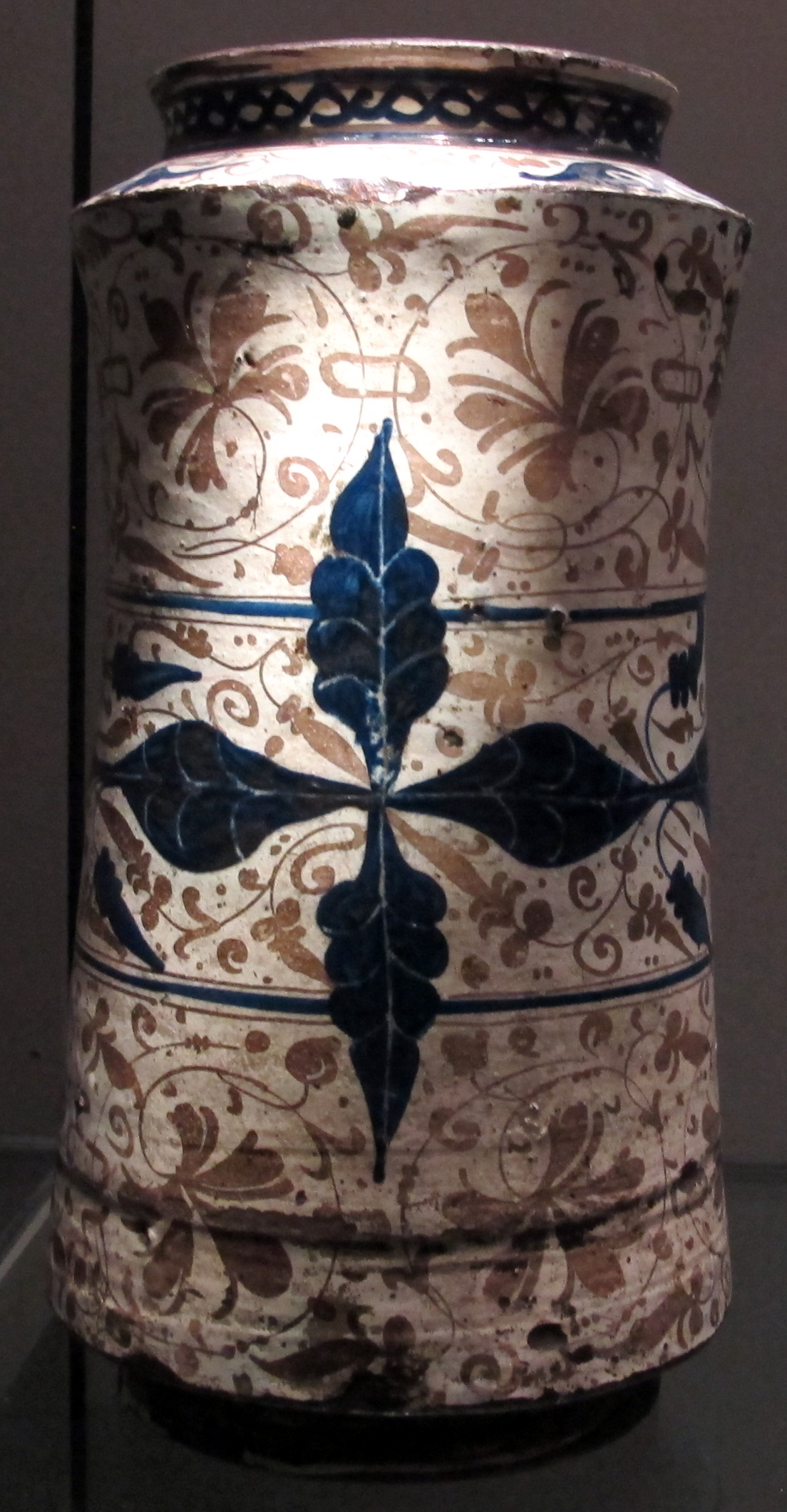
Manises albarello with lustre decoration, 1430s, Louvre

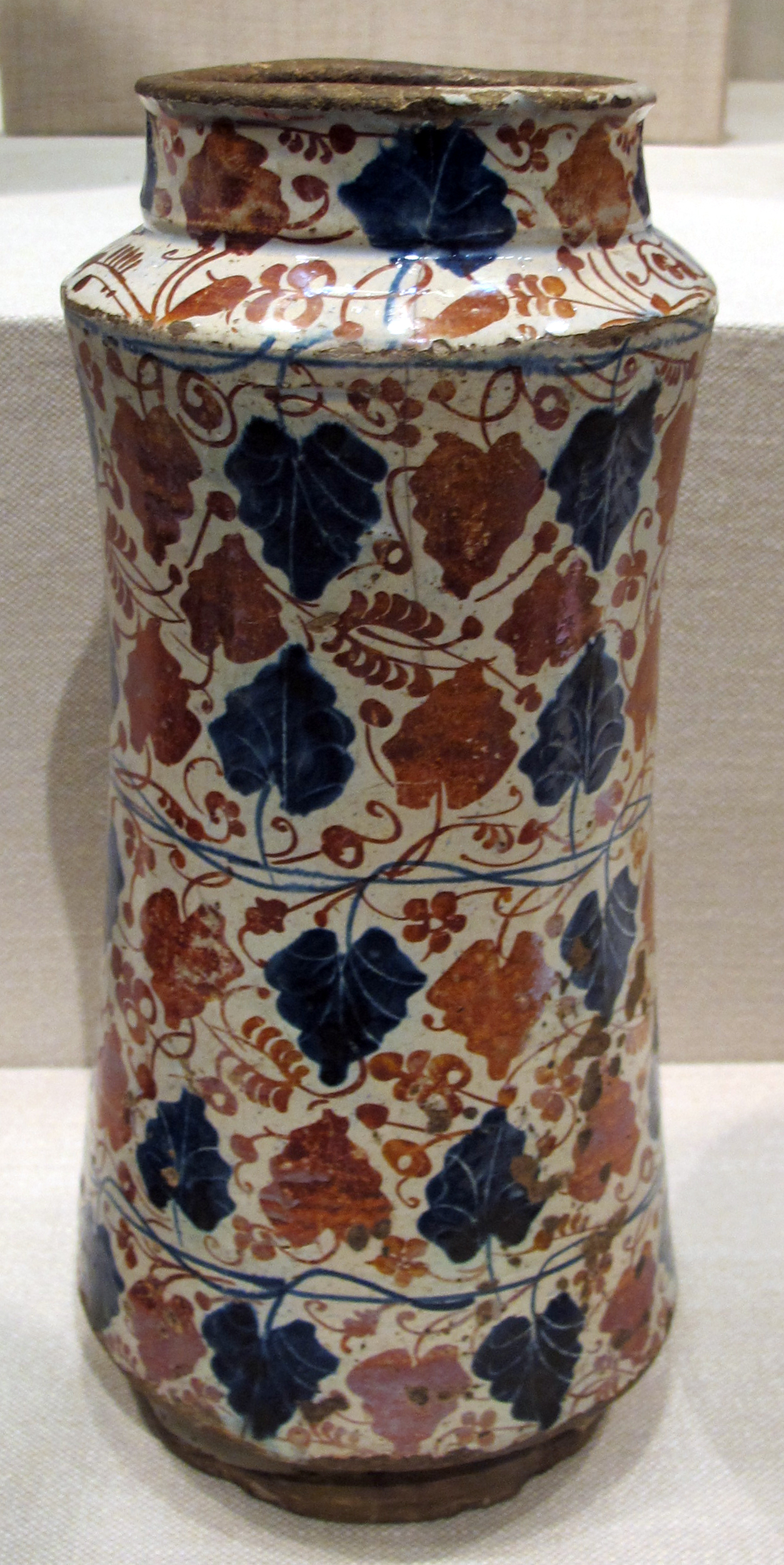
Manises albarello decorated with grapevine tendrils, 15th century, Metropolitan Museum of Art. A similar vase is depicted in the Portinari Triptych di Hugo van der Goes

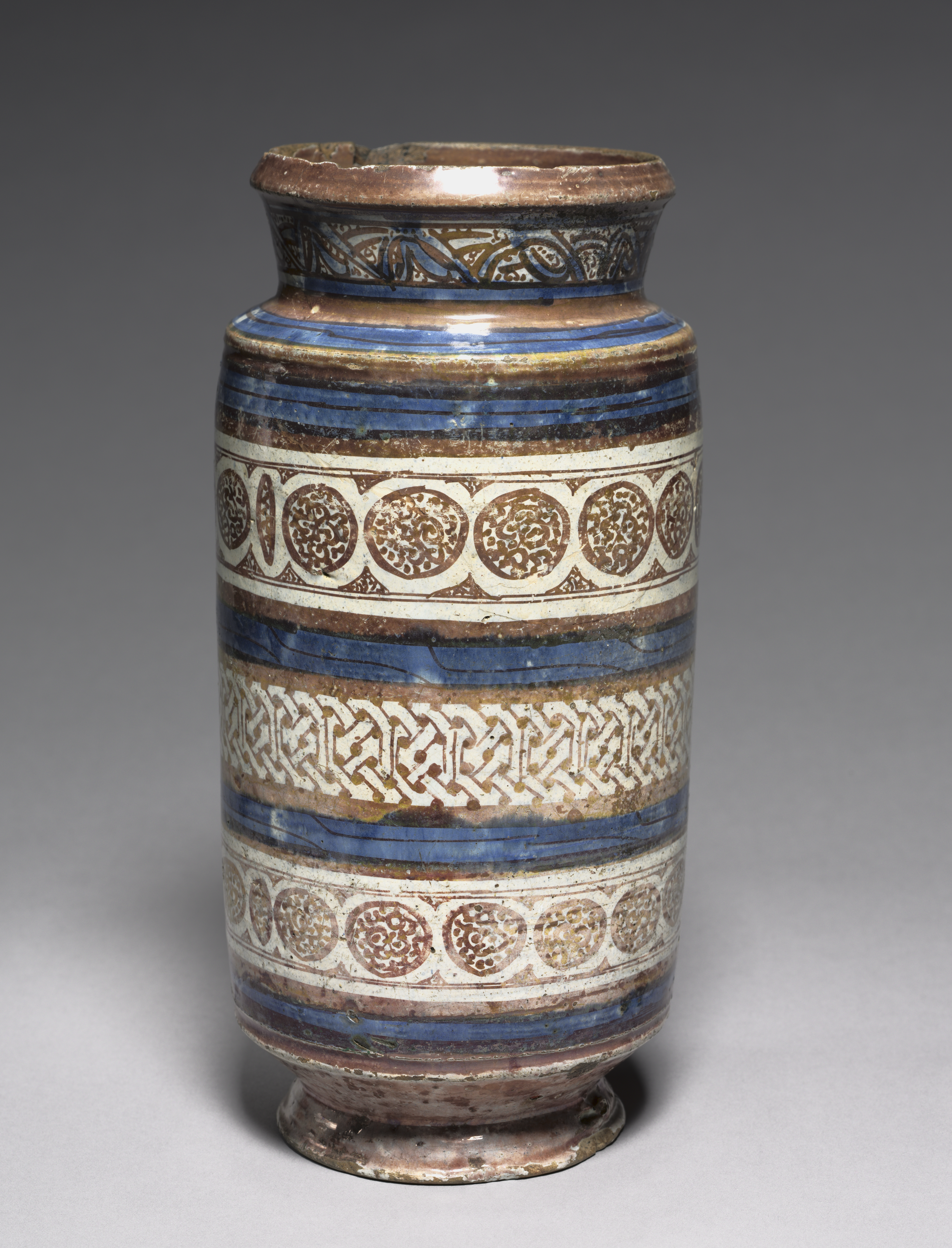
Design influenced by contemporary Islamic designs due to the Muslim occupied Spain at the time of its creation 1400-1420, Cleveland Museum of Art

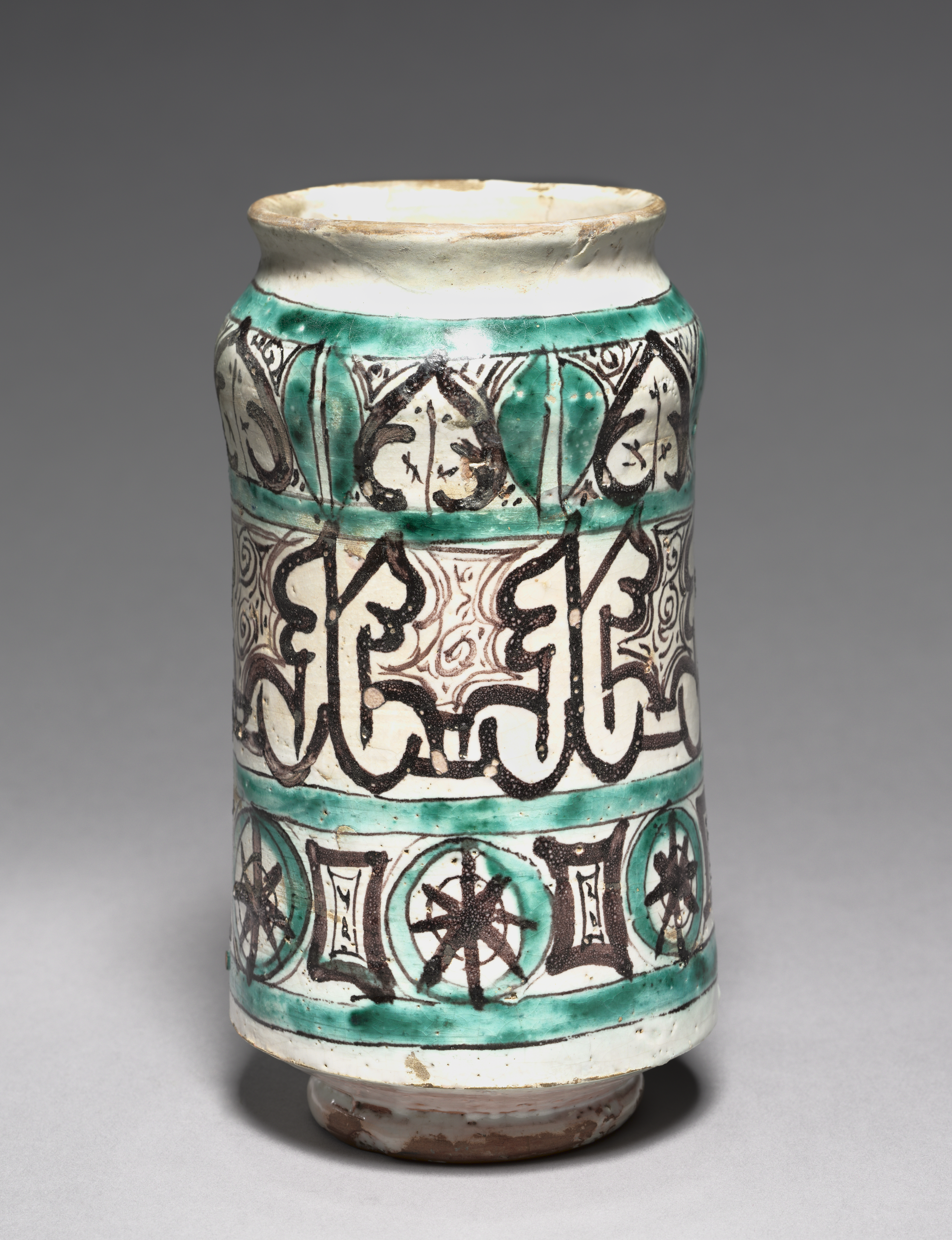
Jar with Pseudo-Kufic Lettering (imitation Arabic style lettering) adorning the outside. The Muslim occupation of Spain allowed for great influence of art, including ceramic decorations. Manufactured in Paterna, Spain in the 14th century, Metropolitan Museum of Art

Italian styles

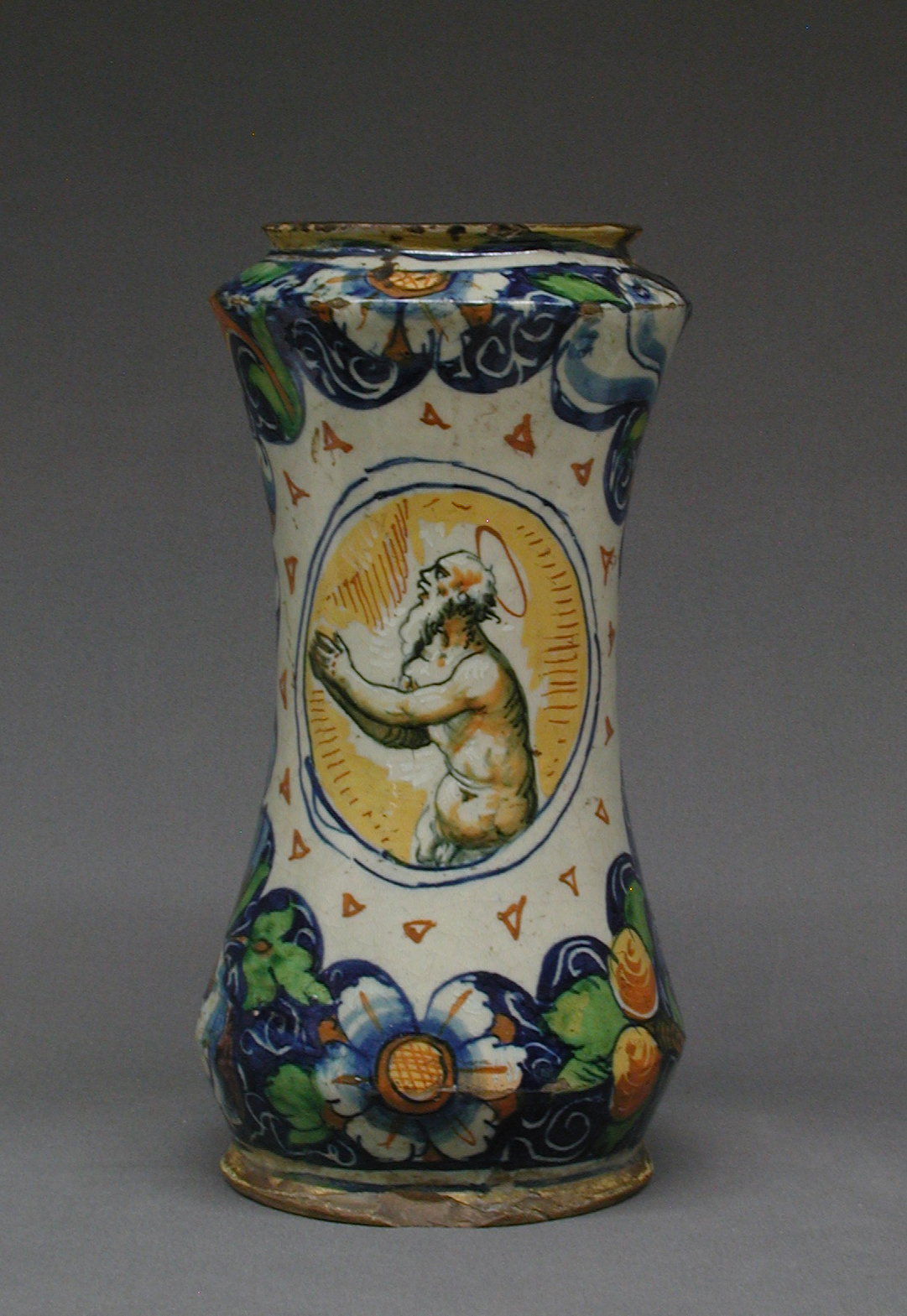
Decorated with Italian motifs including a colourful floral design against a white background and a portrait of a heavenly being also known as a cherub, second half of the 16th century, Metropolitan Museum of Art

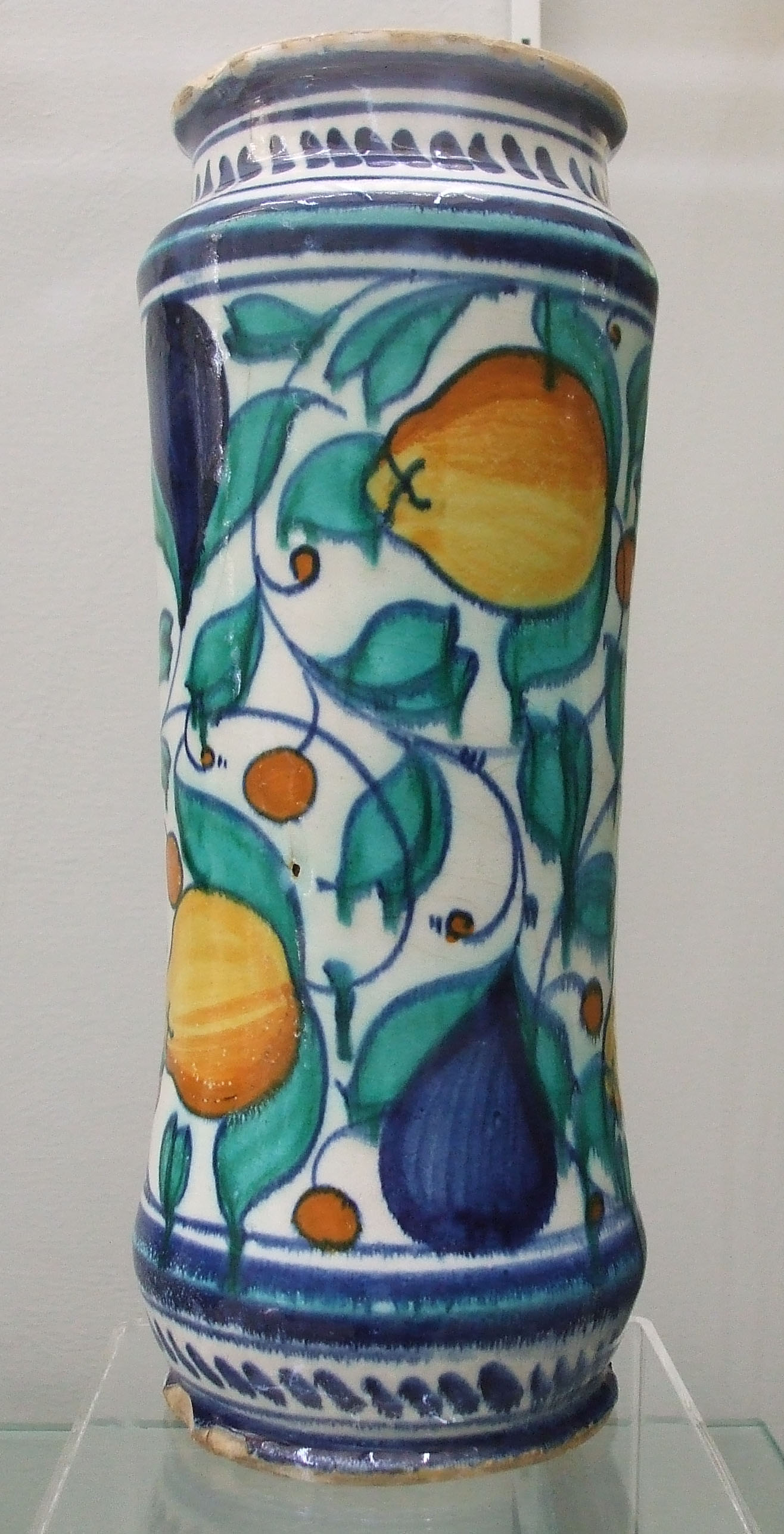
Decorated with an Italian motif known as "a frutti" or decorated with fruits, 16th century, the Burrell Collection.

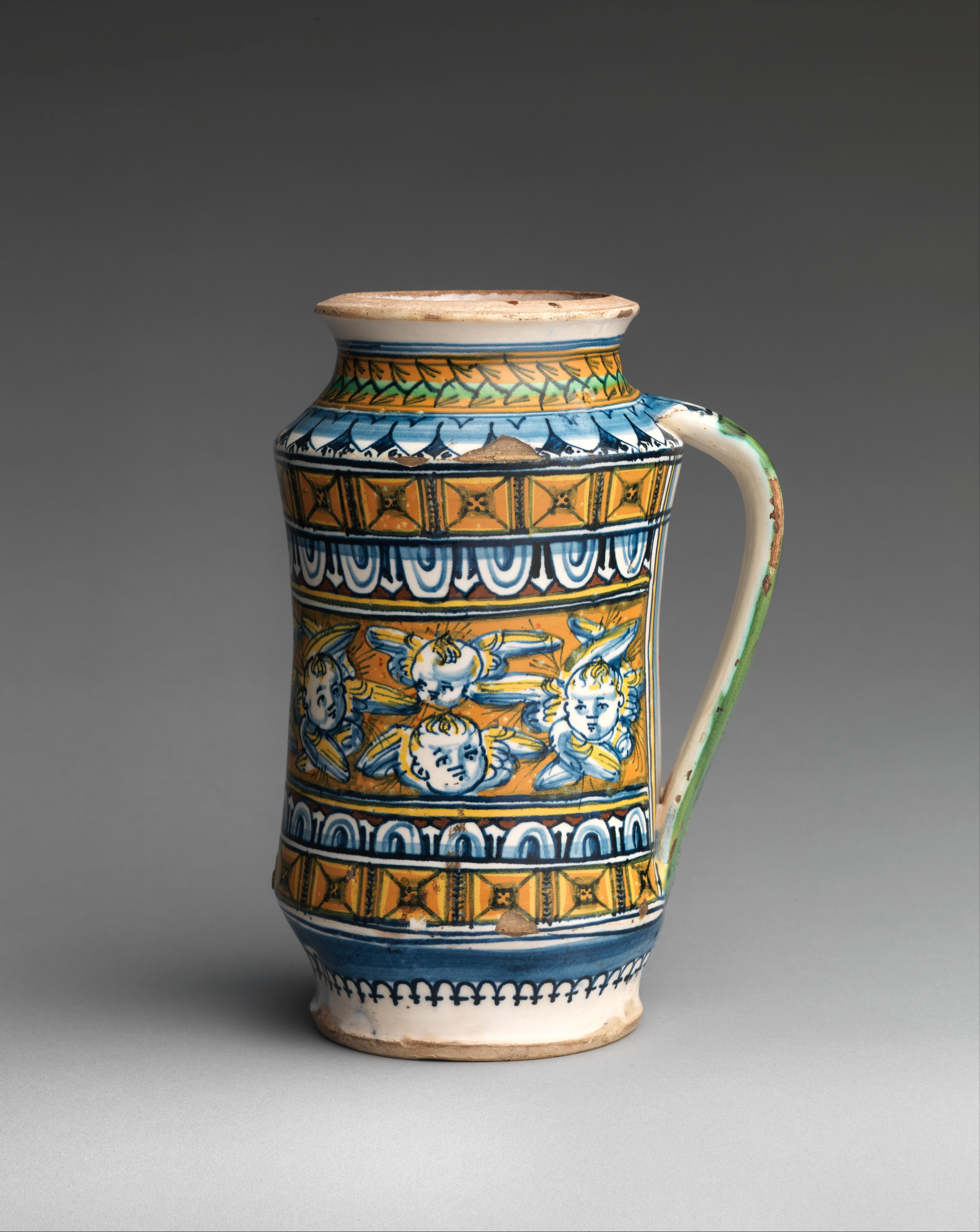
Fashioned with one handle and decorated with multiple cherubs as seen through the middle of the jars exterior, 1510-1530, Metropolitan Museum of Art

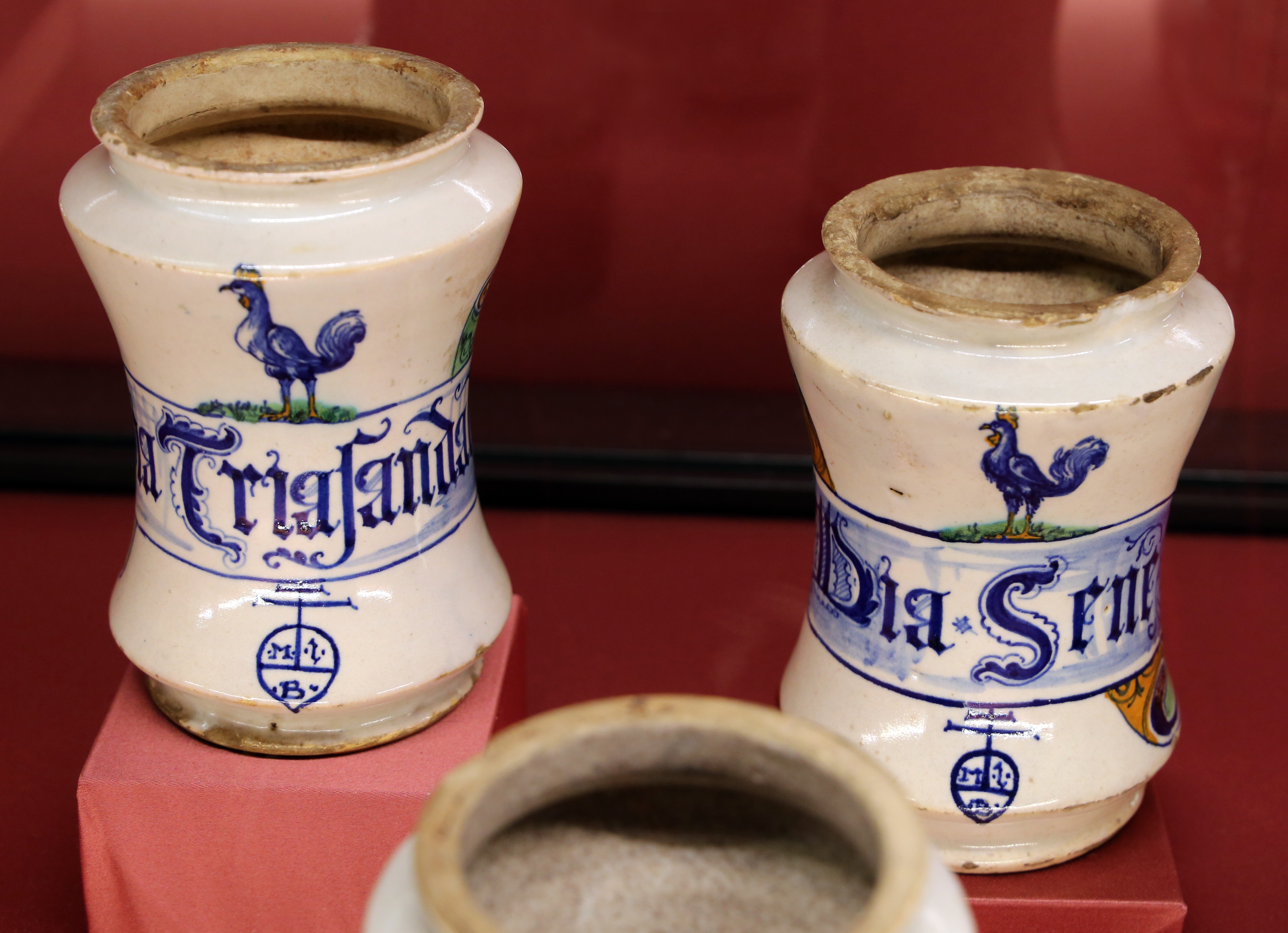
Pharmacy Albarelli, made in casteldurante, Italy, in the first half of 16th century, Museo Bardini, Florence

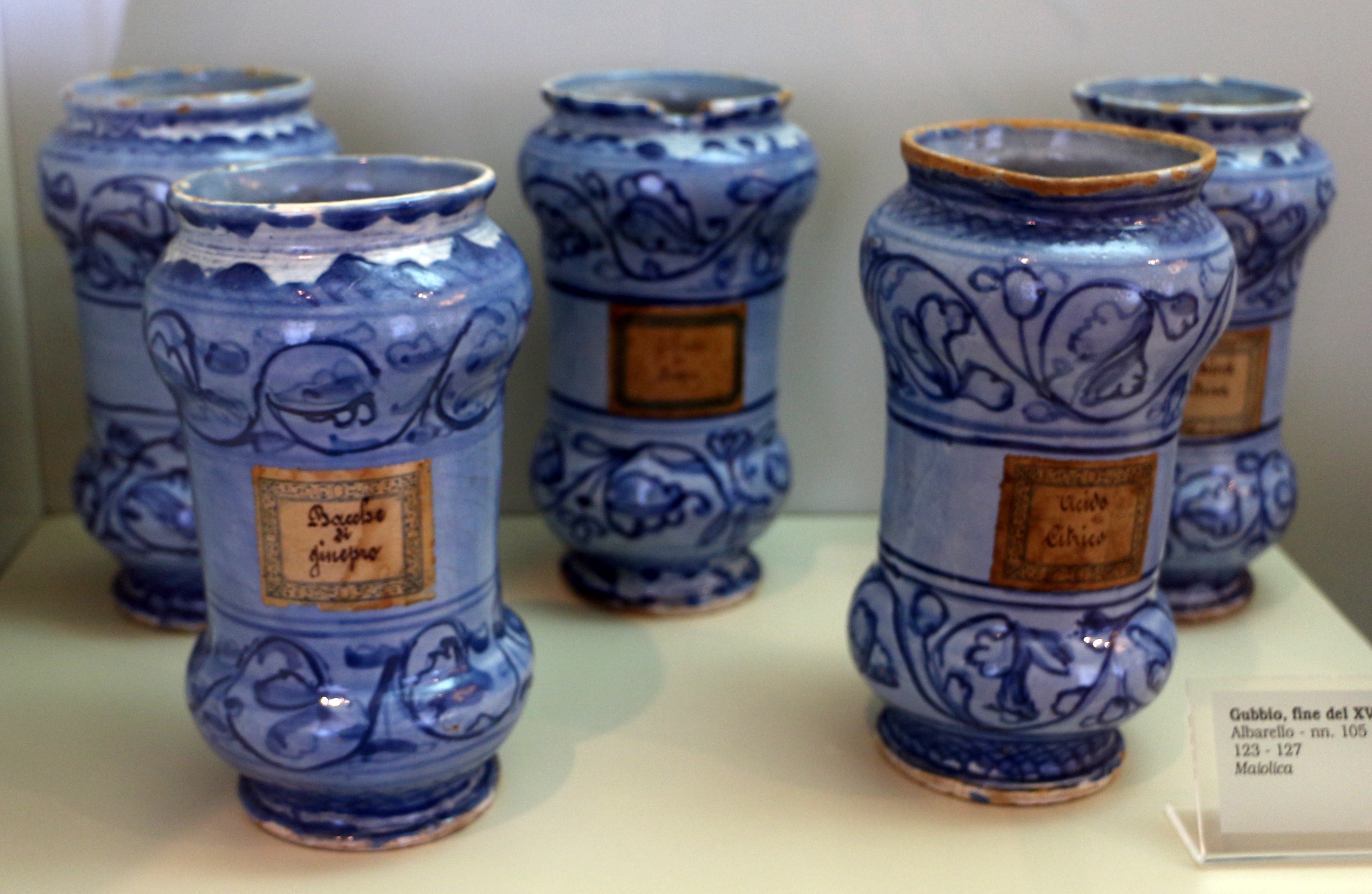
Albarelli produced in Gubbio, Umbria, in 1690s, Civic Museum of Gubbio

== See also ==
- Blue albarellos of the Esteve Pharmacy
- Islamic world contributions to Medieval Europe
