= Susanne Engstrøm =

Danish pharmaconomist (born 1949)

Susanne Engstrøm (born 1949) is a Danish pharmaconomist and has since 1989 been the president of The Danish Association of Pharmaconomists (Danish: Farmakonomforeningen).

Engstrøm is a board member of Pharmakon—Danish College of Pharmacy Practice. Engstrøm is also president of the Work Environment Council of the FTF – Confederation of Professionals in Denmark.

Engstrøm lives in Gentofte and has a part-time job as a pharmaconomist (medical-pharmaceutical consultant) at the Vaisenhus Pharmacy in Copenhagen.
