= Professional Further Education in Clinical Pharmacy and Public Health =

Professional Further Education in Clinical Pharmacy and Public Health (Danish: Faglig videreuddannelse i Klinisk farmaci og Folkesundhed) is a Danish professional postgraduate higher further education for Danish pharmaconomists (experts in pharmaceuticals).

The education programme is developed by Pharmakon—Danish College of Pharmacy Practice, the Danish Association of Pharmaconomists and the Danish Pharmaceutical Association. The further education takes place at Pharmakon—Danish College of Pharmacy Practice in Hillerød, Denmark.

The admission requirement is a Danish pharmaconomist degree diploma granted by Pharmakon—Danish College of Pharmacy Practice. The education corresponds to 30 ECTS credits that are equivalent to ½ year of full-time study for a Clinical Pharmacy and Public Health Student. The education programme can be taken as a part-time further education over two to four years. Nevertheless, the education must be completed within 6 years.

The purpose of the Professional Further Education in Clinical Pharmacy and Public Health is to qualify each pharmaconomist (expert in pharmaceuticals) to practice clinical pharmacy at a higher and more professional level. The education consists of five modules:

- Module 1: Anatomy, physiology and biochemistry — 4 ECTS credits
- Module 2: Pathology and microbiology — 4 ECTS credits
- Module 3: Pharmacology — 4 ECTS credits
- Module 4: Public health and Communication Studies — 9 ECTS credits
- Module 5: Clinical pharmacy and pharmacotherapy — 9 ECTS credits

The total fee for the entire education programme amounts to 170,000 DKK (31,000 USD or 18,200 GBP).

== Sources and external links ==
- Information about the education by the Danish Association of Pharmaconomists (in Danish)
- Information about the education by Pharmakon—Danish College of Pharmacy Practice (in Danish)
