= Pharmaconomist =

Danish qualification like BPharm

In Denmark (including Greenland and Faroe Islands), pharmaconomists (Danish: farmakonom) are experts in pharmaceuticals (Danish: lægemiddelkyndig) who have trained with a 3-year tertiary degree. Pharmaconomy (Danish: farmakonomi) describes either their professional practice or their training courses.

== Work ==
The majority of the Danish pharmaconomists work at community pharmacies (chemists' shops or drug stores) and at hospital pharmacies and hospitals.

Some pharmaconomists work within the chemical industry, the pharmaceutical industry and in medical or clinical laboratories.

Other pharmaconomists teach pharmacy students and pharmaconomy students at colleges or universities, such as at the University of Copenhagen's Faculty of Health and Medical Sciences or at the Pharmakon—Danish College of Pharmacy Practice.

Pharmaconomists are also employed by the Danish Ministry of Interior and Health, Danish Medicines Agency and Danish Association of Pharmacies.

Some pharmaconomists do work as pharmaceutical consultants.

== Education ==
The 3 year higher education corresponds to 180 ECTS points (European Credit Transfer and Accumulation System).

=== Pharmakon—Danish College of Pharmacy Practice ===
During his or her education programme at Pharmakon—Danish College of Pharmacy Practice, the pharmaconomist student studies human and animal anatomy, physiology, pathology, pharmacology, pharmaconomy, pharmacy practice, pharmaceutics, toxicology, pharmacognosy, clinical pharmacy, pharmacotherapy, pharmaceutical sciences, chemistry, pharmaceutical chemistry, biochemistry, biology, microbiology, molecular biology, genetics, cytology, medicine, veterinary medicine, zoology, diagnosis, medical prescription, pharmacy law, medical sociology, patient safety, health care, psychology, psychiatry, pedagogy, communication, information technology (IT), bioethics, medical ethics, safety, leadership, organization, logistics, economy, quality assurance (QA), sales and marketing.

== Difference between a pharmaconomist and a pharmacist ==
There are two different professional groups with pharmaceutical education in Denmark:

- Pharmaconomists (with a 3-year higher tertiary education)
- Pharmacists (with a 5-year higher tertiary education)

Due to his or her higher education as a health professional, the pharmaconomist has by law the same independent competence in all Danish pharmacies as a pharmacist — i.e. for example to dispense and check medical prescriptions, to counsel and advise patients/customers about the use of medicine/pharmaceuticals and to dispense, sell and provide information about medical prescriptions and about prescription medicine and over-the-counter medicine (OTC).

The pharmaconomist also undertakes specialist and managerial operation of pharmacies and undertakes managerial duty service.

The only difference by law is that only a pharmacist may own a Danish pharmacy — i.e. become a pharmacy owner.

Like pharmacists, pharmaconomists can work as pharmacy managers and HR managers (or as chief pharmaconomists).

== Trade union ==
The Danish Association of Pharmaconomists is a trade union who represents about 5,700 pharmaconomists in Denmark (i.e. 98% of all Danish pharmaconomists).

== Translation into other languages ==
The Danish title farmakonom (pharmaconomist) comes from the Greek "pharmakon" (meaning "pharmaceuticals") and "nom" (meaning "expert in").

In Denmark a pharmaconomist is also referred to as lægemiddelkyndig (expert in pharmaceuticals). Lægemiddelkyndig comes from the Danish "lægemiddel" (meaning "pharmaceuticals") and "kyndig" (meaning "expert in").

- The title "pharmaconomist" in other languages:
  - English: pharmaconomist (plural: pharmaconomists)
  - Danish: farmakonom (plural: farmakonomer)
  - Faroese: farmakonomur (plural: farmakonomar)
  - French: pharmaconome (plural: pharmaconomes)
  - German: Pharmakonom (plural: Pharmakonomen)
  - Greenlandic: farmakonomit (plural: farmakonominullu)
  - Italian: farmaconomista (plural: farmaconomisti)
  - Spanish: farmaconomista (plural: farmaconomistas)
  - Swedish: farmakonom (plural: farmakonomer)
- The title "expert in pharmaceuticals" in other languages:
  - English: expert in pharmaceuticals (plural: experts in pharmaceuticals)
  - Danish: lægemiddelkyndig (plural: lægemiddelkyndige)
  - French: expert en medicaments (plural: experts en medicaments)
  - German: Arzneimittelexperte (plural: Arzneimittelexperten)
  - Italian: esperto in farmaci (plural: esperti in farmaci)
  - Spanish: experto en fármacos (plural: expertos en fármacos)
  - Swedish: läkemedelsexpert (plural: läkemedelsexperter)
- The academic discipline of "pharmaconomy" in other languages:
  - English: pharmaconomy
  - Danish: farmakonomi
  - German: Pharmakonomie
  - French: pharmaconomie
  - Italian: farmaconomia
  - Spanish: farmaconomía
  - Swedish: farmakonomi

== See also ==
- Professional Further Education in Clinical Pharmacy and Public Health
- History of pharmacy

== Sources ==
- Pharmakon—Danish College of Pharmacy Practice
- The Danish Association of Pharmaconomists
- The Danish Pharmaceutical Association
- Official Curriculum of the Danish Education of Pharmaconomists (September 2007)
- Official Executive Order on the Education of Pharmaconomists (June 2007)
- Information about pharmaconomists
