= Danish Association of Pharmaconomists =

Trade union

Coordinates: 55°40′44″N 12°34′01″E

Farmakonomforeningen
- Danish Association of Pharmaconomists
- Farmakonomforeningen
- Founded: 1946
- Headquarters: Copenhagen, Denmark
- Location: Denmark
- Members: 5,343 (2016)
- Key people: Ann-Mari Grønbæk, president, Nicolai Robinson, CEO
- Affiliations: FH – Confederation of Professionals in Denmark
- Website: farmakonom.dk (in English)

The Danish Association of Pharmaconomists (Danish: Farmakonomforeningen) is the trade union that represents pharmaconomists (experts in pharmaceuticals) and pharmaconomist students in Denmark (including Greenland and Faroe Islands).

The Danish Association of Pharmaconomists has about 5,350 members (i.e. 98% of all Danish pharmaconomists).

Ann-Mari Grønbæk has been president of the trade union has since 2020..

The Danish Association of Pharmaconomists cooperates with Pharmakon—Danish College of Pharmacy Practice and the Association of Danish Pharmacies and is affiliated with the FH – Confederation of Professionals in Denmark.

The association publishes the magazine The Pharmaconomist 6 times a year.

The 5,343 members of the Danish Association of Pharmaconomists are spread within the following areas:

- 53 % — in community pharmacies and in the Association of Danish Pharmacies.
- 8 % — in the pharmaceutical and chemical industry, in medical or clinical laboratories and at Pharmakon—Danish College of Pharmacy Practice.
- 14 % — at hospitals, hospital pharmacies, the University of Copenhagen's Faculty of Health and Medical Sciences, in the Danish Ministry of Interior and Health and at the Danish Medicines Agency.
- 9 % — pharmaconomist students (pharmaconomy students).
- 16 % — passive memberships.
