= IQN =

IQN may refer to:

- IQnovate, an Australian life sciences organization (NSX symbol: IQN)
- Qingyang Xifeng Airport, an airport in Gansu Province, China (IATA code: IQN)
