= Syneos Health =

Contract research organization

Syneos Health, Inc.
- Type: Public (1996-2023); Private (since 2023)
- Traded as: Nasdaq: SYNH
- Industry: Pharmaceutical; Biotechnology
- Predecessors: Inventiv Health; INC Research
- Headquarters: Morrisville, North Carolina, U.S.
- Key people: Costa Panagos (CEO)
- Services: Clinical research; Consulting; Medical affairs
- Revenue: ▲US$5.39 billion (2021) ▲US$5.21 billion (2021)
- Net income: ▲US$266 million (2022)
- Number of employees: 28,000 (2022)
- Website: www.syneoshealth.com

Syneos Health (formerly InVentiv Health Incorporated and INC Research) is an American company that provides contract research and commercial services to pharmaceutical and biotechnology companies. Based in Morrisville, North Carolina, the company specializes in helping other companies with late-stage clinical trials, but also provides commercial services to market health treatments.

Syneos Health was formed from the merger of InVentiv Health and INC Research, each formed from the consolidation of several companies in the contract research industry. It was listed on Nasdaq until 2023 when the company was taken private by Elliott Investment Management.

== History ==
Syneos Health was formed from the merger and acquisition of several companies including InVentiv Health and INC Research.

Through InVentiv Health, part of the company's history can be traced back to Snyder Communications, a company founded by Daniel M. Snyder in the 1980s. Snyder Communications had an initial public offering and began trading in the New York Stock Exchange in 1996.

The company formed a healthcare services division, Snyder Healthcare, in 1997 and acquired a number of healthcare related companies that operated or were based in the UK, France, Germany, Ireland, Holland, and Hungary. As of the end of 1998, the company generated more than $320 million in sales per year and employed about 2,800 people in the United States and more than 4,500 in Europe.

In September 1999, Snyder Healthcare was spun off into an independent company called Ventiv Health Inc., with shareholders receiving one share of Ventiv Health Inc. for every two shares of Snyder Communications. Eran Broshy was appointed to serve as chief executive officer and the company began trading on Nasdaq.

In 2005, the company paid $185 million to acquire InChord Communications, a healthcare marketing agency based in Westerville, Ohio. The company subsequently changed its name to InVentiv Health. In 2006, it became listed on the S&P 600 and also acquired for $60 million Adheris Inc. which provides programs for patient persistence and compliance with their prescribed treatment.

In 2010, the company, which at the time was traded on NASDAQ as VTIV, went private with the acquisition by Thomas H. Lee Partners in a deal estimated at $1.1 billion. In January 2018, eight months after INC Research announced plans to acquire it, the firm assumed a new name, Syneos Health, and stock symbol, Nasdaq: SYNH.

In February 2019, the company announced the SEC had begun an investigation of the company's accounting policies. Syneos Health's 2018 fourth-quarter and year-end reports were delayed. The COVID-19 pandemic lead to increased business for the company because of the "push to develop COVID-19 vaccines and medicines in 2020 and 2021".

In April 2022, Michelle Keefe, who previously worked for two decades at the pharmaceutical Pfizer, was appointed CEO of Syneos Health to succeed Alistair Macdonald who had led the company since 2017. In March 2023, the company signed a multi-year deal to collaborate with Microsoft Research in development of a platform to leverage machine learning for the optimization of clinical trials.

On May 10, 2023, an investment consortium comprising Elliott Investment Management, Patient Square Capital and Veritas Capital, agreed to take Syneos private in a deal worth $4.46 billion, or $7.1 billion including debt. This was completed on September 30, 2023. A few days later, Syneos named Colin Shannon CEO of the company.

On October 9, 2024, Costa Panagos was appointed CEO, replacing Colin Shannon who held the position for the prior eighteen months.

== Operations ==
Syneos Health is currently based in Morrisville, North Carolina. The company's clinical services business specializes in providing contract research for clinical trials to pharmaceutical and biotechnology companies, while the company's commercial services provide marketing and medical affairs for their products. As of the end of 2022, the company's clinical services business contributed to 75% of its revenue and the commercial services contributed to the remaining 25%.

The company generated $4.42 billion in revenue in 2020, $5.21 billion in 2021, and reported $5.39 billion in 2022. Syneos Health employs about 28,000 people in 110 countries as of 2022.
