= Danish Association of the Pharmaceutical Industry =

The Danish Association of the Pharmaceutical Industry (Danish: Lægemiddelindustriforeningen) is a trade association representing 35 companies, both Danish and multinationals, operating in Denmark. It is based in Copenhagen.

Ida Sofie Jensen is the Chief Executive. Julie Enevold Brooker of AstraZeneca, former chair of the Danish Medicines Agency was elected Chair in November 2018.

It has for many years negotiated voluntary pricing agreements with the Ministry of Health, and the Danish Regions for medication used primarily in hospitals. Manufacturers report the latest drug prices every fortnight and community pharmacies then offer and are paid for, the cheapest. Most of this is off patent. Hospital medication is more often under patent and therefore much more expensive. In 2018 the ministry announced that it planned to adopt an external reference price scheme, as used in other European countries, particularly Sweden and Norway where hospital medicine is respectively 10% and 13% lower than in Denmark. This would require manufacturers to report prices for their products in 9 countries and Denmark would pay at the average rate.

It predicts that exports of Danish pharmaceutical products will reach 100 billion kroner in 2018, and increase of 7.5 billion kroner over 2017. Together with agricultural products, pharmaceuticals are Denmark's biggest export.
