= Show globe =

Glass vessel containing a colored liquid

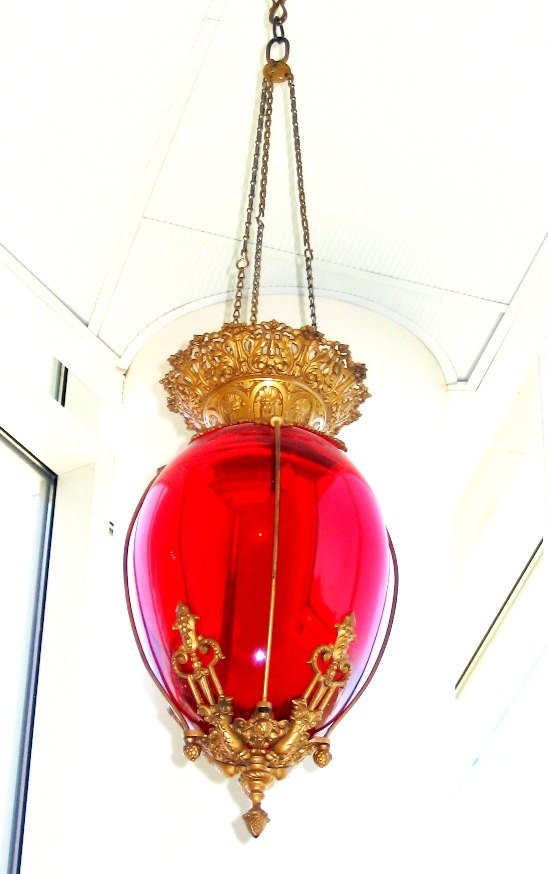
Hanging Show Globe at the Biological Sciences/Pharmacy Library of Ohio State University

A show globe is a glass vessel of various shapes and sizes containing a colorful liquid. It has been a symbol of pharmacy from the 17th century England to the early 20th century in the United States. It marked the drugstore or apothecary in much the same way as the barber's pole marked tonsorial establishments in some countries. People who were illiterate needed such symbols to locate these medical practitioners.

Show globes were displayed almost exclusively in English-speaking countries, contrasting with the wider use of the mortar and pestle as a pharmaceutical symbol.

== Origins and history ==
The most dramatic story of their origin goes back to the time of Julius Caesar 100–44 BC. When the Romans invaded England, according to this report, Caesar's forces found an ideal landing site opposite a pharmacy window which displayed large containers of colored liquids. Julius Caesar's forces guaranteed the pharmacist that he would be safe from the invading forces as long as he kept lighted lanterns in his windows which would serve as a beacon for the landing forces. As a token of his appreciation, Caesar "decreed that henceforth all apothecaries would be permitted to exhibit containers of colored liquids in their windows as a symbol of their calling."

The main problem with this theory is that this would have occurred at least twelve centuries before there was any recognizable profession of pharmacy. This story was reported in The Pharmaceutical Journal (the journal of the Royal Pharmaceutical Society of Great Britain) in 1931. As the columnist wrote, "Surely further research is needed."

Another theory says that show globes had their origins in the Middle East during the period of Islamic domination. Shops were outdoors and pharmacists may have placed their material in elaborate jars or containers which could be the forerunners of show globes. Travelers from Western Europe admired these urns and took the idea back home. There are two reasons why this is probably false; there is no evidence that show globes were popular as a symbol in the Middle East, and instead of show globes appearing throughout Europe they are almost exclusively Anglo-American.

Another hypothesis says that show globes may have been maceration vessels, which were used to steep organic material in sunlight. The trouble with this explanation is that "England is not famous for its sunny days."

Another theory makes the show globe a kind of first aid beacon. Apothecary shops in coastal regions filled vessels with red and green liquids to show sailors where to obtain medical attention.

Apothecaries in England had been competing with physicians since an act passed in 1542 permitted them to practice medicine along with anyone else. According to another theory which puts pharmacists in a good light, during the Great Plague of London (1665–66), while many physicians were fleeing the city, apothecaries placed containers of colored liquids in their windows "to assure the threatened citizenry that they were still there ready to provide needed help." Apothecaries may have seen this as a chance to expand their medical activities, as well as acting altruistically.

George Griffenhagen, pharmacist and acting curator of the Smithsonian Institution, did extensive research into the evolution of the show globe and laid to rest many of the more unusual stories about its origin. He thought that the show globe appeared when the apothecaries and alchemists merged their professions during the mid 16th to mid 17th century. In England in the mid 1550s, just as physicians competed against apothecaries, the apothecaries, who delivered surgical services along with compounding and dispensing herbal medicines, competed with chemists and druggists. Druggists bought drugs in bulk and sold them as merchants (not as medical practitioners like the apothecaries); while chemists, who were derived from alchemists, prepared and sold chemical preparations used for medicinal purposes, like mercurials. To attract attention to themselves and to symbolize the mystery and art of their profession these chemists displayed show globes with solutions of colored chemicals. Apothecaries and physicians were usually considered more conservative in their practice before the 18th century and often restricted themselves to non-chemical drugs using material of largely botanical origins. Most historians today feel the show globe began as a symbol of the chemist's shop. Eventually the apothecaries began to use chemical remedies, and also adopted the globe as their symbol.

For a largely illiterate public the show globe was a welcoming symbol. Charles Dickens once declared they were the only "bright and cheery spot in a London street on a dark and wet night."

== Coming to America ==
According to Charles Richardson, a collector of pharmaceutical artifacts, two apothecaries arrived in Jamestown, Virginia (1607) shortly after it was founded, and the colonists asked the Virginia Company to send more physicians and apothecaries to the colony. In the early American settlements there was a shortage of health professionals; public officials, religious leaders, educators and household heads served as health advisors. Herbs and Indian remedies were used and apothecary shops were set up in large population centers. During the Revolutionary War medicine and pharmacy emerged as separate professions, and the first American Pharmacopoeia was printed in 1778. By the 19th century, pharmacists had stopped practicing medicine and even the name apothecary faded away. Pharmacies developed the warmth and comfort of country stores and were displaying show globes, which by 1789 were being exported to America. According to one writer, the only way pharmacies distinguished themselves from other stores was this unique sign. "Bakeries and hardware stores did not differ greatly from pharmacies in their façades." It was in the United States 19th century that the show globes started to develop their elaborate design and diverse forms. Although the show globe became a pharmacy symbol of mainly English-speaking countries, it did appear in a few other countries notably France.

== Design and colors ==
Next to their origins, the greatest debate about show globes is what, if anything, the colors of the liquids symbolized. Red and blue may have indicated arterial and venous blood. One belief was that if the globe was filled with red liquid there was a plague in town, but if it was filled with green all was well. Pharmacists could create vibrant colors with chemicals in their shops, often following a recipe book.

Most globes were plain glass, but sometimes they were punty cut or etched glass. Some had multiple stoppers, each stopper smaller than the one below, tapering to a small finial at the top. They could be freestanding or wall-mounted. If they were freestanding, they hung from a brass chain; the most elaborate had multiple tiers, each chamber containing a different color of water. It was not so much the pharmacists who were responsible for the evolution of show globes to works of arts, but American glass manufacturers. Pharmaceutical catalogs during the 1870s advertised numerous styles of show globes with each glass manufacturer developing his own design. A U.S. patent was granted in 1869 to Henry Whitney of Cambridge, Massachusetts, for a show globe with a colored glass body with a neck and base of transparent uncolored glass. The purpose of this design was to eliminate the need to use colored liquids, which could leave a residue inside the bottle. Though oil could be used to illuminate the colored glass panes in windows, gas lighting in the early 19th century led to the general use of show globes. They could be lit from the interior or placed in front of a gas jet. In the United States, globes were usually illuminated by a light placed behind them.

== Decline ==
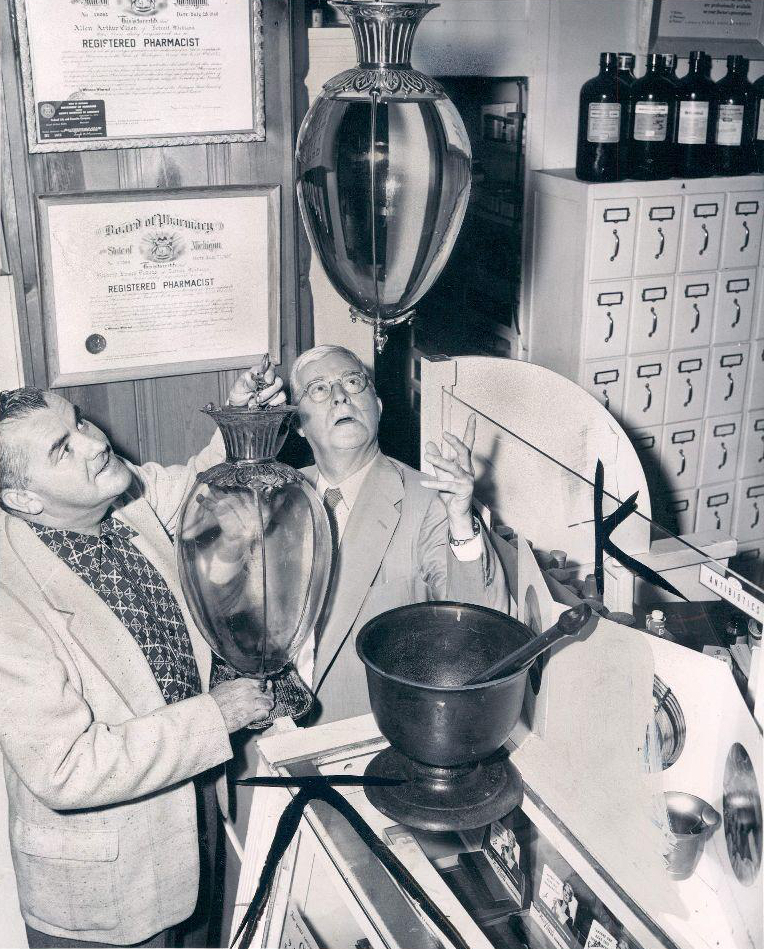
Two pharmacists in Ferndale, Michigan hanging show globes, 1954.

Despite many attempts to revive show globes, they have disappeared from American pharmacies. By the early 20th century, new stores shunned them, and they were disappearing from many older pharmacies. Renewed support for the globes in the 1930s moved the Owens-Illinois Glass Company to introduce a new style with an electric bulb inside to illuminate the globe. However, a 1935 American news article notes "rarely is a show globe ever seen in a modern druggist's emporium". Through the 1950s, American Druggist urged pharmacists to bring back the show globe, terming it "the greatest trademark ever invented."
