= EuroPharm Forum =

The EuroPharm Forum (European Forum of National Pharmaceutical Associations) was a network of national pharmaceutical associations in Europe, in collaboration with the World Health Organization Regional Office for Europe. It was established in 1992 as a professional forum with a strong link to the WHO.

From the beginning in 1992, the EuroPharm Forum was hosted by the WHO Regional Office for Europe. In 2006, the secretariat was relocated to Pharmakon—Danish College of Pharmacy Practice until its closure in 2015.

The Forum organised professional symposia, usually twice annually: in connection with the conduct of the General Assembly and again approximately mid-term.

== See also ==
- List of pharmacy associations
- Pharmakon
