= IQnovate =

- Company type: Public company
- Industry: Healthcare Services & Facilities
- Founded: 2011
- Defunct: 2022
- Fate: Bankruptcy
- Headquarters: Sydney, Australia
- Key people: George Syrmalis, CEO
- Products: Life Sciences Tools and Services
- Number of employees: 10 (2022)
- Website: www.iqnovate.com

IQnovate was an Australian life sciences organization that provided intellectual property asset management services and scientific advice to the biopharmaceutical industry. The company went in administration in 2022 after getting into financial difficulties.

The company was best known for providing services to government organizations and some of the world's largest biopharmaceutical organizations. IQnovate was listed on the National Stock Exchange of Australia under the ticker symbol IQN and on the OTC in New York under the symbol IQNDY. It was delisted in 2022.

IQnovate was headquartered in Sydney, Australia, and George Syrmalis was the company's last CEO.

== History ==
George Syrmalis created the company to provide pharmaceutical, biotechnology, medical device companies, financial institutions and academic and government organizations with advanced asset management and scientific advisory services. At the time of its founding, IQnovate was the only company in Australia providing such services.

IQnovate had been listed on Australian Securities Exchange since December 2011. At its IPO, the company had a market capitalization of $9.74 million.

== Services ==
IQnovate's primary services included intellectual property asset management and consultation on scientific matters to members of the biopharmaceutical industry. The company also provided advisory services to financial institutions regarding investment strategies in the biotech sector. The company's staff consisted of field-based medical science liaisons, specialty medical managers, medical communications, regulatory managers and pricing reimbursement experts.

IQnovate helped biopharmaceutical firms and other large organizations improve operational efficiency and regulatory compliance, hedge the risks associated with drug development and decrease development costs and time to market for new drugs. The company engaged in all aspects of the drug life cycle, and it provided services on all relevant issues in the biopharmaceutical sector, including disease management, product launches, and medical practice guidelines.
