= Autonomous pharmacy =

Autonomous pharmacy is an approach to medication management that seeks to create a more automated and data-driven process for medication inventory and dispensing. The main concept behind autonomous pharmacy is to use technology in place of manual medication processes in order to help healthcare providers reduce medication errors, decrease costs and save staff time. Autonomous pharmacy may use a combination of hardware, software and technology-enabled services to allow pharmacists to more effectively manage medication dispersal.

== Background ==
When a physician prescribes a medication, they expect the correct medication to be administered to the patient; however, the medication management process depends on people, who are subject to human error. In a hospital or health system, a mistake in carrying out a medication order can put patient care at risk, and can even be fatal. According to the World Health Organization, medication errors cause at least one death every day and injure approximately 1.3 million people annually in the U.S. Global costs of medication errors are estimated at $42 billion annually. With better automation that includes technologies such as barcoding, there is less chance for human error.

Health-system pharmacists spend only a quarter of their working hours on clinical activities. Automating medication distribution tasks would enable pharmacists to spend more time working with patients to address their medication-use issues and provide clinical support.

The concept of an autonomous pharmacy is compatible with prior work to advance pharmacy practice, including the American Society of Health-System Pharmacists (ASHP)'s Practice Advancement Initiative 2030 (PAI 2030), whose themes include harnessing data and advancing pharmacy technician roles. Industry leaders, including pharmacy officers from notable hospitals and health systems, have joined to form the Autonomous Pharmacy Advisory Board. The board aims to transform the pharmacy care delivery model through the use of technology to achieve the fully autonomous pharmacy. It has established a five-level framework for achieving the autonomous pharmacy, similar to how levels of driving automation have been defined for autonomous vehicles. Another analog to the autonomous pharmacy framework is the eight-stage Electronic Medical Record Adoption Model developed by the Healthcare Information and Management Systems Society (HIMSS) to score hospitals regarding their electronic medical records (EMR) capabilities.

== Application ==
Health systems are in various stages of progression along the autonomous pharmacy framework based on the medication management technology and data analytics they have implemented. Stanford Health Care uses robotic devices for storage, retrieval, and packaging of medications in the pharmacy. Texas Children's Hospital uses similar robotics technology in its central pharmacy and a robotic system for preparing intravenous (IV) drugs. This frees up time for the hospital's pharmacy technicians to prepare doses that require specialized attention such as those for chemotherapy. Similarly, Vanderbilt University Hospital & Clinics and Wake Forest Baptist Health have also adopted autonomous pharmacy technology in their respective organizations for better medication management.
