= The Chemist =

The Chemist may refer to:

- The Chemist (band), a band formed in Perth, Western Australia in 2007.
- The Chemist (film), a 1936 film
- The Chemist, a 2016 novel by Stephenie Meyer
- The Chemist, a 2025 crime thriller novel by British Indian writer A A Dhand

== See also ==
- Chemist (disambiguation)
- The Qemists, a British Drum & Bass band
