= Bowl of Hygeia =

Symbol of pharmacy

A simple drawing of the Bowl of Hygeia

The Bowl of Hygeia, ⟨🕏, Unicode U+1F54F⟩, is one of the symbols of pharmacology, and along with the Rod of Asclepius, it is one of the most ancient and important symbols related to medicine in western countries. Hygeia was the Greek goddess of health, hygiene, cleanliness, and sanitation, and the daughter of Asclepius, whom she is often closely associated with e.g. in prayers and hymns. Asclepius' symbol is his rod, with a snake twined around it; correspondingly, Hygeia's symbol is a cup or chalice with a snake twined around its stem. Hygeia was also invoked, along with her father Asclepius, and Panacea in the original Hippocratic Oath.

== Usage of symbol by pharmaceutical associations ==
The bowl of Hygeia has been used as a symbol of the pharmacy profession at least as far back as 1796, when it was used on a coin minted for the Parisian Society of Pharmacy. It has since been adopted by many more pharmaceutical associations worldwide, such as the American Pharmacists Association, the Canadian Pharmacists Association, the Pharmaceutical Society of Australia, and the Doctor of Pharmacy Association, Conseil de l'Ordre des Pharmaciens in France (where is written in law with another symbol, the green Greek cross).

The bowl of Hygeia is a common symbol on signs outside of pharmacies in Europe. A mortar and pestle is a more common symbol in the United States.

Typical pharmacy logos featuring the bowl of Hygeia from different countries

All of Europe

Austria

Germany

Hungary
