= Rod of Asclepius =

Symbol of medicine

The emergency medical services' Star of Life features a rod of Asclepius

The Rod of Asclepius (⚕; /æsˈkliːpiəs/, Ancient Greek: Ῥάβδος τοῦ Ἀσκληπιοῦ, Rhábdos toû Asklēpioû, sometimes also spelled Asklepios), also known as the Staff of Aesculapius, is a serpent-entwined rod wielded by the Greek god Asclepius, a deity in Greek mythology associated with healing and medicine. In modern times, it is the predominant symbol for medicine and health care (although the similar caduceus, which has two snakes and a pair of wings, is sometimes misused for that purpose).

== Greek mythology and Greek society ==
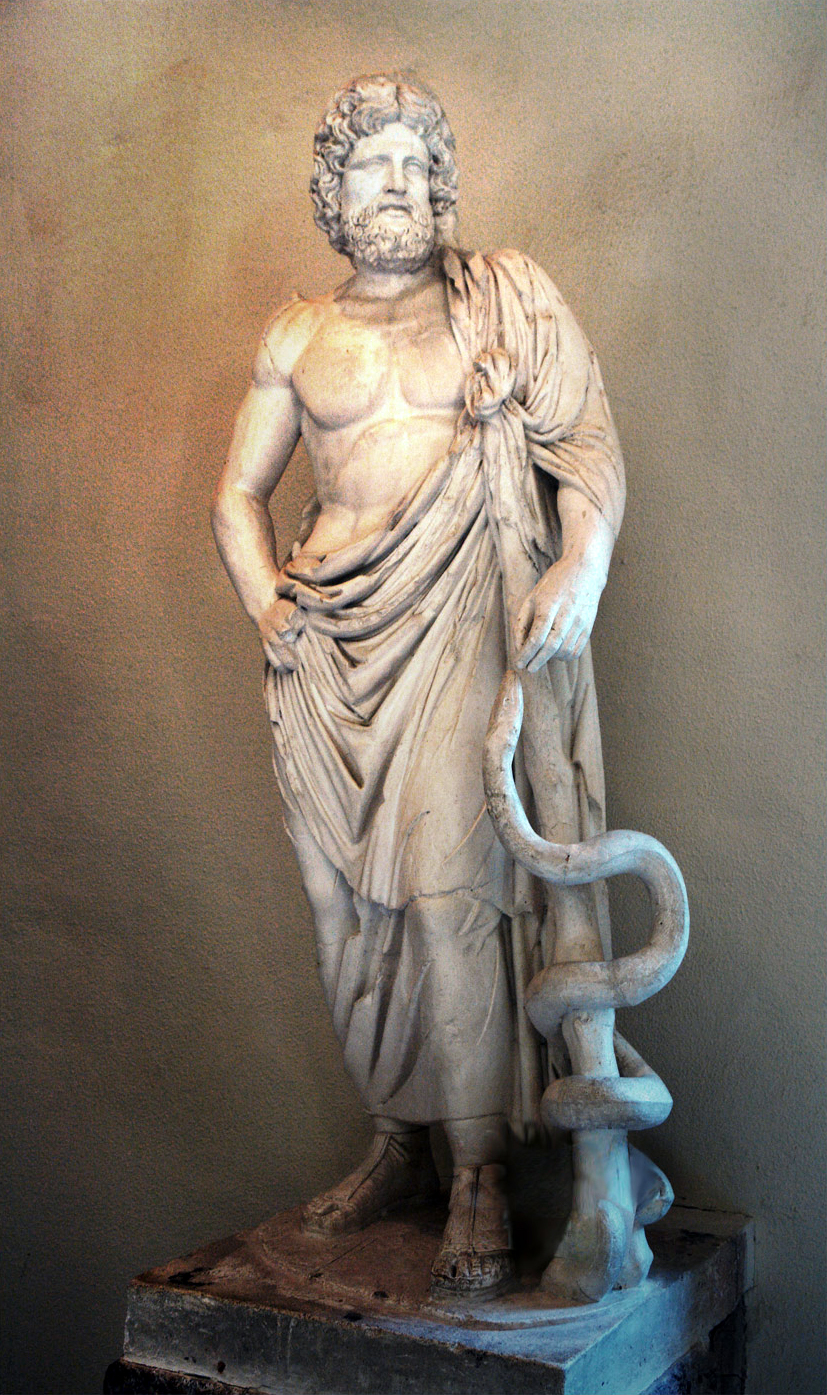
Asclepius with his serpent-entwined staff; Archaeological Museum of Epidaurus

The Rod of Asclepius takes its name from the Greek god Asclepius, a deity associated with healing and medicinal arts in ancient Greek religion and mythology. Asclepius' attributes, the snake and the staff, sometimes depicted separately in antiquity, are combined in this symbol.

The most famous temple of Asclepius was at Epidaurus in north-eastern Peloponnese. Another famous healing temple (or asclepeion) was located on the island of Kos, where Hippocrates, the legendary "father of medicine", may have begun his career. Other asclepieia were situated in Trikala, Gortys (Arcadia), and Pergamum in Asia.

In honour of Asclepius, a particular type of non-venomous rat snake was often used in healing rituals, and these snakes – the Aesculapian snakes – crawled around freely on the floor in dormitories where the sick and injured slept. These snakes were introduced at the founding of each new temple of Asclepius throughout the classical world. From about 300 BCE onwards, the cult of Asclepius grew very popular and pilgrims flocked to his healing temples (Asclepieia) to be cured of their ills. Ritual purification would be followed by offerings or sacrifices to the god (according to means), and the supplicant would then spend the night in the holiest part of the sanctuary – the abaton (or adyton). Any dreams or visions would be reported to a priest who would prescribe the appropriate therapy by a process of interpretation. Some healing temples also used sacred dogs to lick the wounds of sick petitioners.

The original Hippocratic Oath began with the invocation "I swear by Apollo the Healer and by Asclepius and by Hygieia and Panacea and by all the gods ..."

The serpent and the staff appear to have been separate symbols that were combined at some point in the development of the Asclepian cult. The significance of the serpent has been interpreted in many ways; sometimes the shedding of skin and renewal is emphasized as symbolizing rejuvenation, (Note: This interpretation was current in Antiquity, as can be seen in an account of Apollodorus: "your marvel at the serpent curling around him and say that it is the symbol of the healing art, because just as the serpent sloughs the skin of old age, so the medical art releases from illness.") while other assessments center on the serpent as a symbol that unites and expresses the dual nature of the work of the Apothecary Physician, who deals with life and death, sickness and health. The ambiguity of the serpent as a symbol, and the contradictions it is thought to represent, reflect the ambiguity of the use of drugs, which can help or harm, as reflected in the meaning of the term pharmakon, which meant "drug", "medicine", and "poison" in ancient Greek. However the word may become less ambiguous when "medicine" is understood as something that heals the one taking it because it poisons that which afflicts it, meaning medicine is designed to kill or drive away something and any healing happens as a result of that thing being gone, not as a direct effect of medicine. Products deriving from the bodies of snakes were known to have medicinal properties in ancient times, and in ancient Greece, at least some were aware that snake venom that might be fatal if it entered the bloodstream could often be imbibed. Snake venom appears to have been prescribed in some cases as a form of therapy.

The staff has also been variously interpreted. One view is that it, like the serpent, "conveyed notions of resurrection and healing", while another (not necessarily incompatible) is that the staff was a walking stick associated with itinerant physicians. Cornutus, a Greek philosopher probably active in the first century CE, in the Theologiae Graecae Compendium (Ch. 33) offers a view of the significance of both snake and staff:

Asclepius derived his name from healing soothingly and from deferring the withering that comes with death. For this reason, therefore, they give him a serpent as an attribute, indicating that those who avail themselves of medical science undergo a process similar to the serpent in that they, as it were, grow young again after illnesses and slough off old age; also because the serpent is a sign of attention, much of which is required in medical treatments. The staff also seems to be a symbol of some similar thing. For by means of this it is set before our minds that unless we are supported by such inventions as these, in so far as falling continually into sickness is concerned, stumbling along we would fall even sooner than necessary.

In any case, the two symbols certainly merged in antiquity as representations of the snake coiled about the staff are common. Furthermore, the symbol's similarity with the healing brazen serpent of Moses facilitated the institutionalisation of this motif as a symbol of medicine during the Renaissance.

== Confusion with the caduceus ==
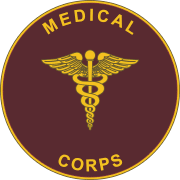
The US Army Medical Corps plaque. The adoption, in 1902, of the caduceus for US Army medical officer uniforms popularized the (mis)use of the symbol throughout the United States' medical field

It is relatively common, especially in the United States, to find the caduceus, with its two snakes and wings, (mis)used as a symbol of medicine instead of the Rod of Asclepius, with only a single snake. This usage was popularized by the adoption of the caduceus as its insignia by the U.S. Army Medical Corps in 1902 at the insistence of a single officer (though there are conflicting claims as to whether this was Capt. Frederick P. Reynolds or Col. John R. van Hoff).

The Rod of Asclepius is the dominant symbol for professional healthcare associations in the United States. One survey found that 62% of professional healthcare associations used the rod of Asclepius as their symbol. The same survey found that 76% of commercial healthcare organizations use the caduceus. The author of the study suggests that professional associations are more likely to have a historical understanding of the two symbols, whereas commercial organizations are more likely to be concerned with the visual impact a symbol will have on its sales.

The long-standing historical association of the caduceus with commerce has engendered significant criticism of its use in medicine. Medical professionals argue that the Rod of Asclepius better represents the field of medicine. Writing in the journal Scientific Monthly, Stuart L. Tyson said of the Staff of Hermes (the caduceus):

As god of the high-road and the market-place Hermes was perhaps above all else the patron of commerce and the fat purse: as a corollary, he was the special protector of the traveling salesman. As spokesman for the gods, he not only brought peace on earth (occasionally even the peace of death), but his silver-tongued eloquence could always make the worse appear the better cause. From this latter point of view, would not his symbol be suitable for certain Congressmen, all medical quacks, book agents and purveyors of vacuum cleaners, rather than for the straight-thinking, straight-speaking therapeutist? As conductor of the dead to their subterranean abode, his emblem would seem more appropriate on a hearse than on a physician's car.

— Stuart L. Tyson, "The Caduceus", in the Scientific Monthly, 1932

== Modern use ==
The flag of the World Health Organization, with a rod of Asclepius

A number of organizations and services use the rod of Asclepius as their logo, or part of their logo. These include:

=== Asia ===
- Armed Forces Medical Services
- Army Medical Corps (India)
- Beijing University of Chinese Medicine
- Chinese Medical Association
- Dental Council of India
- International Medical University, Malaysia
- Medical Corps (Israel)
- Medical Council of India
- Ministry of Health, Cambodia
- Ministry of Health, Myanmar
- Ministry of Health and Welfare, Republic of China
- Ministry of Health of the People's Republic of China
- Ministry of Health Vietnam
- Myanmar Army Medical Corps
- Pakistan Army Medical Corps

=== Africa ===
- Kenya Medical Research Institute
- Kenya Medical Training College
- Nigerian Medical Association
- South African Medical Research Council former coat of arms
- South African Military Health Service

=== South Pacific ===
- Australian Medical Association
- Australian Medical Students' Association
- Medical Council of New Zealand
- Royal Australian Army Medical Corps
- Royal New Zealand Army Medical Corps

=== Canada ===
- Alberta Medical Association
- Canadian Association of Physicians for the Environment
- Canadian Dental Association
- Canadian Medical Association
- College of Physicians and Surgeons of Manitoba
- Medical Council of Canada
- Ottawa Paramedic Service
- Paramedic Association of Canada
- Royal Canadian Dental Corps
- Royal Canadian Medical Service
- Royal College of Physicians and Surgeons of Canada

=== Europe ===
- Albert Szent-Györgyi Medical University
- Association of Anaesthetists of Great Britain and Ireland
- British Medical Association
- Royal Army Medical Service (UK)
- Emergency medical services in France (SAMU, SMUR, et al.)
- Emergency medical services in Italy
- Emergency medical services in Portugal
- Emergency medical services in the Netherlands
- Emergency medical services in the United Kingdom
- Jessenius Faculty of Medicine (SVK)
- The London Clinic
- Royal College of Psychiatrists (UK)
- Royal Society of Medicine (UK)
- University of Copenhagen Faculty of Health and Medical Sciences

=== United States ===
- Alabama College of Osteopathic Medicine
- American Academy of Family Physicians
- American Academy of Psychiatry and the Law
- American College of Osteopathic Internists
- American Medical Association
- American Medical Response
- American Medical Student Association
- American Osteopathic Association
- American Veterinary Medical Association
- Blue Cross Blue Shield Association (U.S.)
- Chicago College of Osteopathic Medicine
- Geisel School of Medicine (at Dartmouth)
- Heritage College of Osteopathic Medicine
- Hofstra School of Medicine
- Idaho College of Osteopathic Medicine
- International Medical Corps
- Kansas City University of Medicine and Biosciences
- MedicAlert (U.S.)
- Michigan State Medical Society
- Morehouse School of Medicine
- National Association of Emergency Medical Technicians
- National Athletic Trainers Association
- National Medical Association
- National Registry of Emergency Medical Technicians
- New York University School of Medicine
- Stanford University School of Medicine
- Student National Medical Association
- Student Osteopathic Medical Association (U.S.)
- United States Air Force Medical Corps
- University of Minnesota Medical School
- Yale University School of Medicine

=== Worldwide ===
- Medical Protection Society
- Star of Life, symbol of emergency medical services
- World Health Organization

=== Variation ===
In Russia, the emblem of Main Directorate for Drugs Control features a variation with a sword and a snake on the shield.

== Unicode ==
⚕o

Staff of Aesculapius
- In Unicode: U+2695 ⚕ STAFF OF AESCULAPIUS

Related
- See also: U+269A ⚚ STAFF OF HERMES; U+1F54F 🕏 BOWL OF HYGIEIA

A symbol for the rod of Asclepius has a code point (U+2695 ⚕ STAFF OF AESCULAPIUS) in the Miscellaneous Symbols table of the Unicode Standard.

== See also ==
- Aaron's rod – Staves carried by Moses's brother, Aaron, in the Torah
- Bowl of Hygieia – Symbol of pharmacy
- Chakra – Centres of the subtle body
- Iron crutch (symbol of Traditional Chinese medicine)
- Nāga – Mythological creatures in Indian religions
- Ningishzida – Mesopotamian god
- Phurba – Tibetan ritual implement
- Nehushtan – Brass serpent in Torah, the brazen serpent of Moses.
