= Pharmaceutical manufacturing =

Synthesis of pharmaceutical drugs

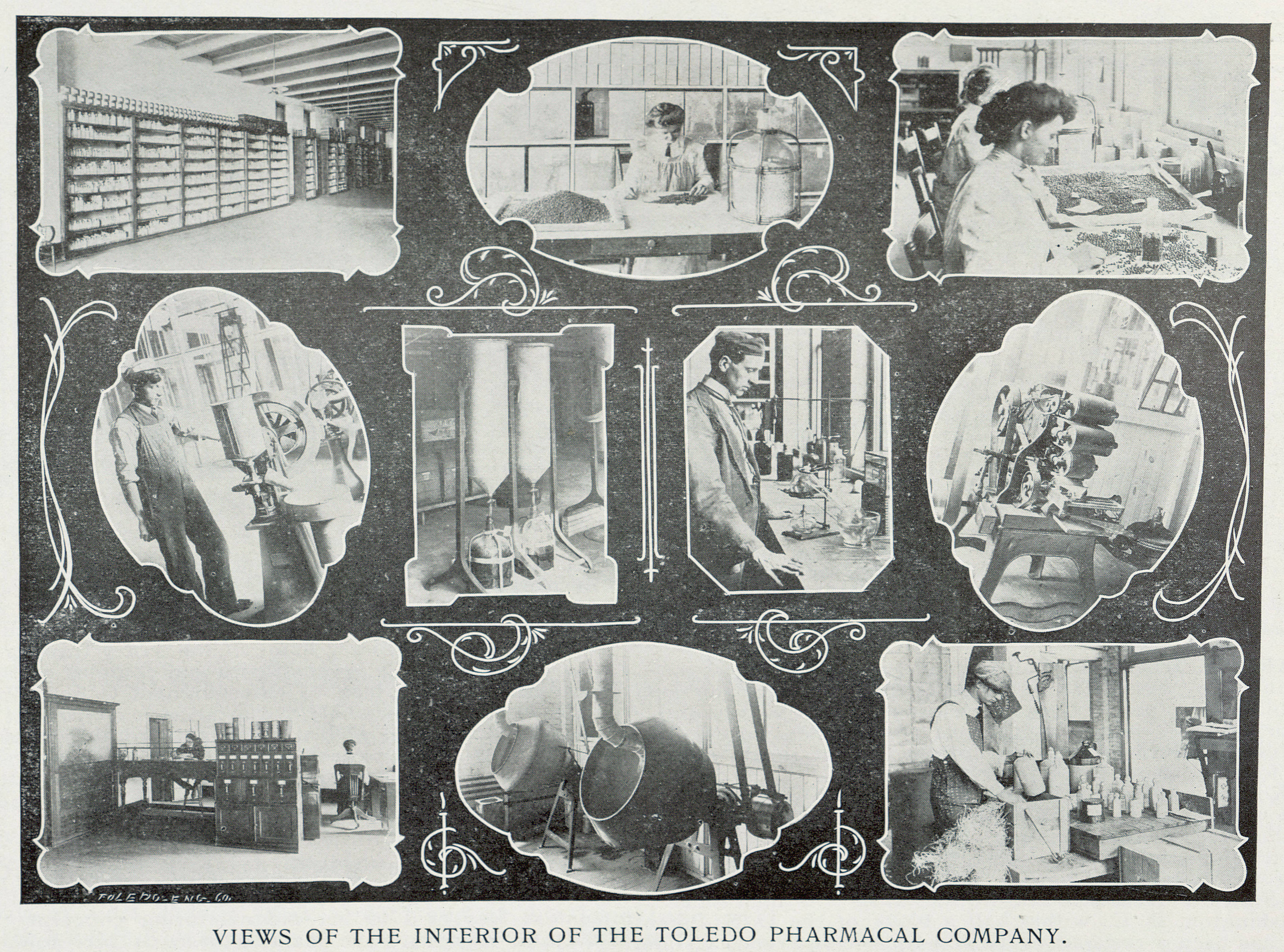
Toledo Pharmacal Company from Toledo, Ohio seen in 1905

Pharmaceutical manufacturing is the process of industrial-scale synthesis of pharmaceutical drugs as part of the pharmaceutical industry. The process of drug manufacturing can be broken down into a series of unit operations, such as milling, granulation, coating, tablet pressing, and others.

== Scale-up considerations ==
=== Cooling ===
While a laboratory may use dry ice as a cooling agent for reaction selectivity, this process gets complicated on an industrial scale. The cost to cool a typical reactor to this temperature is large, and the viscosity of the reagents typically also increases as the temperature lowers, leading to difficult mixing. This results in added costs to stir harder and replace parts more often, or it results in a non-homogeneous reaction. Finally, lower temperatures can result in crusting of reagents, intermediates, and byproducts to the reaction vessel over time, which will impact the purity of the product.

=== Stoichiometry ===
Different stoichiometric ratios of reagents can result in different ratios of products formed. On the industrial scale, adding a large amount of reagent A to reagent B may take time. During this, the reagent A that is added is exposed to a much higher stoichiometric amount of reagent B until it is all added, and this imbalance can lead to reagent A prematurely reacting, and subsequent products to also react with the huge excess of reagent B.

=== Solvent extractions ===
Whether to add organic solvent into aqueous solvent, or vice versa, becomes important on the industrial scale. Depending on the solvents used, emulsions can form, and the time needed for the layers to separate can be extended if the mixing between solvents is not optimal. When adding organic solvent to aqueous, stoichiometry must be considered again, as the excess of water could hydrolyze organic compounds in only mildly acidic or basic conditions. In an even wider scope, the location of the chemical plant can play a role in the ambient temperature of the reaction vessel. A difference of even a couple of degrees can yield much different levels of extractions between plants located across countries.

== Unit operations ==
=== Powder feeding in continuous manufacturing ===
In continuous manufacturing, input raw materials and energy are fed into the system at a constant rate, and at the same time, a constant extraction of output products is achieved. The process's performance is heavily dependent on the stability of the material flowrate. For powder-based continuous processes, it is critical to feed powders consistently and accurately into subsequent unit operations of the process line, as feeding is typically the first unit operation. Feeders have been designed to achieve performance reliability, feed rate accuracy, and minimal disturbances. Accurate and consistent delivery of materials by well-designed feeders ensures overall process stability. Loss-in-weight (LIW) feeders are selected for pharmaceutical manufacturing. Loss-in-weight (LIW) feeders control material dispensing by weight at a precise rate and are often selected to minimize the flowrate variability that is caused by change of fill level and material bulk density. Importantly, feeding performance is strongly dependent on powder flow properties.

=== Powder blending ===
In the pharmaceutical industry, a wide range of excipients may be blended together with the active pharmaceutical ingredient to create the final blend used to manufacture the solid dosage form. The range of materials that may be blended (excipients, API), presents a number of variables which must be addressed to achieve target product quality attributes. These variables may include the particle size distribution (including aggregates or lumps of material), particle shape (spheres, rods, cubes, plates, and irregular), presence of moisture (or other volatile compounds), particle surface properties (roughness, cohesion), and powder flow properties.

=== Milling ===
During the drug manufacturing process, milling is often required in order to reduce the average particle size in a drug powder. There are a number of reasons for this, including increasing homogeneity and dosage uniformity, increasing bioavailability, and increasing the solubility of the drug compound. In some cases, repeated powder blending followed by milling is conducted to improve the manufacturability of the blends.

=== Granulation ===
In general, there are two types of granulation: wet granulation and dry granulation. Granulation can be thought of as the opposite of milling; it is the process by which small particles are bound together to form larger particles, called granules. Granulation is used for several reasons. Granulation prevents the "demixing" of components in the mixture, by creating a granule which contains all of the components in their required proportions, improves flow characteristics of powders (because small particles do not flow well), and improves compaction properties for tablet formation.

=== Hot melt extrusion ===
Hot melt extrusion is utilized in pharmaceutical solid oral dose processing to enable delivery of drugs with poor solubility and bioavailability. Hot melt extrusion has been shown to molecularly disperse poorly soluble drugs in a polymer carrier increasing dissolution rates and bioavailability. The process involves the application of heat, pressure and agitation to mix materials together and 'extrude' them through a die. Twin-screw high shear extruders blend materials and simultaneously break up particles. The resulting particles can be blended and compressed into tablets or filled into capsules.

== Documentation ==
The documentation of activities by pharmaceutical manufacturers is a license-to-operate endeavor, supporting both the quality of the product produced and satisfaction of regulators who oversee manufacturing operations and determine whether a manufacturing process may continue or must be terminated and remediated.

=== Site Master File (SMF) ===
A Site Master File is a document in the pharmaceutical industry which provides information about the production and control of manufacturing operations. The document is created by a manufacturer. The Site Master file contains specific and factual GMP information about the production and control of pharmaceutical manufacturing operations carried out at the named site and any closely integrated operations at adjacent and nearby buildings. If only part of a pharmaceutical operation is carried out on the site, the site master file needs to describe only those operations, e.g., analysis, packaging.

== See also ==
- Chemical engineering – Engineering discipline focused on the design and operation of chemical plants
- Chemical reactor – Enclosed volume where interconversion of compounds takes place
- Medical science liaison
- Pharmaceutical formulation – Process for producing a final medicinal product
- Pharmaceutical packaging – Packaging for pharmaceutical preparations
- Site Master File – Synthesis of pharmaceutical drugs
- 3D drug printing – 3D printing of customized medication
