= Chemist (disambiguation) =

Chemist may refer to:

In all countries:

- Chemist, a scientist trained in the science of chemistry

In Australia, Hong Kong, Ireland, New Zealand, the United Kingdom, Malaysia, Singapore, South Africa and some other countries:

- a pharmacist (dispensing chemist)
- a pharmacy (shop)

== See also ==
- List of chemists
- The Chemist (disambiguation)
- The Qemists, a British Drum & Bass band
