= Pharmakon—Danish College of Pharmacy Practice =

Coordinates: 55°55′17.91″N 12°17′50.16″E

Pharmakon—Danish College of Pharmacy Practice (Danish: Farmakonomuddannelsen Pharmakon) is a university college situated in the city of Hillerød on the island of Zealand in Denmark.

The Danish College of Pharmacy Practice is a tertiary educational institution of pharmaceutical sciences that offers the higher education programme of pharmaconomy.

Each year, approximately 300 high school graduates with special skills are allowed to begin the studies of pharmaconomy as pharmaconomist students at The Danish College of Pharmacy Practice.

With about 850 pharmaconomy students, Pharmakon—Danish College of Pharmacy Practice is the only college in Denmark (including Greenland and Faroe Islands) to offer the pharmaconomist education programme.

== International affairs ==
Pharmakon—Danish College of Pharmacy Practice plays an active role in the international arena. In 1996, it was designated as a WHO Collaborating Centre for Drug Policy and Pharmacy Practice.

Furthermore, the College hosted the secretariats of the Community Pharmacy Section of the International Pharmaceutical Federation and the EuroPharm Forum.

== See also ==
- College of pharmacy
- Pharmacist
- Pharmaconomist
- Pharmaconomy
- Pharmacy
- UCPH School of Pharmaceutical Sciences
