= Danish Medicines Agency =

Agency under the Danish Ministry of Health and Prevention

The Danish Medicines Agency (Danish: Lægemiddelstyrelsen) is an agency under the Danish Ministry of Health and Prevention.

The purpose of the agency is to ensure that medicinal products used in Denmark are of satisfactory quality, are safe to use and that they have the desired effect. It supervises companies manufacturing and distributing medicinal products. This is done through administering the Danish legislation on medicinal products, reimbursement, pharmacies, medical devices and euphoriants. The Agency takes part in the Danish innovation system Biopeople at the University of Copenhagen.

== Databases ==
Interaktionsdatabasen is the Danish drug interaction database. It is maintained by the Danish Medicines Agency.
