= Medical science liaison =

Connecting biotechnology and health care

A medical science liaison (MSL) is a healthcare consulting professional who is employed by pharmaceutical, biotechnology, medical device, and managed care companies. Other job titles for medical science liaisons may include medical liaisons, clinical science liaisons, medical science managers, regional medical scientists, and regional medical directors.

The term "MSL" was originally trademarked by Upjohn as "Education services – namely, initiation of drug studies in laboratory and clinical settings and development of workshops, symposia, and seminars for physicians, medical societies, specialty organizations, academicians, in concert, concerned with drug related medical topics" in 1967 and with first use in commerce in 1967.

As the number of MSL programs in healthcare increased, subsequent peer-reviewed journal publications and books became available to examine the emerging role of medical affairs and the use of MSLs in an increasingly vertically integrated biotechnology industry.

== Role ==
MSLs build relationships with key opinion leaders or thought leaders and health care providers, providing critical windows of insight into the market and competition. Through such monitoring, MSLs can gain access to key influencers by interacting with national and regional societies and organizations. Moreover, MSLs specialize in a particular therapeutic area and have scientific knowledge related to it. The educational background of MSLs consists primarily of MDs, DMSc, PharmD, and PhD professionals. Other professions who work as MSLs include Physician Assistants and Nurses. According to the program's advocates, the Board Certified Medical Affairs Specialist (BCMAS) program is the recognized MSL board certification for MSL professionals. They are now highly involved in activities related to clinical trials.

== Responsibilities ==
The medical science liaison role is varied and day-to-day activities include (but are not limited to);

- Managing investigator initiated studies
- Performing KOL stakeholder mapping
- Developing collaborative relationships with KOLs
- Organising advisory boards
- Maintaining a high level of therapeutic area knowledge
- Training sales representatives
- Providing medical review to ensure all company materials are compliant and accurately reflect the body of scientific evidence
- Delivering insights from KOLs to inform the medical affairs strategy

== See also ==
- Biopharmaceutical – Drug made from biological source
- Pharmaceutical manufacturing – Synthesis of pharmaceutical drugs
- Pharmaceutical marketing – Advertising by pharmaceutical companies
