= Brass Man =

2005 science fiction novel by Neal Asher

- First edition
- Author: Neal Asher
- Cover artist: Steve Rawlings
- Language: English
- Series: Ian Cormac
- Genre: Science fiction novel
- Publisher: Macmillan/Tor
- Publication date: 2005
- Publication place: United Kingdom
- Media type: Print (Hardback & Paperback)
- Pages: 485
- ISBN: 1-4050-0138-0
- OCLC: 57485509
- Preceded by: The Line of Polity
- Followed by: Polity Agent

Brass Man is a 2005 science fiction novel by Neal Asher. It is the sequel to Gridlinked and set in the same future as The Skinner. The plot centers around two rivals hunting an interstellar dragon: Ian Cormac, an Earth Central Security Agent, and Mr. Crane, a psychotic artificial man.
