= Pharmacist-to-pharmacy technician ratio =

The pharmacist-to-pharmacy technician ratio is a legal regulation that establishes the maximum number of pharmacy technicians that may be supervised by a licensed pharmacist at one given time. For example, a pharmacist-to-pharmacy technician ratio of 1:4 would mean that three people are allowed to be working as pharmacy technicians at one time for every one pharmacist present.

== Characterization ==
In the United States, the regulation of the pharmacist-to-pharmacy technician ratio is regulated at the individual state level. Some states vary the ratio by institutional (e.g. hospital) pharmacy practice versus retail (i.e. community) pharmacy practice, while others do not regulate pharmacist-to-pharmacy technician ratios at all. The ratios vary from a minimum of 1:2 (e.g. in Kansas) to 1:6 (e.g. Idaho).

Variation by state
State	Pharmacist-to-pharmacy technician ratio
Alabama	1:3 if one is certified or 1:4 if 2 are certified
Alaska	None
Arizona	None
Arkansas	1:3
California	1:1, then two more techs for each additional pharmacist
Colorado	1:6, majority must be certified
Connecticut	1:3 institutional pharmacy, 1:2 community pharmacy
Delaware	None
Florida	1:4
Georgia	1:4 (1 certified for 3 techs; 2 certified for 4 techs), may only be exceed in hospital settings after written Board approval.
Hawaii	None
Idaho	1:6
Illinois	None
Indiana	1:4
Iowa	1:2
Kansas	1:4
Kentucky	None
Louisiana	1:4
Maine	None
Maryland	None
Massachusetts	1:4
Michigan	None
Minnesota	1:3 (unless one technician is certified, then 1:4)
Mississippi	1:2
Missouri	None
Montana	1:3
Nebraska	1:3
Nevada	1:3
New Hampshire	None
New Jersey	1:2 (unless one technician is certified, then 1:3)
New Mexico	None
New York	1:4
North Carolina	1:2, more technicians may be allowed upon board approval
North Dakota	1:4
Ohio	None
Oklahoma	1:4 hospital, 1:2 community pharmacy
Oregon	None
Pennsylvania	None
Rhode Island	None
South Carolina	Institutional pharmacy 1:3; Community pharmacy 1:4 with 2 being state certified techs
South Dakota	None for institutional pharmacy, 1:3 community pharmacy
Tennessee	1:6 - may be higher is additional technicians are certified technicians. A modification to the amount of technicians may be requested from the Board of Pharmacy.
Texas	1:6
Utah	Ratio was removed from law.
Vermont	None
Virginia	1:4
Washington	No longer has a ratio as of September 14, 2019.
West Virginia	1:4
Wisconsin	1:4 (unless approved by Board of Pharmacy)
Wyoming	1:3

In some countries, such as in the United Kingdom and in Denmark, technicians can practice without pharmacist supervision at all. Globally, one survey found that pharmacists are the most frequent source of supervision for pharmacy technicians.

== Rationale and criticism ==
Pharmacist-to-pharmacy technician ratios are an attempt to find a balance between providing assistance to the practicing pharmacist in operating the pharmacy while maintaining adequate supervision of their pharmacy technicians. While staffing issues are reported by pharmacy technicians to increase the risk for medication-related medical errors, misconduct by an unsupervised pharmacy technician can result in significant patient harm. Critics of low pharmacist-to-pharmacy technician ratios have complained that the lack of pharmacy technicians staffing forces pharmacists to devote more time to non-clinical, dispensing-related tasks, as opposed to performing direct patient care services and over-the-counter counseling.

== History ==
While pharmacist-to-pharmacy technician ratio were initially low with pharmacy technicians engaged in retail tasks (acting as cashiers), the ratios have increased over time as pharmacy technicians have taken on new duties, such as pharmaceutical formulation and intermediating between the pharmacy and insurance companies.

== See also ==
- Pharmacy (shop)
