= Orbus =

Orbus may refer to:

- Orbus (novel), 2009, by Neal Asher
- Orbus, a French radio network
- Orbus-21S, the Intelsat 603 satellite's 1990/1992 upper-stage rockets
- Orbus, a bus operator in the Otago region, New Zealand
