= Institute of Technology (California/Oregon) =

- Other name: IOT
- Former name: Fresno Institute of Technology
- Motto: Where careers begin.
- Type: Vocational school
- Established: 1986
- Location: California/Oregon, U.S. 36°50′15″N 119°48′11″W
- Website: www.iot.edu

The Institute of Technology (IOT) is a vocational school operating in California and Oregon. Several career training programs are offered at its four campus locations at Clovis, Modesto, Redding, and Salem, Oregon.

== History ==
The Institute of Technology was founded in 1986 as the Fresno Institute of Technology at Clovis. Later the name was shortened to the Institute of Technology. The school now operates three California campuses (Clovis, Modesto, Redding) and one in Salem, Oregon. The institute is operated by Modesto-based Select Education Group.

== Training programs ==
Four main program fields are taught: culinary, technical, medical, and business fields. Within each field, students are given the opportunity to specialize in specific areas. For example, they have the opportunity to become a culinary arts specialist, network support technician, pharmacy technician, licensed vocational nurse, or human resource administrator.

== Accreditation ==
The Institute of Technology is accredited by the Accrediting Commission of Career Schools and Colleges (ACCSC).

The Salem campus is accredited by the Accrediting Council for Continuing Education and Training (ACCET).
