= Monsbey College =

Private vocational college in California

Coordinates: 36.9302°N 121.7914°W

- Motto: Moulding Learners for the Future
- Type: Vocational college
- Established: 2008
- President: Koshy M. Skaria
- Vice-president: Binumol M. Skaria
- Location: 6 Hangar Way, Suite B, Watsonville, CA 95076, Watsonville, California, United States
- Colors: Red and Blue
- Website: Monsbey College official website

Monsbey College is a private vocational college offering over 15+ programs, including Certified Nursing Assistant, Home Health Aide, Pharmacy Technician, Medical Assistant, and Medical terminology . Its main campus is located in Watsonville, California. The college opened in 2008. As is true with most vocational colleges, the a majority of its students attend part-time. A main attraction to the college is the low cost and efficient training under those with years of experience. The college had its programs approved by: California Dept. of Public Health (CDPH, American Red Cross, Pharmacy Technician Certification Board (PTCB), National Healthcareer Association (NHA)and Work Force Investment Board (California's Eligible Training Provider).
