= Dark Intelligence =

2015 science fiction novel by Neal Asher

- Original cover art for the Macmillan hardback edition
- Author: Neal Asher
- Cover artist: Jon Sullivan
- Language: English
- Genre: Science fiction novel
- Publisher: Pan Macmillan
- Publication date: 29 January 2015
- Publication place: United Kingdom
- Media type: Print (hardback, paperback), eBook
- Pages: 400
- ISBN: 978-1-4472-6002-8

Dark Intelligence is a 2015 science fiction novel by Neal Asher. The story is set in the Polity universe and focuses on the dark (corrupted) AI Penny Royal. The plot follows several characters, each searching for Penny Royal for different reasons and culminates in a clash around the world of Masada. The plot is closely linked to that of Asher's 2011 novel The Technician. The main protagonist is Thorvald Spear, a new character to Asher's novels, who has been reanimated in a cloned body after his mind storage crystal was recovered over a century after his death. As the novel develops it becomes clear that Spear's memories have been adjusted allowing the character to serve as an unreliable narrator.
