= Polity Agent =

2006 science fiction novel by Neal Asher

- First edition
- Author: Neal Asher
- Cover artist: Steve Rawlings
- Language: English
- Series: Ian Cormac
- Genre: Science fiction novel
- Publisher: Tor Books
- Publication date: 2006
- Publication place: United Kingdom
- Media type: Print (hardback)
- Pages: 496 pp
- ISBN: 1-4050-5498-0
- OCLC: 77011443
- Preceded by: Brass Man
- Followed by: Line War

Polity Agent is a 2006 science fiction novel by British writer Neal Asher. Described as a "space opera set 800 years in the future", It is the fourth novel in the Agent Cormac series set in the Polity Universe from Gridlinked.
