= Line War =

2008 science fiction novel by Neal Asher

Polity Agent
- First edition
- Author: Neal Asher
- Cover artist: Steve Rawlings
- Language: English
- Series: Ian Cormac
- Genre: Science fiction novel
- Publisher: Tor
- Publication date: 2008
- Publication place: United Kingdom
- Media type: Print (Hardback)
- Pages: 510
- ISBN: 1-4050-5501-4
- OCLC: 183916684
- Preceded by: Polity Agent

Line War is a 2008 science fiction novel by Neal Asher. It is the fifth and final novel in the Gridlinked sequence, although other novels exist in the same universe outside this sequence. It received positive reviews by critics.
