= Pharmacists for Future =

German advocacy group

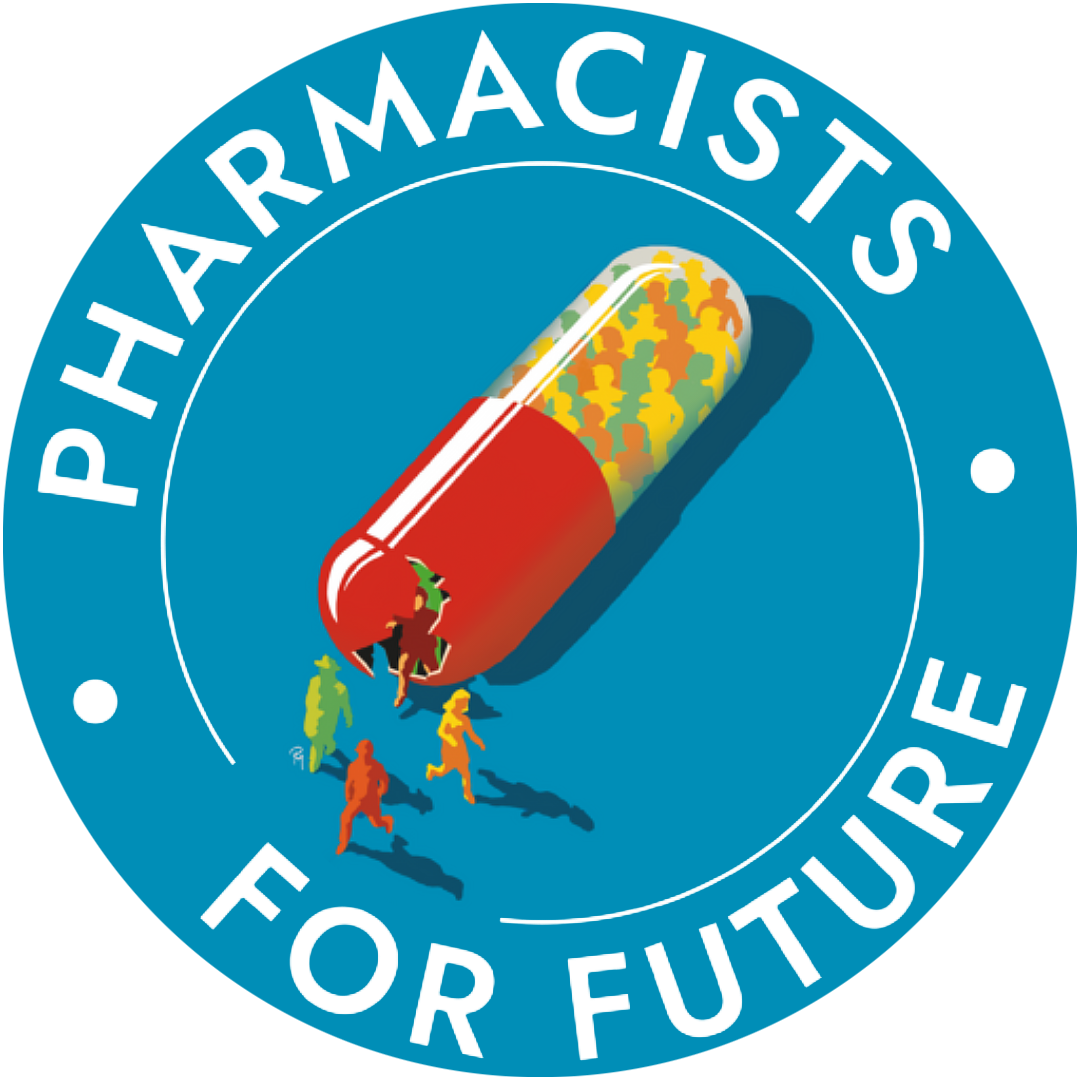
- Abbreviation: Ph4F
- Formation: 2021
- Founded at: Germany
- Region served: Nationwide
- Website: www.pharmacistsforfuture.org

Pharmacists for Future (Ph4F) is an initiative that unites individuals from the field of pharmacy who are committed to climate protection. They are active throughout Germany and aim to make pharmacy more sustainable. Their activities include public education, professional training for colleagues, and promoting sustainable practices in pharmacy. One of their aims is to educate a wide range of people through the low-threshold opportunities of pharmacies about the health impacts of the climate crisis. At the same time, they emphasize that the environmental impact of and on medications must not be neglected. Educating patients about these connections can help reduce overuse and overconsumption of medications.

== Organization ==
Pharmacists for Future was founded in February 2021 and is an initiative of the Association of Democratic Pharmacists. The members of Ph4F are volunteers consisting of pharmacists and pharmacy technicians from various fields such as public pharmacies, hospitals, the pharmaceutical industry, pharmaceutical research, or government ministries. They operate as a national association and are divided into three regional groups: North, East, and Southwest, with offices in Berlin, Jena, and Tübingen, respectively. As part of the For-Future alliance, they see themselves as a contribution to the overall climate movement for climate protection and sustainability.

== Objectives ==
Ph4F advocates for:

- the handling of the climate crisis and its health impacts to become a core task of the healthcare sector,
- adherence to the goals of the Paris Agreement and the 1.5°C target,
- the consideration of the health impacts of climate change in all climate protection measures,
- the mandatory inclusion of climate change and health topics in the curricula of education, training, and further education programs for allied health professions.

== Presence and achievements ==
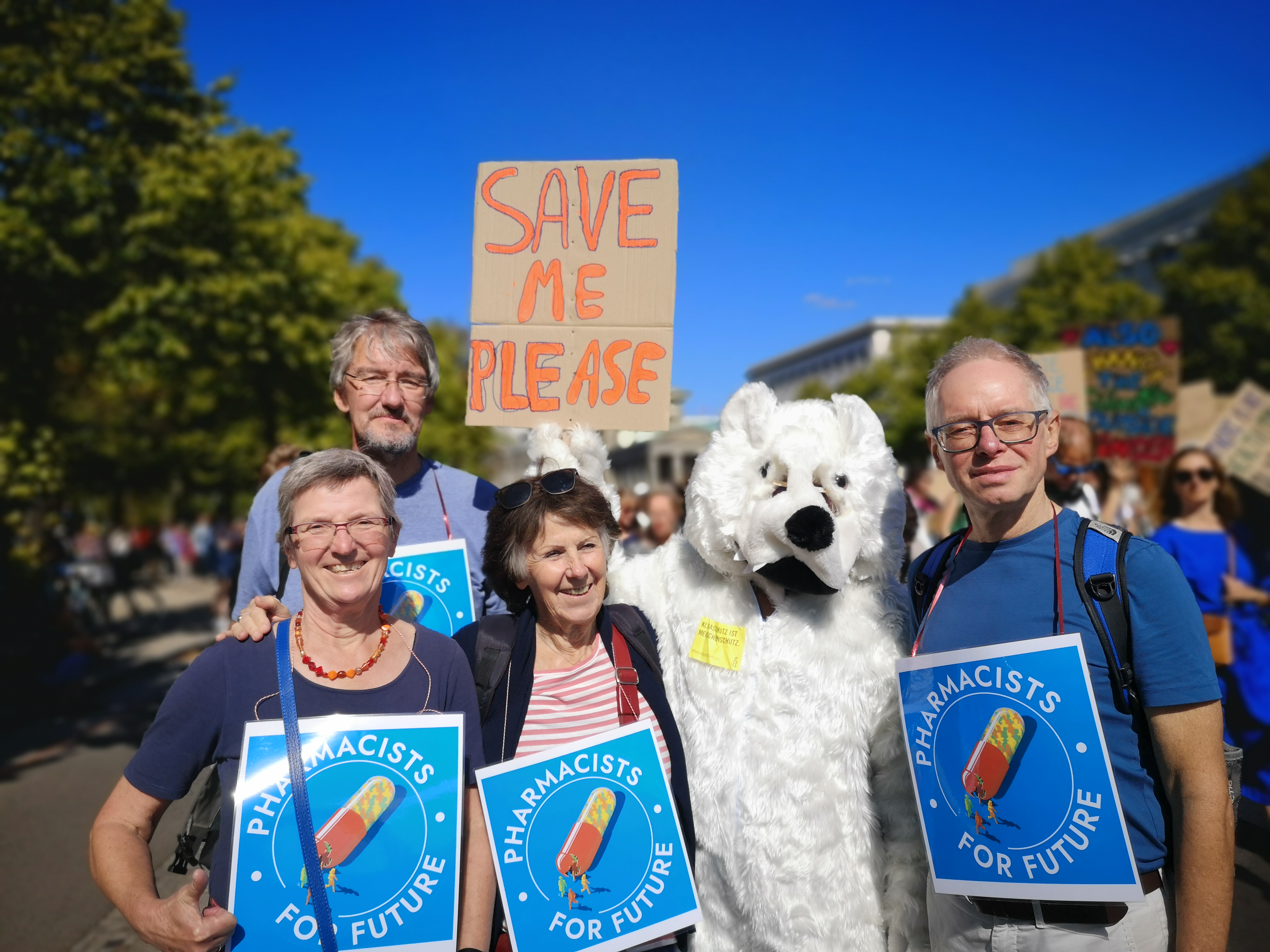
Global climate strike on September 15, 2023.

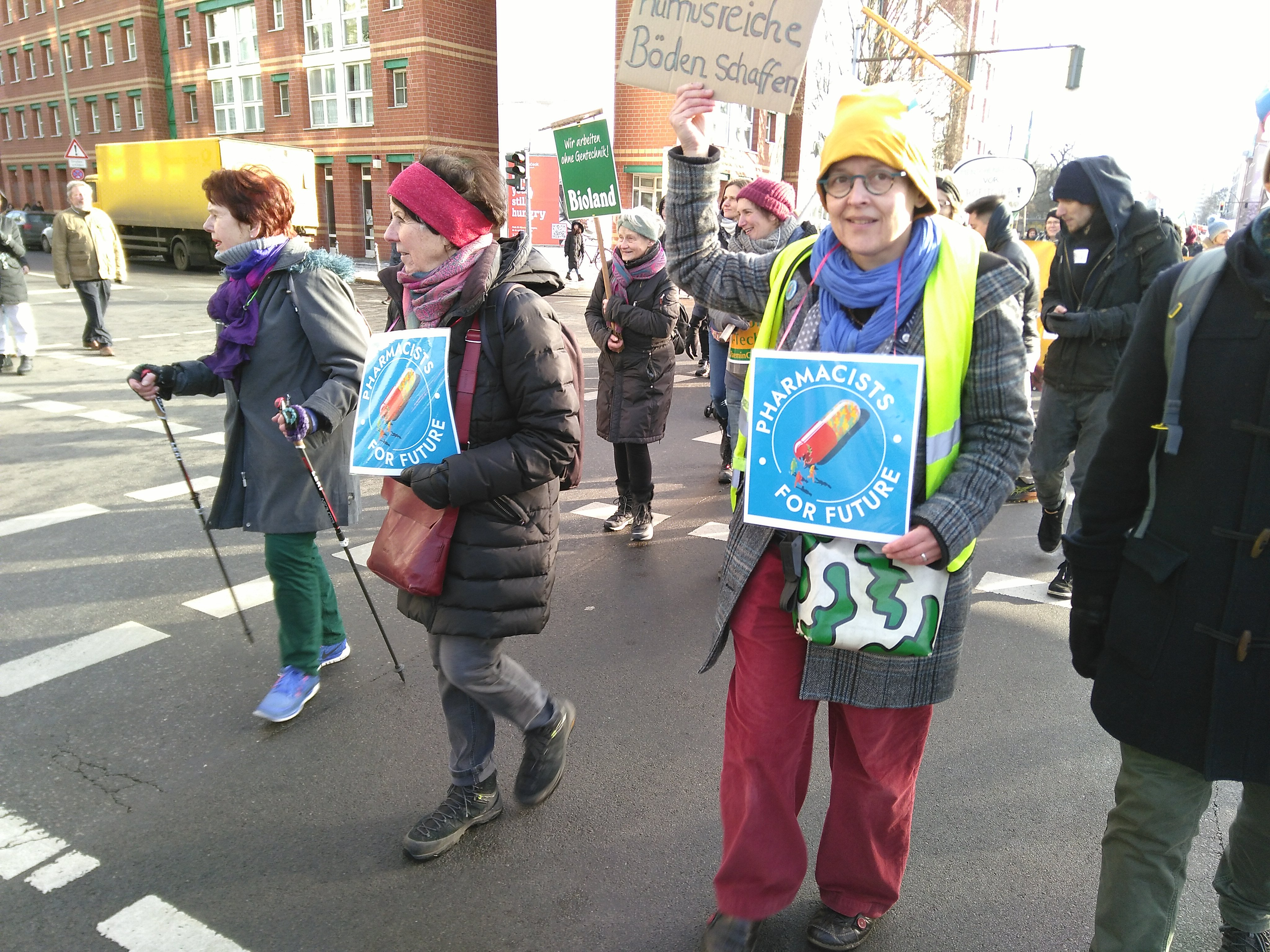
We are fed up! demonstration on January 20, 2024.

Pharmacists for Future actively participate in public protests for environmental protection and the annual climate strikes. In addition, they are present with their own booths at major trade fairs and events such as Expopharm and INTERPHARM.

To promote a planned series of training courses, their efforts were recognized with first place in the jury's award at the Environmental Prize of the Stadtwerke Tübingen in December 2023. This award acknowledges their efforts and commitment to environmental education initiatives.

Due to their expertise and commitment to sustainability in pharmacy, the members of Pharmacists for Future are highly sought-after trainers and speakers for continuing education and seminars, including those organized by the national pharmacists' association and related institutions.
