= Technician (disambiguation) =

A technician is a worker proficient in the skills of a field of technology. It can also refer to a person who is an expert in the practical or technical aspects of a science or art.

Technician may also refer to:

- Technician (horse) (foaled 2016), an Irish Thoroughbred racehorse
- Technician (newspaper), the student newspaper of North Carolina State University
- Technician (United States Army), a U.S. Army enlisted rank 1942–1948
- The Technician (novel), a 2011 novel by Neal Asher
- The Technicians, a 1980s Australian pop group
- Technicians, Tech N9ne's fan base

== See also ==
- Technologist (disambiguation)
