= Shadow of the Scorpion =

2008 science fiction novel by Neal Asher

- Cover for Shadow of the Scorpion
- Author: Neal Asher
- Cover artist: Steve Rawlings
- Language: English
- Series: Ian Cormac
- Genre: Science fiction novel
- Publisher: Tor Books
- Publication date: 2008
- Publication place: United Kingdom
- Media type: Print (Hardback & Paperback)
- Pages: 296
- ISBN: 978-0-230-73859-1
- OCLC: 298597496

Shadow of the Scorpion is a novel by Neal Asher, published by the Macmillan Publishers imprint Tor Books in 2008. The novel introduces Ian Cormac and is therefore a prequel. The novel skips between Cormac's first mission for the ECS (Earth Central Security) and his upbringing as a child.

== Planets ==
- Earth
- Hagren, the setting of the majority of the book
- Patience, the setting of the conclusion of the book

== Spaceships ==
- Pearl - AI controlled Polity transport.
- The Sadist - An AI controlled attack ship.

== Characters ==
- Amistad
- Yallow
- Ian Cormac
- Carl
- Spencer
- Dax Cormac (Ian's older brother)
- Hannah Cormac (Dax and Ian's mother)
- Gorman
- Travis
- Crean
