= Cowl (novel) =

2004 science fiction novel by Neal Asher

- First edition
- Author: Neal Asher
- Cover artist: Steve Rawlings
- Language: English
- Genre: Science fiction
- Publisher: Tor Books
- Publication date: 2004
- Publication place: United Kingdom
- Media type: Print (Hardcover & Paperback)
- Pages: 422
- ISBN: 0-7653-5279-6
- OCLC: 66908092

Cowl is a 2004 science fiction novel by British writer Neal Asher. The novel deals with time travel and an epic time war between two factions from the 43rd century. Asher first started working on the novel as a novella named Cowl At The Beginning, which he eventually developed into the full novel Cowl.

== Plot summary ==
The novel follows Polly, an ordinary homeless teenager from the near future and Tack, a soldier mentally programmed for obedience to his superiors. Tack is tasked to retrieve a "tor", a biological time machine, but it attaches itself to Polly and wrenches her back in time throughout history toward the eponymous Cowl. She meets several major figures in British history but is no closer to discovering the secret behind the tor which is leeching off her energy and life. Meanwhile Tack runs into Traveler, a time traveler, who shows him the future of the human race where the dominant Heliothane race is threatened by the Umbrathane uprising and the battles are being fought throughout time itself. Cowl, a Heliothane weapon is a human male that was genetically engineered to be the perfect specimen of human evolution. However he is also on the run from the Heliothane Dominion, which considers him their enemy after he slaughters the station he was born at. In an attempt to stop the rule of the dominant Heliothanes, Cowl travels back into pre-history with an incomprehensibly massive multidimensional creature called the Torbeast. The Heliothane theorize that Cowl intends to destroy the human race and supplant them with the Umbrathane checking on his progress by having the Torbeast send its parasitic scales into the future which drag its victims back to Cowl.

== Reception ==
Critical reception to Cowl was mostly positive, with fan reaction being mixed. SFRevu praised the novel, citing it as "fast moving". U-T San Diego and the Denver Post both gave positive reviews, with U-T San Diego calling it a "whopping good story". SF Site wrote that while the book was "satisfying simply as an adventure story, Asher's ambition and obvious knowledge of the field suggest that with a little more time for character-development and exploring individual motivations, Cowl could have set new standards for the time-travel novel, instead of settling for being an entertaining up-date of a classic tradition." Kirkus Reviews cited that while the "time-travel rationale holds up ... it’s impossible to understand the motivations of the movers and shakers", which kept them from caring about what happened next. SF Crowsnest wrote that Cowl was initially hard to get into but that the book had a "satisfying climax". January Magazine stated that they were "breathless" from Cowl but that there was "just so much to take in".
