= Over-the-counter drug =

Medication available without a prescription

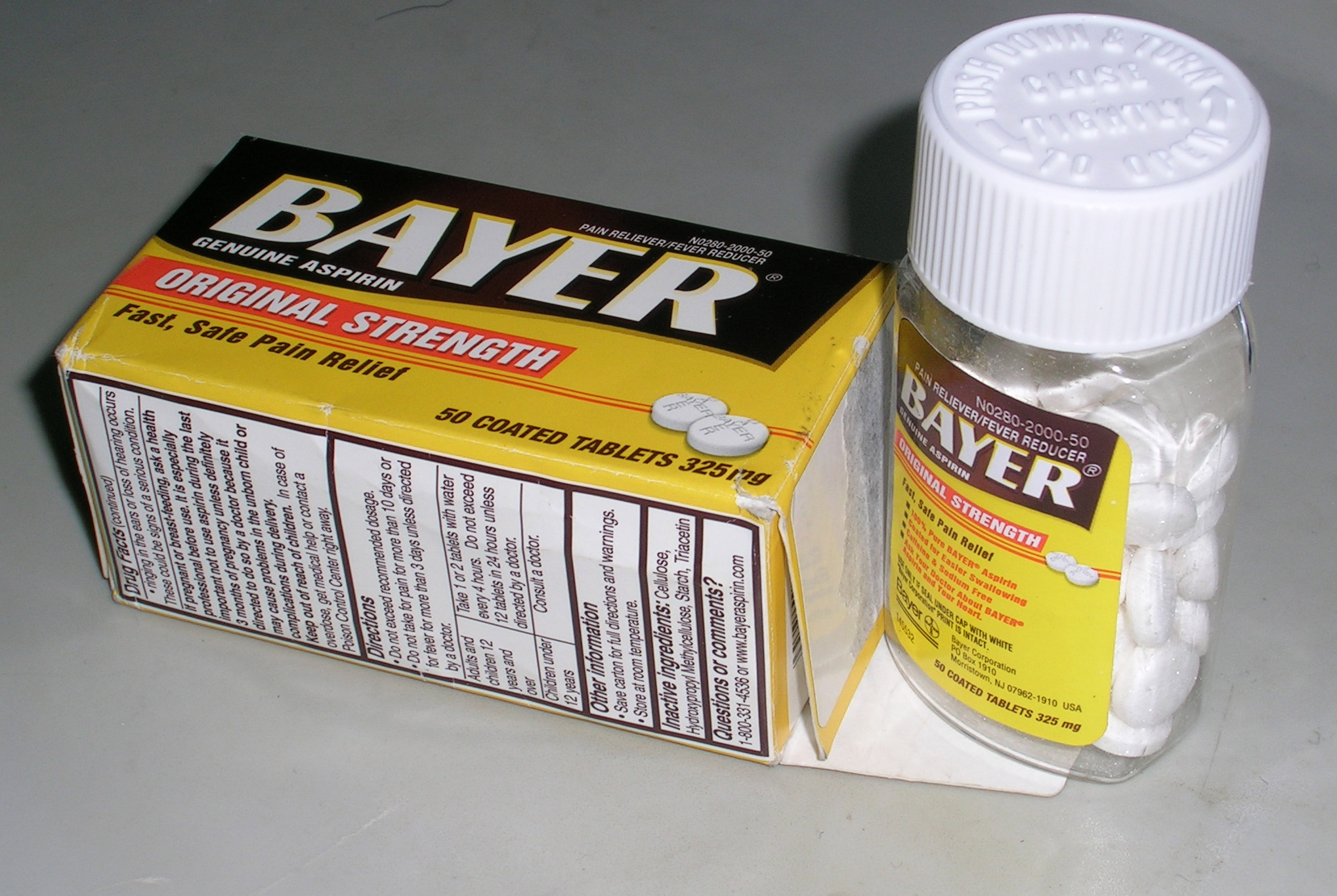
OTC Bayer aspirin with child-resistant packaging (cap) and tamper-resistant carton and innerseal

Over-the-counter (OTC) drugs are medicines sold directly to a consumer without a requirement for a prescription from a healthcare professional, as opposed to prescription drugs, which may be supplied only to consumers possessing a valid prescription (and should only be used by the individual to which it was prescribed). In many countries, OTC drugs are selected by a regulatory agency to ensure that they contain ingredients that are safe and effective when used without a physician's care. OTC drugs are usually regulated according to their active pharmaceutical ingredient (API) and strengths of final products.

Some drugs may be legally classified as over-the-counter (i.e. no prescription is required), but may only be dispensed by a pharmacist after an assessment of the patient's needs or the provision of patient education. Regulations detailing the establishments where drugs may be sold, who is authorized to dispense them, and whether a prescription is required vary considerably from country to country.

== Usage ==
As of 2011, around a third of older adults in the US reportedly used OTC drugs, and this number is increasing. By 2018, the prevalence of use by adults in the U.S. as first-line treatment for minor illnesses had reached 81%: however, there is some debate as to whether this figure relates to an actual improvement of health.

== Regulation by country ==
=== Canada ===
In Canada, there are four drug schedules:

- Schedule 1: Requires a prescription for sale and is provided to the public by a licensed pharmacist.
- Schedule 2: Does not require a prescription but requires an assessment by a pharmacist prior to sale. These drugs are kept in an area of the pharmacy where there is no public access and may also be referred to as "behind-the-counter" drugs.
- Schedule 3: Does not require a prescription but must be kept in an area under the supervision of a pharmacist. These drugs are kept in an area of the retail outlet where self-selection is possible, but a pharmacist must be available to assist in the self-selection of medication if required.
- Unscheduled: Does not require a prescription and may be sold in any retail outlet.

All medications other than Schedule 1 may be considered an OTC drug, as they do not require prescriptions for sale. While the National Association of Pharmacy Regulatory Authorities provides recommendations on the scheduling of drugs for sale in Canada, each province may determine its own scheduling. The drugs found in each schedule may vary from province to province.

=== India ===
In November 2016, India's Drug Consultative Committee announced it was embarking on establishing a definition of drugs which could be dispensed without a prescription. Prior to this, the general assumption was that any drug which did not fall into a prescription schedule could be purchased without a prescription. However, the needed definition had not been enacted by early 2018. The lack of a legal definition for OTC drugs has led to this US$4 billion market segment being effectively unregulated.

=== Netherlands ===
In the Netherlands, there are four categories:

- UR (Uitsluitend Recept): prescription only
- UA (Uitsluitend Apotheek): pharmacist only
- UAD (Uitsluitend Apotheek of Drogist): pharmacist or drugstore only
- AV (Algemene Verkoop): may be sold in general stores

A drug that is UA may be sold OTC but only by pharmacists. The drug can be on the shelves like any other product. Examples are domperidone, 400 mg ibuprofen up to 50 tablets and dextromethorphan. A drug that is UAD can also be sold at drugstores which are stores where no prescription can be filled. The drugs are usually on the shelves, and the store also sells items like toys, gadgets, perfumes and homeopathic products. The drugs in this category have limited risk and addiction potential. Examples are naproxen and diclofenac in small amounts, cinnarizine, 400 mg ibuprofen up to 20 tablets and also 500 mg paracetamol up to 50 tablets. Drugs in the AV category can be sold at supermarkets, gas stations, etc. and include only drugs with minimal risk to the public, like paracetamol up to 20 tablets, 200 mg ibuprofen up to 10 tablets, cetirizine and loperamide.

=== United States ===
In the United States, the manufacture and sale of OTC substances are regulated by the Food and Drug Administration. The FDA requires that all "new drugs" obtain a New Drug Application (NDA) before entering interstate commerce, but the act exempts any drugs generally recognized as safe and effective (GRAS/E). To deal with the vast number of OTC drugs that were already on the market before the requirement that all drugs obtain an NDA, the FDA created the OTC monograph system to review classes of drugs and to categorize them as GRAS/E after review by expert panels. Certain classes of OTC drugs would not be required to obtain an NDA and could remain on the market if they conformed to the monograph guidelines for doses, labeling, and warnings finalized in the Code of Federal Regulations.

Thus, an OTC drug product is allowed to be marketed either (1) pursuant to an FDA monograph or (2) pursuant to an NDA for products that do not fit within a specific monograph. There is also the possibility that certain OTC drug products are marketed under the grandfathering provisions of the Federal Food, Drug, and Cosmetic Act, but the FDA has never formally acknowledged that any legitimate grandfathered OTC drug exists.

Examples of OTC substances approved in the United States are sunscreens, anti-microbial and anti-fungal products, external and internal analgesics such as lidocaine and aspirin, psoriasis and eczema topical treatments, anti-dandruff shampoos containing coal tar, and other topical products with a therapeutic effect.

The Federal Trade Commission regulates advertising of OTC products, in contrast to prescription drug advertising, which is regulated by the FDA.

The FDA requires OTC products to be labeled with an approved "Drug Facts" label to educate consumers about their medications. The labels comply to a standard format and are intended to be easy for typical consumers to understand. Drug Facts labels include information on the product's active ingredient(s), indications and purpose, safety warnings, directions for use, and inactive ingredients.

The 2020 Coronavirus Aid, Relief, and Economic Security Act (CARES Act) includes reforms that modernize the way certain OTC drugs are regulated in the United States. Many OTC monographs need to be updated but updating or changing an OTC monograph requires the slow and burdensome notice-and-comment rulemaking process. The CARES Act includes OTC monograph reform provisions that replace the rulemaking process with an administrative order process.

=== United Kingdom ===
In the United Kingdom, medication is governed by the Human Medicines Regulations 2012. Medication falls into one of three categories:

1. Prescription Only Medication (POM): legally available only with a valid prescription from a prescriber. A pharmacist has to be on the premises for POM medicines to be dispensed, required by law. The medicine has been specifically prescribed for the patient holding the prescription, so it is considered safe for only the recipient to take. examples of these include most antibiotics and all antidepressants or antidiabetic medications. Certain POM medicines are additionally marked Controlled Drug (CD) due to risk of abuse and the possibility of diversion for sale as street drugs. Examples of CDs include all benzodiazepines and strong opioids such as heroin and fentanyl.
2. General Sales List (GSL): available off the shelf, permitted to be sold outside a pharmacy (so they can be sold anywhere, such as supermarkets). In general, they are considered safe for most people when taken correctly. Examples of these include 16-packs (or less) of painkillers such as paracetamol, ibuprofen, and aspirin as well as a host of other medications such as small pack sizes of some antihistamines, some laxative medication, and skin creams. This also includes the recreational substances alcohol and caffeine (where they are included in medicinal products), and some nicotine preparations.
3. Pharmacy Medicine (P): must be bought from a pharmacist only, behind counter. These are medicines that are legally neither a POM or GSL medication. There is no requirement for a prescription, but should not be available for manual self-selection (although directions to discuss a 'P' product may be allocated shelf space with associated GSL items). 'P' medications are reserved from the GSL list as they are either associated with a need for advice on use, or used in conditions which may require referral to a medical prescriber. Suitably trained counter assistants may sell a 'P' medication under the supervision of a pharmacist and will ask questions to determine if the customer needs to be referred for a discussion with a pharmacist. Some 'POM' medicines are available for use in certain situations and doses as 'P' medicines. If it is not appropriate to sell a 'P' medication – i.e. the condition is not suitable for self-management and requires referral to a medical prescriber – then a sale should not occur and the pharmacist has a legal and professional obligation to refer this on to an appropriate service. Examples of these include some sleep aid tablets such as diphenhydramine, human deworming tablets such as mebendazole, painkillers with small amounts of codeine (up to 12.8 mg per tablet), and pseudoephedrine.

Medication available only with a prescription is marked somewhere on the box/container with [POM]. Pharmacy-only products are marked with [P]. A prescription is not required for [P] medicines, and pharmacy sales assistants are required by Royal Pharmaceutical Society codes to ask certain questions, which varies for what the customer says. If they ask for a specific product, the pharmacy assistant must ask "Who is it for?", "How long have you had the symptoms?", "Are you allergic to any medication?", "Are you taking any medication?" ('WHAM' questions). If a customer asks for a remedy, e.g., hay fever, then the '2WHAM questions' must be asked "Who is it for?", "What are the symptoms?", "How long have you had the symptoms?", "Have you taken any action towards your symptoms?", and "Are you taking any other medication?". It is with this information that the pharmacist can halt the sale, if need be. No [POM], [P] or [GSL] products that are stocked in a pharmacy can be sold, dispensed, or pre-made until a responsible pharmacist is signed in and on the premises. Some medication available in supermarkets and petrol stations is sold only in smaller packet sizes. Often, larger packs will be marked as [P] and available only from a pharmacy. Frequently, customers buying larger-than-usual doses of [P] medicines (such as DXM, promethazine, codeine or Gee's Linctus) will be queried, due to the possibility of abuse.

== Transitions between prescription and OTC ==
As a general rule, over-the-counter drugs have to be used primarily to treat a condition that does not require the direct supervision of a doctor and must be proven to be reasonably safe and well tolerated. OTC drugs are usually also required to have little or no abuse potential, although in some areas drugs such as codeine are available OTC (usually in strictly limited formulations or requiring paperwork or identification to be submitted during purchase).

Over time, often 3–6 years, drugs that prove themselves safe and appropriate as prescription medicines may be switched from prescription to OTC. An example of this is diphenhydramine (Benadryl), an anti-histamine which once required a prescription but now is available OTC nearly everywhere. More recent examples are cimetidine and loratadine in the United States (which became available OTC in 1995 and 1997 respectively), and ibuprofen in Australia.

It is somewhat unusual for an OTC drug to be withdrawn from the market as a result of safety concerns, rather than market forces, though it does happen occasionally. For example, phenylpropanolamine was removed from sale in the United States over concern regarding strokes in young women. A study has been done examining consumer's perceptions about the risk of and access to nonprescription medication. The study concluded that a small percentage of consumers prefer having access to medication over potential risks of taking non-prescribed medication. Ranitidine was suspended in multiple markets due to concerns over the presence of the carcinogen N-nitrosodimethylamine (NDMA).

In the United Kingdom, it was announced in February 2007 that Boots the Chemists would try over-the-counter sales of Viagra (sildenafil) in stores in Manchester (previous available as prescription only). Men aged between 30 and 65 could buy four tablets after a consultation with a pharmacist. This was subsequently extended to all pharmacies.

== See also ==
- Child-resistant packaging
- Drug interactions
- Generally recognized as safe and effective
- Generic drug
- Inverse benefit law
- Medical prescription
- Over-the-counter counseling
- Pharmacy
- Ranitidine impurities
- Regulation of therapeutic goods
