= Prador Moon =

2006 science fiction novel by Neal Asher

Prador Moon: A Novel Of The Polity
- First image
- Author: Neal Asher
- Cover artist: Bob Eggleton
- Language: English
- Genre: Science fiction novel
- Publisher: Night Shade Books
- Publication date: 2006
- Publication place: United Kingdom
- Media type: Print (Paperback)
- Pages: 220
- ISBN: 1-59780-052-X
- OCLC: 69863526

Prador Moon is a science fiction novel in Neal Asher's Polity series. It describes the First Contact between the Prador and Polity and some of the battles in the ensuing war.
