= Hilldiggers =

2007 science fiction novel by Neal Asher

- Author: Neal Asher
- Cover artist: Steve Rawlings
- Language: English
- Genre: Science fiction
- Publisher: Pan Macmillan Ltd.
- Publication date: 6 July 2007
- Publication place: United Kingdom
- Media type: Print (Hardcover)
- Pages: 474 (Hardcover 1st edition)
- ISBN: 978-1-4050-5500-0
- OCLC: 85898117

Hilldiggers is a science fiction novel by Neal Asher.

== Plot introduction ==
The novel describes the initial diplomatic contact between the Polity (an AI governed interstellar empire) and the isolated planets of Sudoria and Brumal who had been at war for nearly a century. The inhabitants of these two hostile worlds had to make many changes to their bodies and societies in order to survive, rendering their appearances and attitudes quite different from that of a 'standard' human of the time.

Contact is being made officially by Consul Assessor David McCrooger, a hooper-cum-diplomat from the planet Spatterjay, while the system is secretly observed by a Polity surveillance drone named Tigger.

The Sudorians have also discovered an alien artifact they have nicknamed the "Worm". Research on this artifact enabled the Sudorians to make many technological advances that eventually gave them the upper hand in the conflict, allowing them to win the war with Brumal.

Following the war, the Brumellians were nearly completely wiped out. Over time, the causes of the war began to be questioned in Sudoria as many of the justifications that had been taken for granted started to be doubted.

Much of the story revolves around a conflict between two Sudorian factions; Fleet, who were once the dominant faction during the war, responsible for Sudoria's defence and navy, including the Hilldiggers, and the Orbital Combine, a large alliance of spacestations and other facilities orbiting around Sudoria, who both study and contain the Worm.

=== Explanation of the novel's title ===
The "hilldiggers" are the most powerful weapons in the Sudorian/Brumallian system. Part of the Sudorian Fleet, each of these 2 mile long ships are armed with "gravtech" weapons so powerful they can create new mountain ranges when used against a planetary surface, hence their name. The hilldiggers devastated the surface of Brumal, destroying the majority of Brumellian cities in a near genocidal final assault. After the war, the Hilldiggers remain the most powerful vessels in the Sudorian/Brumallian system.

== Release details ==
- 2007, United Kingdom, Tor UK. ISBN 978-1-4050-5500-0, Pub date July 2007, Hardcover
