= Neal Asher =

British science fiction writer

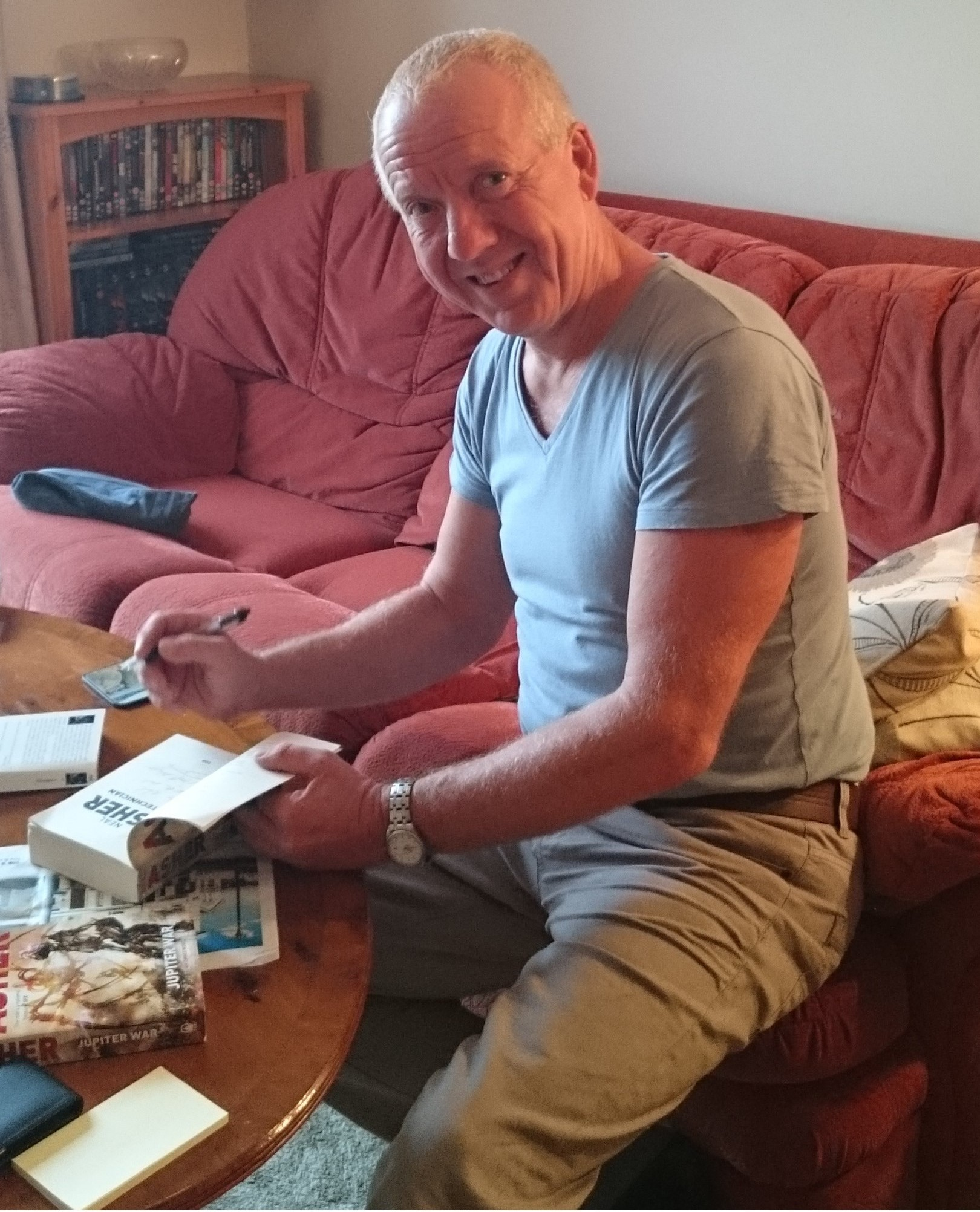
- Born: 4 February 1961 (age 65); Billericay, Essex, England
- Occupation: Novelist
- Writing career
- Period: 2000–present
- Genre: Science fiction
- Website: www.nealasher.co.uk

Neal Asher (born 4 February 1961) is an English science fiction writer. He lives near Chelmsford.

== Career ==
Both of Asher's parents are educators and science fiction fans. Although he began writing speculative fiction in secondary school, he did not turn seriously to writing until he was 25. He worked as a machinist and machine programmer and as a gardener from 1979 to 1987. Asher identifies The Lord of the Rings, The Hobbit and other fantasy work including Roger Zelazny's The Chronicles of Amber series as important early creative influences.

Asher published his first short story in 1989. In 2000 he was offered a three-book contract by Pan Macmillan, and his first full-length novel Gridlinked was published in 2001. This was the first in a series of novels made up of Gridlinked, The Line of Polity, Brass Man, Polity Agent, and Line War.

Asher is published by Tor, an imprint of Pan Macmillan, in the UK, and by Tor Books in the United States.

The majority of Asher's work is set in one future history, the "Polity" universe. It encompasses many classic science fiction tropes including world-ruling artificial intelligences, androids, hive minds and aliens. His novels are characterized by fast-paced action and violent encounters. While his work is frequently epic in scope and thus nominally space opera, its graphic and aggressive tone is more akin to cyberpunk. When combined with the way that Asher's main characters are usually acting to preserve social order or improve their society (rather than disrupt a society they are estranged from), these influences could place his work in the subgenre known as post-cyberpunk.

== Awards ==
- British Fantasy Society Award nomination, 1999, for stories "Sucker" and "Mason's Rats III"
- SF Review Best Book designation, 2002, for The Skinner

== Bibliography ==
=== Polity universe ===
In order of publication

Agent Cormac series

1. Gridlinked. London: Macmillan. 2001. ISBN 0-333-90363-3.
2. The Line of Polity (2003) ISBN 0-333-90365-X
3. Brass Man (2005) ISBN 9781597809801
4. Polity Agent (2006) ISBN 9781597809818
5. Line War (2008) ISBN 9781597805285

Spatterjay series

1. The Skinner (2002) ISBN 9781597809870
2. The Voyage of the Sable Keech (2006) ISBN 9781509868445
3. Orbus (2009) ISBN 9780000074782

Transformation series

1. Dark Intelligence (2015) ISBN 9780330524551
2. War Factory (2016) ISBN 9780330524612
3. Infinity Engine (2017) ISBN 9780330524636

Rise of the Jain

1. The Soldier (May 2018) ISBN 9781509862412
2. The Warship (May 2019) ISBN 9781509862511
3. The Human (April 2020) ISBN 9781509862467

Time's Shadow

1. Dark Diamond (2025) ISBN 9781035037964
2. Dark Agent (2026) ISBN 9781035037889
3. Dark Horizon (2027) ISBN 9781035038039

Standalone novels

- Prador Moon (2006) ISBN 9781509868469
- Hilldiggers (2007) ISBN 9780330441537
- Shadow of the Scorpion (Prequel to Gridlinked, 2008) ISBN 9781509868483
- The Technician (2010) ISBN 9781509868490
- Jack Four (2021) ISBN 9781529049985
- The Bosch (2022) ISBN 9798640862416
- Weaponized (2022) ISBN 9781529050035
- War Bodies (2023) ISBN 9781529050103
- Jenny Trapdoor (2023) ISBN 9798869563392

In internal chronological order

1. Weaponized (2300 CE)
2. Prador Moon (2310 CE)
3. Shadow of the Scorpion (2339 CE)
4. Gridlinked (2434 CE)
5. The Line of Polity (2437 CE)
6. Brass Man (2441 CE)
7. Polity Agent (2443 CE)
8. Line War (2444 CE)
9. The Technician (2457 CE)
10. Dark Intelligence (circa 2500 CE)
11. War Factory (circa 2500 CE)
12. Infinity Engine (circa 2500 CE)
13. The Soldier (circa 2750 CE)
14. The Warship (circa 2750 CE)
15. The Human (circa 2750 CE)
16. The Skinner (3056 CE)
17. The Voyage of the Sable Keech (3078 CE)
18. Orbus (3079 CE)
19. Jack Four
20. Hilldiggers (3230 CE)

=== Owner universe ===
- The Departure (2011) ISBN 9780330457613
- Zero Point (2012) ISBN 9780330524520
- Jupiter War (2013) ISBN 9781509868568
- World Walkers (2024) ISBN 9781035037988

=== Other novels ===
- Mindgames: Fool's Mate (1992) ISBN 1-983095-17-6
- The Parasite (1996) ISBN 1-983095-02-8
- Cowl (2004), Philip K. Dick Award nominee ISBN 9781529002287

=== Short fiction ===
==== Collections ====
- The Engineer (1998) – Contains the novella of the same name and six stories. ISBN 9781901530087
  - The Engineer
  - "Snairls"
  - "Spatterjay"
  - "Jable Sharks"
  - "The Thrake"
  - "Proctors"
  - "The Owner"
- Runcible Tales (1999) ISBN 9781902628240
  - "Always with You" (Polity Universe) (1996)
  - "Blue Holes" (Polity Universe)
  - "Dragon in the Flower" (Polity Universe) (1994)
  - "The Gire & the Bibrat" (Polity Universe)
  - "Walking John & Bird" (Polity Universe)
- The Engineer ReConditioned (2006) – Reprint of The Engineer with three additional stories. ISBN 9780809556144
  - The Engineer
  - "Snairls"
  - "Spatterjay"
  - "Jable Sharks"
  - "The Thrake"
  - "Proctors"
  - "The Owner"
  - "The Tor-Beast's Prison"
  - "Tiger Tiger"
  - "The Gurnard"
- The Gabble: And Other Stories (2008) ISBN 9781509868506
  - "Softly Spoke the Gabbleduck" (Cormac/Gabbleduck)
  - "Putrefactors" (Spatterjay)
  - "Garp and Geronamid" (Spatterjay)
  - "The Sea of Death" (n/a)
  - "Alien Archaeology" (Cormac/Gabbleduck)
  - "Acephalous Dreams" (Polity)
  - "Snow in the Desert" (n/a) — adapted for vol. 2 ep. 4 of adult animated series Love, Death & Robots
  - "Choudapt" (n/a)
  - "Adaptogenic" (Spatterjay)
  - "The Gabble" (Cormac/Gabbleduck)
- Africa Zero (2005) – Contains three novellas. ISBN 9780809556649
  - Africa Zero
  - The Army of God
  - The Sauraman
- Owning the Future: Short Stories (2018) ISBN 978-1983094934
  - "Memories of Earth" (from Asimov's Science Fiction October/November 2013)
  - "Shell Game" (from The New Space Opera 2 2009)
  - "The Rhine's World Incident" (from Subterfuge 2008 and In Space No One Can Hear You Scream 2013)
  - "Owner Space" (from Galactic Empires anthology 2008)
  - "Strood" (from Asimov's Science Fiction December 2004 and Year's Best SF 10 2005)
  - "The Other Gun" (from Asimov's Science Fiction April/May 2013)
  - "Bioship" (from Solaris Book of New Science Fiction 2007)
  - "Scar Tissue"
  - "The Veteran"
- Lockdown Tales (2020) ISBN 9781912950751
  - Lockdown Tales: An introduction
  - "The Relict"
  - "Monitor Logan"
  - "Bad Boy"
  - "Plenty"
  - "Dr. Whip"
  - "Raising Moloch"
- Lockdown Tales II (2023) ISBN 9781914953439
  - Lockdown Tales II: An introduction
  - "Xenovore"
  - "An Alien on Crete"
  - "The Translator"
  - "Skin"
  - "Eels"
  - "The Host"
  - "Antique Battlefields"
  - "Moral Biology"
  - "Longevity Averaging"
- Fantastical (2023) ISBN 9798391984788

==== List of short stories/novellas ====
Title	Year	First published	Reprinted/collected	Notes
"Adaptogenic"	1992	Threads 2	The Gabble and Other Stories (Tor, 2008)	
Mindgames: Fool's Mate	1992			Novella
The Parasite	1996			Novella
Mason's Rats	1999			Novella. Adopted as Episode №7 (Season 3) of Love, Death & Robots
Africa Zero	2001			Originally published as two novellas, Africa Zero and Africa Plus One
"Snow in the Desert"	2002	Spectrum SF 8	Year's Best SF 8 (2003) The Gabble and Other Stories (Tor, 2008)	
"Watch Crab"	2003	Rick Kleffel's The Agony Column		
The Other Gun	2013	Asher, Neal (April–May 2013). "The other gun". Asimov's Science Fiction. 37 (4&5): 14–45.		Novella
"Memories of Earth"	2013	Asher, Neal (October–November 2013). "Memories of Earth". Asimov's Science Fiction. 37 (10–11): 36–41.		An Owner story
