= The Voyage of the Sable Keech =

2006 science fiction novel by Neal Asher

- First edition
- Author: Neal Asher
- Cover artist: Steve Rawlings
- Language: English
- Series: Spatterjay sequence
- Genre: Science fiction novel
- Publisher: Tor
- Publication date: 2006
- Publication place: United Kingdom
- Media type: Print (hardback & paperback)
- Pages: 584
- ISBN: 978-0-330-41160-8
- OCLC: 62344465
- Preceded by: The Skinner
- Followed by: Orbus

The Voyage of the Sable Keech is a 2006 science fiction novel by Neal Asher. It is the second novel in the Spatterjay sequence.

== Premise ==
The story takes place on the planet Spatterjay, a world where the oceans are teeming with dangerous creatures and the humans who live there are infected with a virus that grants them immortality.

The protagonist, Taylor Bloc, is a walking dead man who wants to live again and will do anything to get adulation, power and control. An ancient hive mind has sent an agent to this uncertain world.
