= Orbus (novel) =

2009 science fiction novel by Neal Asher

- First edition
- Author: Neal Asher
- Cover artist: Steve Rawlings
- Language: English
- Series: Spatterjay sequence
- Genre: Science fiction novel
- Publisher: Tor Books
- Publication date: 2009
- Publication place: United Kingdom
- Media type: Print (Hardback & Paperback)
- ISBN: 978-0-230-73705-1
- OCLC: 320406646
- Preceded by: The Voyage of the Sable Keech

Orbus is a 2009 science fiction novel by Neal Asher. It is the third novel in the Spatterjay sequence.
