= The Technicians =

- Origin: Australia
- Genres: Pop rock
- Years active: 1986–1988
- Labels: Powderworks Records, Jade Records

The Technicians were a short lived Australian group formed in the mid-1980s. The group released three singles, two of which peaked inside the Australian top 100.

== Discography ==
=== Singles ===
List of singles, with selected chart positions
Year	Title	Peak chart positions
Year	Title	AUS
"Soldier of Fortune"	1986	—
"Hot for Love"	1987	90
"Clockwork Clown"	1987	96
