= The Line of Polity =

2003 science fiction novel by Neal Asher

- First edition
- Author: Neal Asher
- Cover artist: Steve Rawlings
- Language: English
- Series: Ian Cormac
- Genre: Science fiction novel
- Publisher: Macmillan UK
- Publication date: 2003
- Publication place: United Kingdom
- Media type: Print (Paperback)
- Pages: 560
- ISBN: 0-333-90365-X
- OCLC: 59372751
- Preceded by: Gridlinked
- Followed by: Brass Man

The Line of Polity is a 2003 science fiction novel by Neal Asher. It is the second novel in the Gridlinked sequence. In this novel, Earth Central Security (ECS) agent Ian Cormac is placed at the center of a civil war on the planet Masada, where an elite Theocracy lives in cylindrical habitats in orbit and violently rules over commoners enslaved to laborious agriculture jobs on the planet's surface. To complicate matters, someone has attacked a low-grav Outlinker habitat with a nanomycelium which bears a striking resemblance to that used by Dragon on Samarkand in the previous novel, Gridlinked. Meanwhile, a brilliant Separatist biophysicist has apparently reactivated an extremely ancient relic of technology created by the Jain, an alien species that dropped out of the universe millions of years ago, and commanded forms of technology that the brightest AI minds of the Polity have difficulty comprehending.

== Technology ==
- AI: machine intelligence responsible for planetary management
- runcible: an interstellar teleporter, comparable to the Ramsbotham Jump in Robert A. Heinlein's Tunnel in the Sky
- contra-terrene device or CTD: an anti-matter bomb
- AGC: antigravity carrier anti-gravity vehicle
- Antiphoton Weapon: A proton beam weapon (APW).
- Aug: A brain augmentation device, allowing gridlink-like access to local networks.
- Pulse-gun
- Golem: sophisticated androids, named in numbered series, loaded with an AI mind or the mind of a human recovered from a dead person's "memplant."
- Sparkind: elite human(oid) soldiers
- Autodoc: a semi-intelligent machine with complete knowledge of human physiology and a sophisticated array of surgical tools.
- Chainglass armor and cutting blades: "A glass formed of silicon chain molecules. Depending on heat treatments and various doping techniques, this glass has a range of properties covering just about every material that has preceded it. Chainglass blades can be as hard as diamond and maintain an edge sharper than that of freshly sheared flint, whilst having a tensile strength somewhere above that of chrome steel. Chainglass also lacks the brittleness of its namesake. The substance was the invention of Algin Tenkian, and it made him filthy rich." -Gridlinked: Asher, pg. 142.
- Jain Node: The manifest of inactive Jain Tech is shaped like an ovoid. It is activated by contact with intelligent organic beings.
- Jain Tech: A type of technology believed to be created by an alien race called the Jain. It was made to destroy entire civilizations. Active Jain Tech can control humans, technology, and is even capable of killing AIs and taking over Polity dreadnoughts through the use of nano-technology.
