= The Technician (novel) =

2011 science fiction novel by Neal Asher

- Original cover art from the Macmillan hardback edition
- Author: Neal Asher
- Cover artist: Jon Sullivan
- Language: English
- Genre: Science fiction novel
- Publisher: Pan Macmillan
- Publication date: 4 February 2011
- Publication place: United Kingdom
- Media type: Print (hardback, paperback), eBook
- Pages: 512
- ISBN: 978-0330457620

The Technician is a 2011 science fiction novel by Neal Asher. The story is set on the world of Masada approximately 20 years after the events of The Line of Polity. The title refers to an unusual albino hooder that creates sculptures from the bones of other creatures. The book provides further background on a number of characters that recur in Asher's novels including the hooders and gabbleducks, the black AI Penny Royal, the war drone Amistad and the apparently extinct Atheter race. It is eventually revealed that the gabbleducks are the remains of the Atheter after they reduced themselves to the intelligence of animals to avoid the dangers of Jain technology and the eponymous Technician is an ancient war machine of stupendous power.
