= Over-the-counter counseling =

Pharmaceutical service

Over-the-counter counseling (or OTC counseling) refers to the counseling that a pharmacist may provide on the subject of initiating, modifying, or stopping an over-the-counter (OTC) drug product. OTC counseling requires an assessment of the patient's self-care concerns and drug-related needs. The types of drugs that are involved in OTC counseling are, for example, used to treat self-diagnosable conditions like heartburn, cough, and rashes, though prescription drugs and professional diagnoses are also relevant to the recommendation process.

== Purpose ==
The aim of OTC counseling is to empower patients to take control of their healthcare-related needs for conditions that do not require an appointment with a medical doctor. This benefits the healthcare system by reducing unnecessary physician visits. The pharmacist can also use OTC counseling to ensure the highest likelihood of success for the patient's self-care attempt and minimize the risk of any drug-related problems.

Although OTC drugs are generally regarded as safe for use without a prescription (by definition), medication errors still occur. For example, patients sometimes misuse OTC products by taking larger than recommended doses, in order to bring about symptomatic relief more quickly, or even intentionally abuse them for unlabeled indications. Even when a patient is instructed not to use OTC products without speaking with their primary care physician, patients can still fail to identify products as OTC medications worth avoiding.

== Technique ==
A pharmacist can use both open-ended questions (that start with the word who, what, how, why or where) as well as close-ended questions (that start with the word will, can, do or did) which are to be used only if the former do not get the appropriate response in order to obtain relevant information about a patient's potential needs for treatment or potential drug-therapy problems.

Pharmacists ask patients about comorbidities to avoid any drug-disease state contraindications.

=== Formal frameworks ===
Although OTC counseling does not necessarily involve the use of a formal framework, various frameworks have been proposed:

==== QuEST ====
The QuEST approach has been described as both "short" and "systematic." It takes the form of the following:

- Qu : Quickly and accurately assess the patient (via SCHOLAR)
- E : Establish appropriateness for self-care
- S : Suggest appropriate self-care strategies
- T : Talk with the patient

==== SCHOLAR ====
- S : Symptoms
- C : Characteristics
- H : History
- O : Onset
- L : Location
- A : Aggravating factors
- R : Remitting factors

==== SCHOLAR-MAC ====
As above, with the following addition:

- M : Medications
- A : Allergies
- C : Conditions

==== WWHAM ====
The WWHAM method is not strict; there is no requirement that the OTC counseling follow the exact order of the mnemonic. It takes the form of the following:

- W : Who is the patient
- W : What are the symptoms
- H : How long have the symptoms been present
- A : Action taken
- M : Medication being taken

==== ASMETHOD ====
The ASMETHOD has been attributed to the London pharmacist, Derek Balon. It takes the form of the following:

- A : Age/appearance
- S : Self or someone else
- M : Medication
- E : Extra medicines
- T : Time persisting
- H : History
- O : Other symptoms
- D : Danger symptoms

==== ENCORE ====
The ENCORE method helps pharmacists focus intently on the patient's presenting symptoms while considering the appropriate OTC recommendation. It takes the form of the following:

- E : Explore

- N : Nature of the symptoms
- O : Obtain the identity of the patient
- C : Concurrent medications
- E : Exclude the possibility of a serious disease
- O : Other associated symptoms

- N : No medication; consider a non-pharmacological approach as appropriate
- C : Care

- G : Geriatric patient
- P : Pediatric patient
- P : Pregnant women
- L : Lactating mothers

- O : Observe

- O : Other tell-tale signs of the condition
- D : Demeanor of the patient
- D : Dramatization by the patient

- R : Refer

- P : Potentially serious case of the disease
- P : Persistent symptoms (or failure of previous therapy)
- P : Patients at increased risk (e.g. diabetic patients with a wound on the underside of the foot)

- E : Explain your recommendation

==== SIT DOWN SIR ====
- S : Site or location of a sign/symptom
- I : Intensity or severity
- T : Type or nature
- D : Duration
- O : Onset
- W : With (other symptoms)
- N : Annoyed or aggravated by
- S : Spread or radiation
- I : Incidence or frequency
- R : Relieved by

== Subject areas ==
=== Proton-pump inhibitors ===
For the selection of OTC proton-pump inhibitors (PPIs), pharmacists must first determine whether or not a patient is likely to benefit from self-care for the treatment of their acid reflux symptoms. Examples of exclusions to self-care treatment of acid-reflux symptoms include a positive family history of gastrointestinal cancers, since their symptoms may reflect a more serious, underlying condition, and patients that present with so-called "alarm symptoms," which require a prompt evaluation by a diagnostician.

The available PPIs labeled for OTC use varies by country. As of October 2015, in the United States, available OTC proton-pump inhibitors include omeprazole, lansoprazole, and esomeprazole, whereas the UK approves the OTC use of omeprazole, esomeprazole, pantoprazole, and rabeprazole.

=== Dietary supplements ===
Whether or not pharmacists should be involved with selling dietary supplements, which are not approved for the treatment or prevention of any disease or disorder, is the subject of much ethical debate. However, a 2009 review of the literature found that the common perception was that pharmacists should be involved in the OTC counseling process for dietary supplements where dietary supplements are sold. As experts in drug therapies that cause vitamin depletion, there are several recommendations that pharmacists commonly make. For example, pharmacists sometimes advise patients on long-term metformin therapy to supplement with vitamin B12 to treat or prevent diabetic peripheral neuropathy.

=== Cancer ===
While there are currently no OTC medications available for the treatment of cancer in the United States, there are specific OTC recommendations that apply to cancer patients that do not apply to the general population. Even a common OTC medication like acetaminophen may pose a risk to cancer patients by masking the presence of fever, which is an important sign of a serious side effect of some chemotherapy regimens called febrile neutropenia.

=== Upper respiratory tract infections ===
During OTC counseling, pharmacists differentiate between self-care appropriate upper respiratory tract infections, like the common cold, and potentially devastating infections like the flu.

=== Urinary incontinence ===
Pharmacists can offer non-pharmacological, behavioral counseling for patients with urinary incontinence. This includes teaching patients about the important behavioral interventions that can reduce their symptoms and improve quality of life. This can include recommending daily Kegel exercises, and instructing patients on the proper technique. In addition, pharmacists can provide resources for patients to learn more about how to control their symptoms. In terms of medications, pharmacists can help patients identify medications that may be worsening or causing their urinary incontinence, or offer recommendations for prescription medications for patients to take to their physicians.

== Comparison to prescription drug counseling ==
OTC counseling patients about self-care and non-prescription drugs does not follow the same format as counseling for prescription drugs. A pharmacist who counsels for a prescription drug can view a patient's profile, which includes their current list of concurrent medications and allergies to medications. However, an OTC counseling session may occur in the aisle of the store, forcing pharmacists to elicit the necessary information from patients directly.
