= Gridlinked =

2001 science fiction novel by Neal Asher

- First edition
- Author: Neal Asher
- Cover artist: Steve Rawlings/Debut Art
- Language: English
- Series: Ian Cormac
- Genre: Science fiction
- Publisher: Pan Books
- Publication date: 2001
- Publication place: United Kingdom
- Media type: Print (hardback & paperback)
- Pages: 522
- ISBN: 0-330-48433-8
- OCLC: 48487054
- Followed by: The Line of Polity

Gridlinked is a science fiction novel by British writer Neal Asher. His first novel, it was published by the Macmillan Publishers imprint Pan Books in 2001. It contains elements of the technological inventiveness of hard science fiction with a more contemporary political plotline. The novel follows the exploits of Earth Central Security agent Ian Cormac, as he attempts to discover who or what is behind the destruction of the Runcible on a remote colony. Cormac drops an investigation into Polity separatists on Cheyne III, and takes the starship Hubris to the ruined world of Samarkand to directly oversee the investigation there. Having been directly "gridlinked" to the Polity A.I. network for too long, Cormac has been slowly losing his humanity, and takes the opportunity of this particular mission to disconnect and solve the mystery the old-fashioned way.

== Plot summary ==
The book follows two main narrative threads: one which follows the exploits of Ian Cormac, a 007-like agent from ECS (Earth Central Security), and another thread which follows the story of Arian Pelter and his band of Separatists from Cheyne III. Cormac is internally "gridlinked" to the ECS AI grid, allowing him realtime mental access and control to most devices on the ECS network. The book opens with a Runcible disaster on the ice planet Samarkand, which was in the process of being terraformed by the energy the Runcible produces. The incident destroys a significant area of the planet's surface, while the loss of Runcible heat output plunges the rest of the planet into unsurvivable temperature ranges. On Cheyne III, Cormac has infiltrated the Separatists by becoming the lover of Angelina Pelter – sister of Arian Pelter. She and Arian have become suspicious of Ian, primarily due to his increasingly inhuman perspective on human affairs, a problem induced by years of being gridlinked. Cormac is forced to kill Angelina and dispose of her body at sea. After a chase across the city, Arian and his main henchman John Stanton have a shootout with Cormac, during which Arian receives a serious facial injury, and Cormac is called away to look into the Samarkand incident, leaving Arian and his crew at large.

Cormac takes a space shuttle to Cereb, the location of the nearest Runcible. While in flight, he runs into Horace Blegg, who briefs him on the Samarkand mission. Blegg informs him that the Samarkand incident was no accident, and also suggests that Cormac disconnect his gridlink, as he has been connected for too long a period of time and is becoming dehumanized. Upon his arrival to Cereb, Cormac takes a Runcible to Minostra, where he boards the starship Hubris for a voyage to Samarkand, where they will conduct an investigation and install a new Runcible. At Samarkand, they discover a not-quite-sane submind of the destroyed Runcible AI. After investigating a heat source at a remote outpost, they find two alien creatures able to live in the extreme conditions. Cormac calls them "dracomen", and recognizes them as the products of Dragon, an alien entity he encountered decades ago on Aster Colora; they bring the dracomen back to the Hubris. Subsequent probing of the Runcible site reveals that the Runcible buffers were sabotaged by a nanomycelium, which is still present, endangering the installation of a new Runcible. They also quickly learn that the dracomen have brought the nanomycelium aboard the Hubris, and certain sections of the ship begin to dissolve; the dracomen also inform Cormac that Dragon is on his way. The Hubris AI starts to manufacture and deploy nanomycelium counteragents, both on ship and on the surface of Samarkand. Subsequently, a tunnel is discovered in a remote area of Samarkand which is clearly not of natural origin. Cormac leads a small team to investigate, who, finding that the tunnel is guarded by a large robot, engage in combat that destroys the creature and leads to the death of one man. At the bottom of the shaft they find an empty artefact made of adamantium. The Hubris is attacked by Dragon (actually part thereof, Dragon having disconnected its four component spheres some time previously), who forcibly takes the dracomen. A discussion with Dragon indicates that the artefact held something called Maker, which Dragon claims was responsible for the nanomycelium, and which is now missing from the planet. Dragon allows the crew to install the Runcible; Cormac uses the new Runcible AI to query the old Samarkand submind, and is able to conclude that Maker left Samarkand before the Runcible incident—its destination Viridian. Cormac decides to follow through the new Runcible, taking the two dracomen along.

Meanwhile, back on Cheyne III, Pelter and Stanton have been repaired by black-market surgeon Sylac, and Arian has had a particularly hideous augmentation (an "aug") installed in his head. Pelter becomes obsessed with finding and killing Cormac after recovering his sister's headless body. They then pull the deranged golem, Mr. Crane, out of storage and escape from Cheyne III on a smuggling ship piloted by Jarvellis. Although Pelter intends to press on to Samarkand, he first makes port at Huma to pick up the necessary weaponry. They find many of the inhabitants on Huma wearing a new type of aug created by a company known as DragonCorp, and Pelter and his crew are all outfitted with them, except for Stanton. While the new aug feeds Pelter additional information about Cormac, he finds it battling with his old one. The Pelter gang is soon acquired and tracked by a group of ECS agents; Pelter and his crew take out the agents one-by-one, including their golem Twenty agent — who is no match for the golem Twenty-five Mr. Crane. Communicating directly with Dragon through his new aug, Pelter is told that he will find Cormac on Viridian.

Back on Viridian, Cormac makes his way to the Magadar forest, the last known coordinates of Maker, taking a small group of planetary regulars with him. Pelter and his crew glide down to Viridian in a chameleonware dropship, evading the notice of the Viridian AI. Pelter determines Cormac's location by bribing some members of the planetary army. A protracted battle then takes place in the forest; Cormac's crew kills Pelter's crew, the golems Cento and Aiden take out Mr. Crane, and Cormac drills a hole through Pelter's head with his thin-gun. Able to focus on Maker, he detonates a CTD, forcing Maker back toward the Viridian Runcible. Cormac passes through first, deliberately damaging the Samarkand Runcible buffers with a proton weapon, and after flying out of range observes the obliteration of the Samarkand Runcible as the Maker presumably passes through.

There is no explanation as to the Maker, its origins or motivations. There is no explanation as to why the Maker followed Cormac and crew through the Runcible or why Cormac damaged the new runcible on Samarkand. Not finished, Cormac takes a dracoman to the Hubris, seals him in an isolation chamber, and leaves orbit. Infuriated, Dragon follows, attacks the ship, and pulls the chamber out. After putting distance between the Hubris and Dragon, Cormac presses a button, igniting the CTD stored in the chamber, taking out Dragon. Maker then comes through the Runcible for real, and congratulates Cormac on finding the true saboteur of the Samarkand Runcible.

== Ending ==
Those who are confused by the ending can find a more detailed account in the "Gridlinked" entry on the author's website, under "The alternative scooby ending can be found here."

== Technology ==
- AI: machine intelligence responsible for planetary management
- Runcible: an interstellar teleporter, comparable to the Ramsbotham Jump in Robert A. Heinlein's Tunnel in the Sky
- contra-terrene device or CTD: an anti-matter bomb
- AGC: antigravity carrier anti-gravity vehicle
- Antiphoton Weapon: A proton beam weapon (APW).
- Aug: A brain augmentation device, allowing gridlink-like access to local networks.
- Proton Gun
- Pulse-gun
- Golem: sophisticated androids, named in numbered series
- Sparkind: elite human(oid) soldiers
- Chainglass armor and cutting blades: "A glass formed of silicon chain molecules. Depending on heat treatments and various doping techniques, this glass has a range of properties covering just about every material that has preceded it. Chainglass blades can be as hard as diamond and maintain an edge sharper than that of freshly sheared flint, whilst having a tensile strength somewhere above that of chrome steel. Chainglass also lacks the brittleness of its namesake. The substance was the invention of Algin Tenkian, and it made him filthy rich." -Gridlinked: Asher, pg. 142.

== Planets ==
- Earth
- Cheyne III, home world of the Separatist movement
- Huma
- Minostra
- Samarkand II, way station between more important worlds, 173 light years from Viridian. Colony destroyed after Runcible exploded.
- Viridian, 173 light years from Samarkand II, in the Mendax planetary system of the Chirat star cluster

== Spaceships ==
- The Hubris - AI controlled Polity Science Vessel. This ship was used to transport a new stage one Runcible to Samarkand.
- The Lyric - A smuggling ship that transports Arian Pelter and his crew to the planets Huma and Viridian.

== Characters ==
- Horace Blegg - immortal Japanese mastermind said to have survived the 1945 atomic bombing of Hiroshima. The highest ranking human in ECS, capable of many feats thought impossible. 400 years old.
- Ian Cormac - the protagonist, an agent the Earth Central AI or Prime Cause
- Arian Pelter - the chief villain, a Separatist/Terrorist
- Angelina Pelter - a Separatist, sister of the chief villain and the victim of a state sanctioned extra-judicial killing by Cormac
- Hubris - AI controlling mind of the research vessel Hubris
- John Stanton - a criminal underling of Pelter, who begins questioning his leadership
- Jarvellis - Stanton's pregnant love interest and spaceship pilot/smuggler
- Maker - an energy-based life form
- Dragon - a living, alien probe constructed and deployed by Maker. Consists of 4 kilometer-wide flesh-coloured spheres.
- Mr. Crane - a two and a half meter tall psychotic (modified Golem Twenty-Five) android controlled by Arian Pelter
- Aiden - Teutonic Sparkind Golem Thirty android
- Cento - Mediterranean Sparkind Golem Thirty android
- Corlackis - Pelter underling, brother of Mennecken
- Mennecken - Pelter underling, brother of Corlackis
- Dusache - Pelter underling
- Svent - Pelter underling
- Sylac - helps heal Stanton and Pelter after fight with Cormac
- Tull
- Veltz - captain of the boat chartered by Arian Pelter to find the remains of his sister.
- Geneve - one of Veltz's crew
- Carn - small monkeylike man, technician/engineer
- Chaline Scientist responsible for installing replacement Samarkand runcible
- Gant - Sparkind soldier who accompanies Cormac to the surface of Samarkand
- Thorn - Sparkind soldier in the Samarkand landing party
