= History of cannabis in Italy =

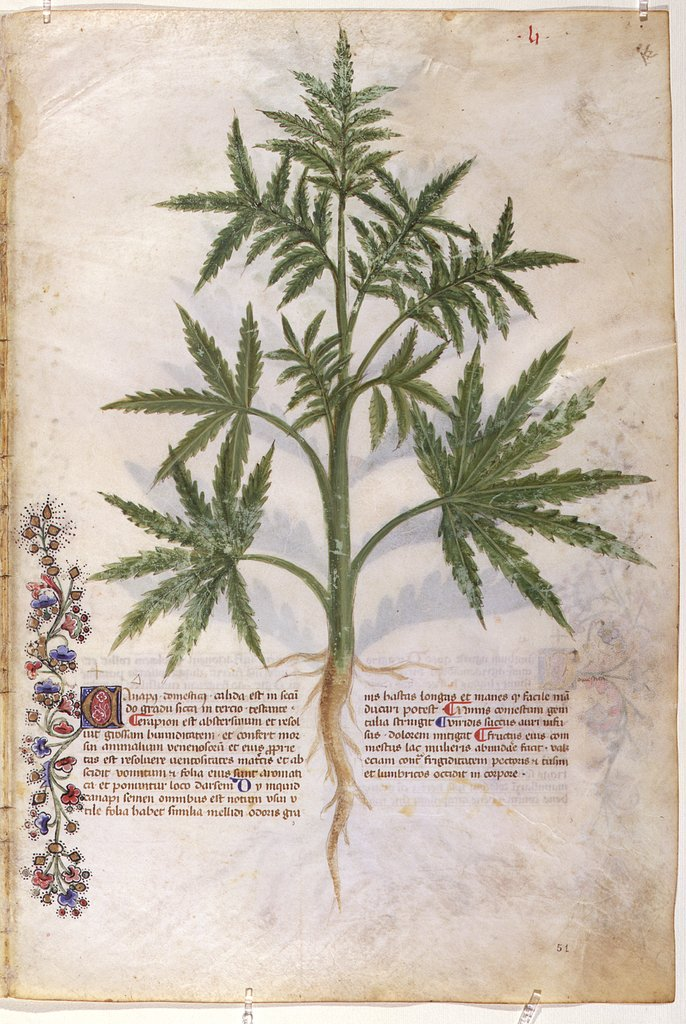
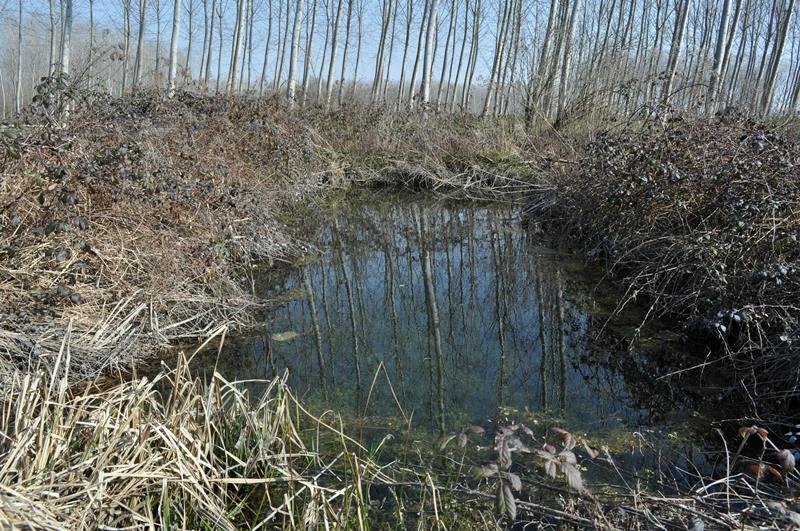
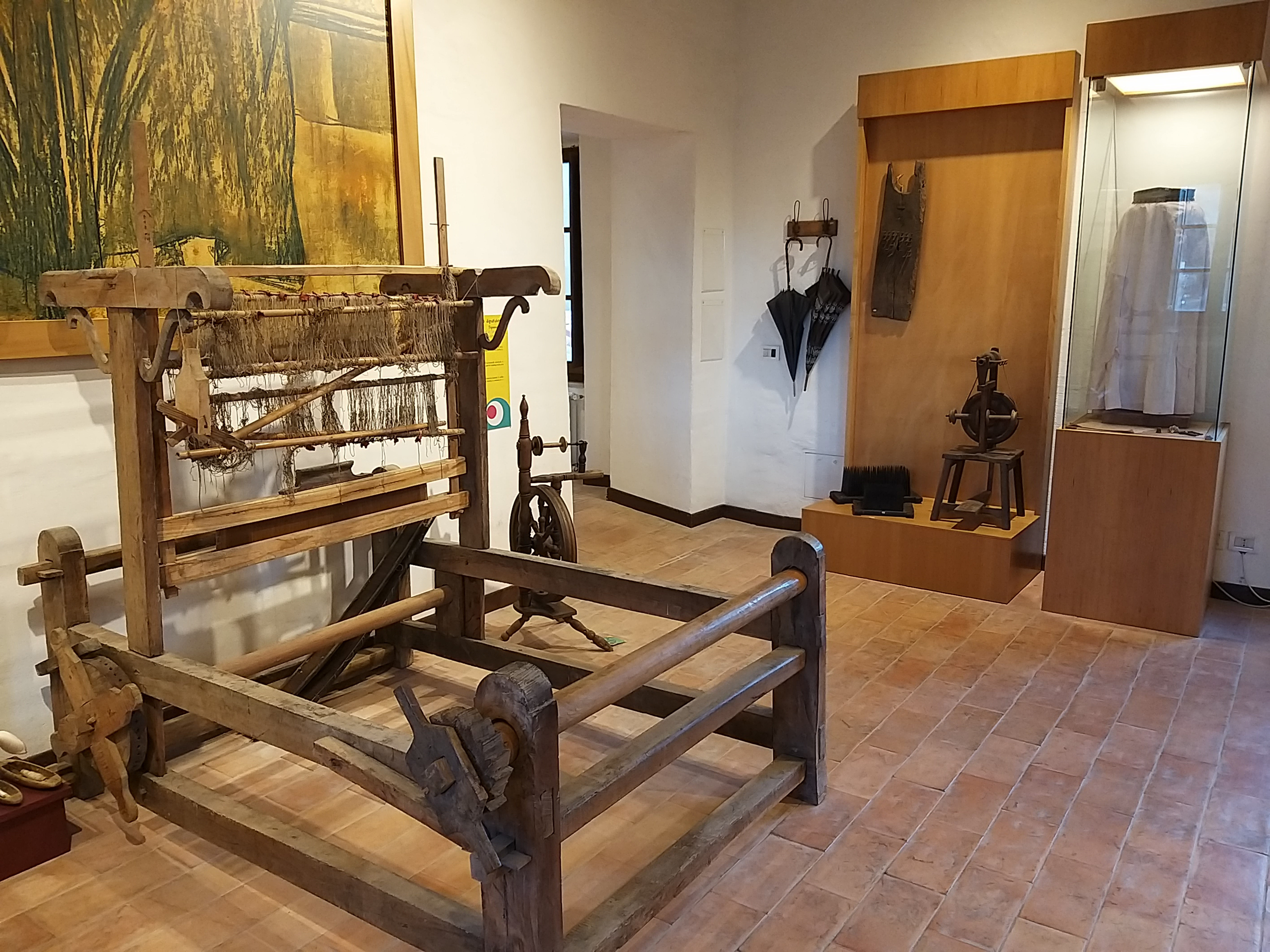
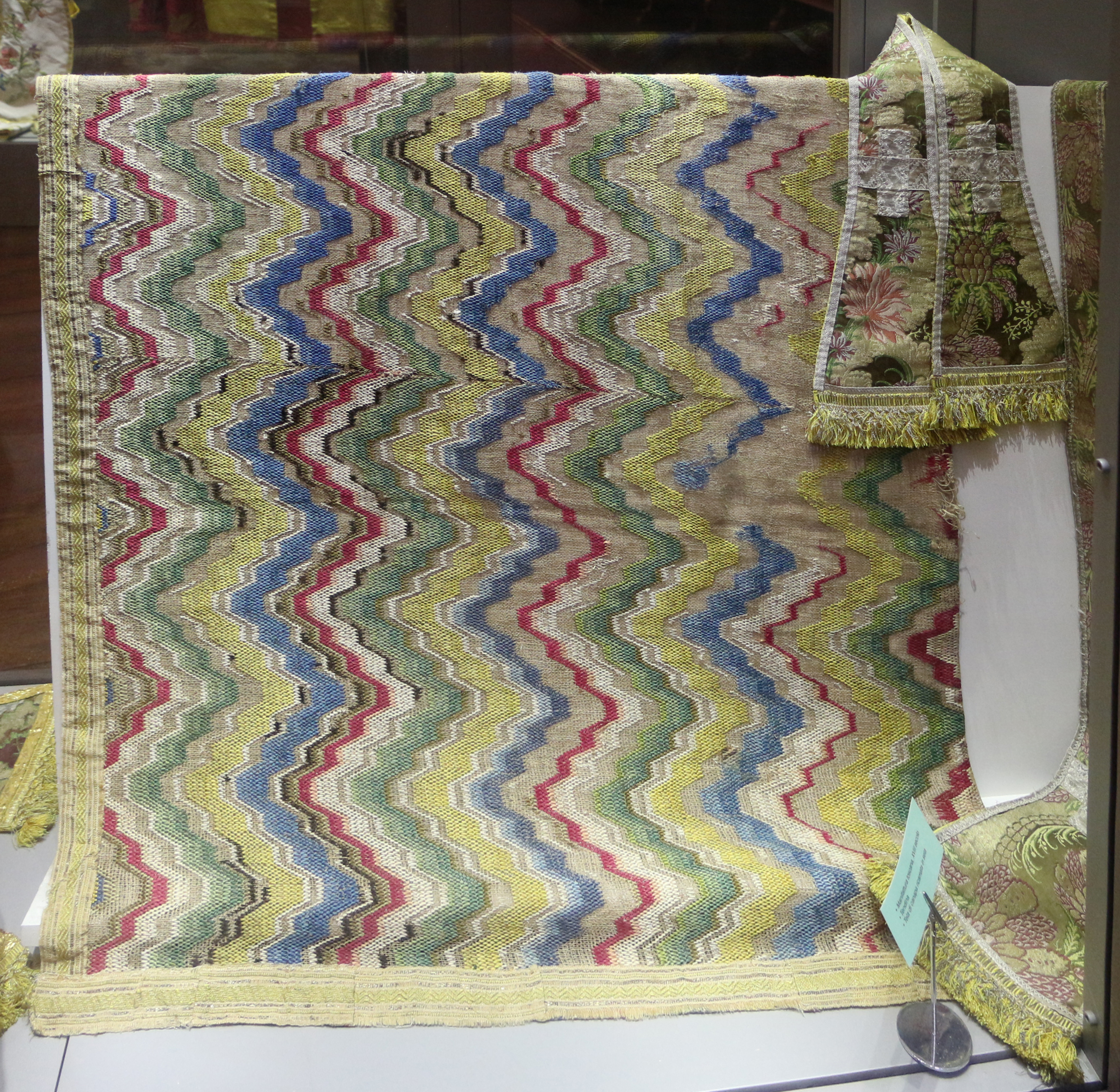
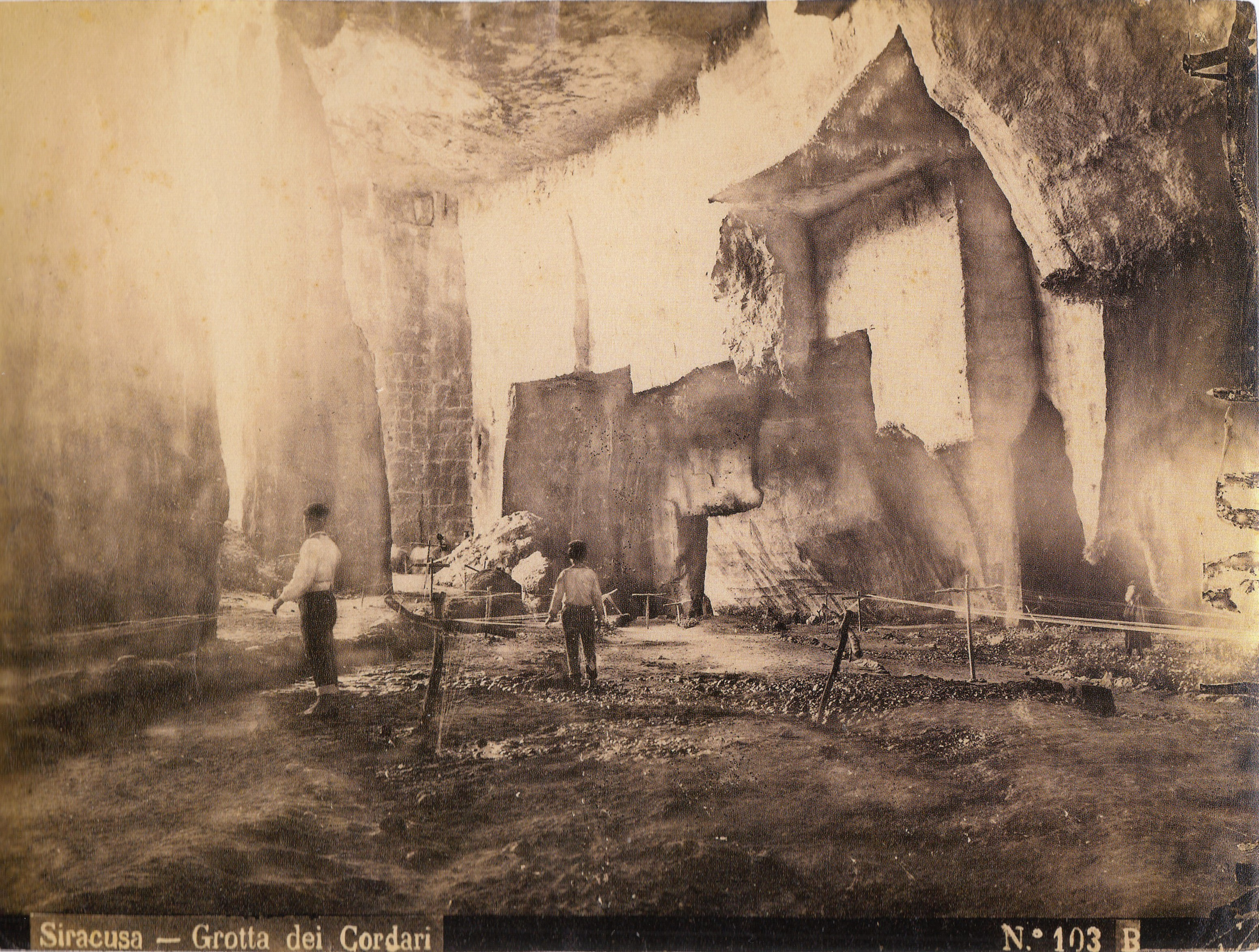
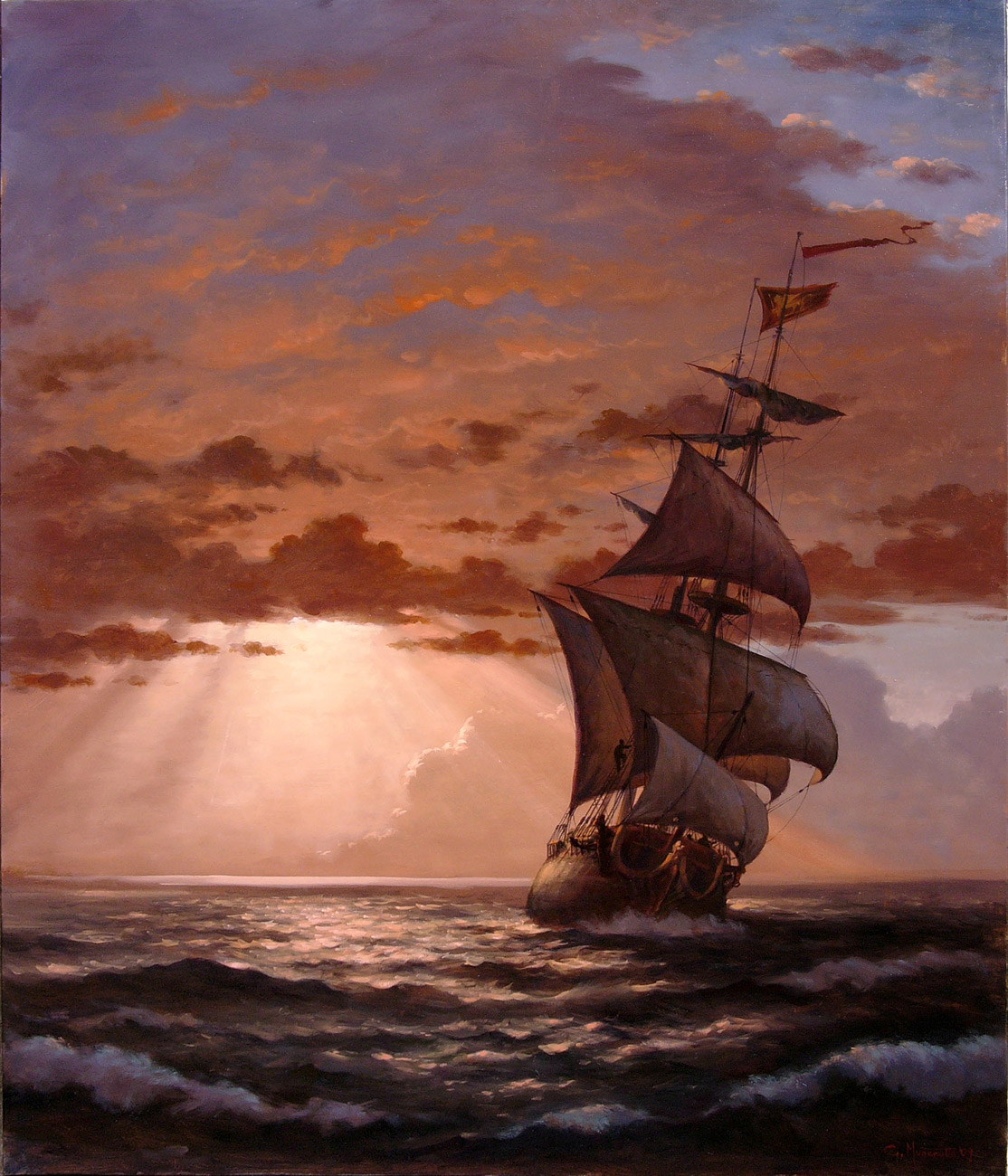
Images depicting (A) a cannabis plant illustration from a 14th-century medical treatise, kept at the Biblioteca Casanatense in Rome; (B) the remains of an open-air tank previously used for the retting of hemp stalks in Cercenasco, Piedmont; (C) a museum room dedicated to traditional hemp-processing tools in Lazio; (D) an 18th-century silk-embroidered hemp curtain from Tuscany; (E) the Cave of the Ropemakers in Sicily in 1900; and (F) a 30-gun Venetian light frigate returning from the Levant.

The cultivation of cannabis in Italy has a long history dating back to Roman times, when it was primarily used to produce hemp ropes, although pollen records from core samples show that Cannabaceae plants were present in the Italian Peninsula since at least the Late Pleistocene, while the earliest evidence of their use dates back to the Bronze Age. For a long time after the fall of Rome in the 5th century A.D., the cultivation of hemp, although present in several Italian regions, mostly consisted in small-scale productions aimed at satisfying the local needs for fabrics and ropes. Known as canapa in Italian, the historical ubiquity of hemp is reflected in the different variations of the name given to the plant in the various regions, including canape, càneva, canava, and canva (or canavòn for female plants) in northern Italy; canapuccia and canapone in the Po Valley; cànnavo in Naples; cànnavu in Calabria; cannavusa and cànnavu in Sicily; cànnau and cagnu in Sardinia.

The mass cultivation of industrial cannabis for the production of hemp fiber in Italy really took off during the period of the Maritime Republics and the Age of Sail, due to its strategic importance for the naval industry. In particular, two main economic models were implemented between the 15th and 19th centuries for the cultivation of hemp, and their primary differences essentially derived from the diverse relationships between landowners and hemp producers. The Venetian model was based on a state monopoly system, by which the farmers had to sell the harvested hemp to the Arsenal at an imposed price, in order to ensure preferential, regular, and advantageous supplies of the raw material for the navy, as a matter of national security. Such system was particularly developed in the southern part of the province of Padua, which was under the direct control of the administrators of the Arsenal. Conversely, the Emilian model, which was typical of the provinces of Bologna and Ferrara, was strongly export-oriented and it was based on the mezzadria farming system by which, for instance, Bolognese landowners could relegate most of the production costs and risks to the farmers, while also keeping for themselves the largest share of the profits.

From the 18th century onwards, hemp production in Italy established itself as one of the most important industries at an international level, with the most productive areas being located in Emilia-Romagna, Campania, and Piedmont. The well renowned and flourishing Italian hemp sector continued well after the unification of the country in 1861, only to experience a sudden decline during the second half of the 20th century, with the introduction of synthetic fibers and the start of the war on drugs, and only recently it is slowly experiencing a resurgence.

== Prehistory ==
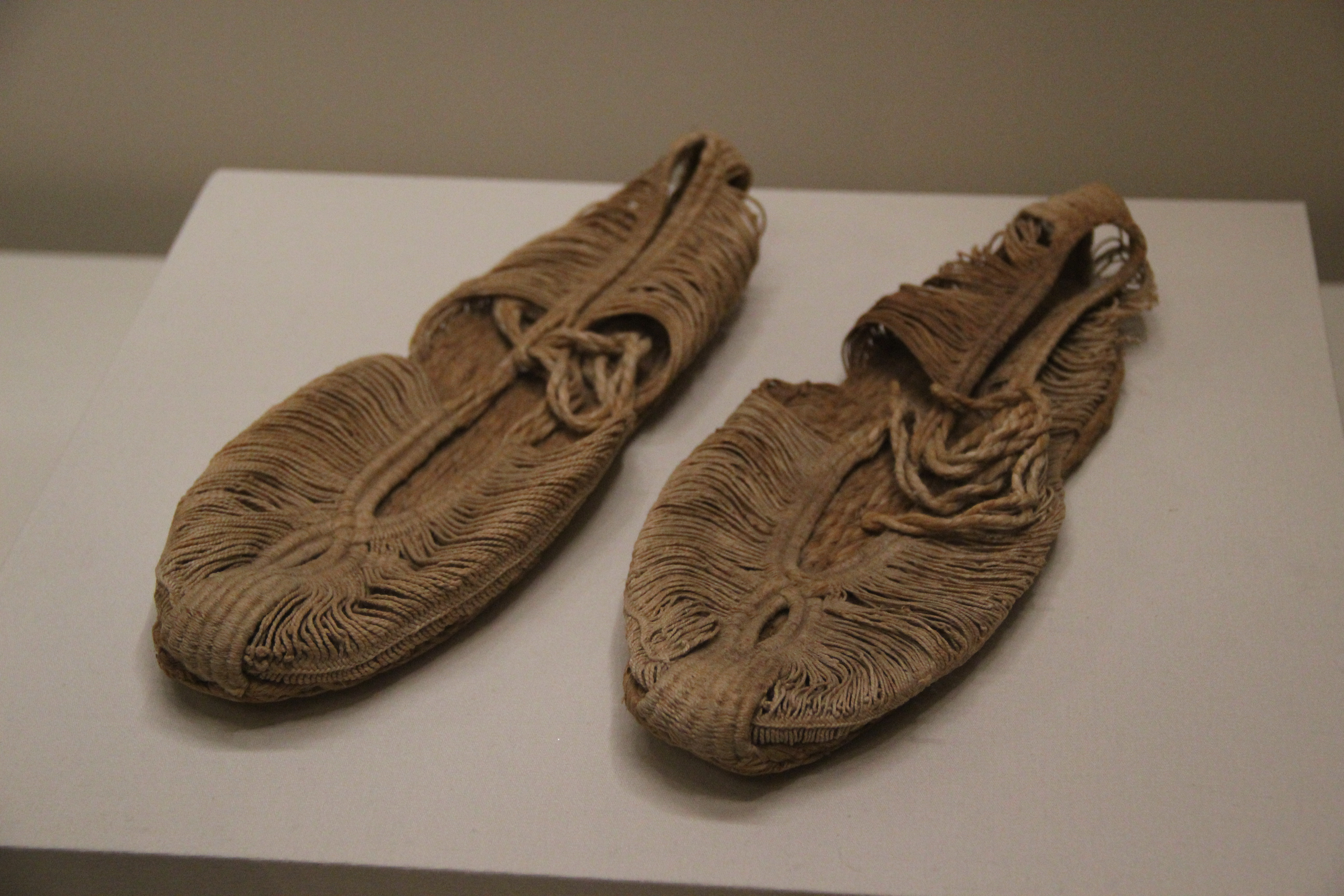
A pair of ancient hemp shoes from Xinjiang, China, exhibited at the National Museum of China in Beijing.

The family of Cannabaceae includes the two genera of cannabis and humulus, with the former believed to be native exclusively to Asia, while the latter also to Europe. In particular, while humulus naturally dispersed from Asia to Europe without human agency, cannabis is commonly thought to have been spread by humans once its multiple uses, most importantly those involving its fiber, had been discovered and developed by the various cultures. At present, cannabis sativa is classified as an archaeophyte alien species for Italy, with sporadic wild occurrences being attributed to escaped plants, which are non-naturalized and distinct from the wild oriental varieties.

According to Greek historian and geographer Herodotus, the Scythians brought hemp from Central Asia to Europe during their migrations around 1500 B.C., while the Teutons were a major factor in the spread of the cultivation of hemp throughout Europe. Another proposed theory is that hemp may have been introduced into the continent by the earliest incursions of the Aryans into Thrace and Western Europe, although no evidence of its presence was found in the lake dwellings of Switzerland and northern Italy. Still other sources attribute the introduction of hemp into Italy to the arrivals of both the Scythians and the Illyrians between the 10th and the 8th centuries B.C. while, by the 6th and 5th centuries B.C., hemp cultivation was present throughout Italy.

=== Earliest evidence ===
In any case, the oldest evidence of the presence of cannabis and humulus in central Italy dates back to the Late Glacial, long before the development of agriculture in western Eurasia, as inferred from sediment cores extracted from the Albano and Nemi lakes. The presence of cannabis pollen grains in sediments dated to the early Holocene suggests that the plant could have been introduced earlier, or that an indigenous hemp population may have already been present in the area before its domestication during the Bronze Age. Other prehistoric sites where sediment cores revealed the presence of hemp include the Great Lake of Monticchio, in Basilicata; and the coastal seabed of the Central Adriatic region, from a time when these sites would have been above sea level. Traces of hemp pollen have also been found in several Neolithic sites in anthropogenic contexts, which would indicate the probable cultivation of the plant during that period. These include three Middle Neolithic (i.e., 4500–4000 B.C.) sites in the areas of Piacenza, Parma, and Forlì in Emilia-Romagna; as well as other sites near the Annone and Alserio lakes in Lombardy, from 5000 B.C. onwards. Furthermore, while the sites where hemp pollen has been found are currently scarce for the Bronze Age, they increase in number for the Iron Age, especially during the centuries of Roman domination.

In regard to the sediment cores from central Italy, humulus pollen values increase during the mid Holocene, while hemp pollen grains become more frequent at the transition between the Neolithic and the Copper Age, with concentrations increasing and becoming more common only from the Bronze Age onwards. In addition, the sediment records show an increase in the human influence on the local vegetation, with hemp pollen values starting to rise from about 3000 cal BP (i.e., 1050 B.C.) onwards, and reaching their earliest peak during the 1st century A.D., as a clear consequence of the cultivation of hemp by the Romans, although the pre-Roman trends can be attributed to natural sources, and possibly to anthropogenic sources as well. Later peaks in the pollen records from central Italy also show clear evidence of hemp cultivation during the Medieval period.

In terms of the earliest evidence of the processing of hemp for the production of strings and fabrics in Italy, three micro-fragments of what appear to be hemp fibers were detected through a scanning electron microscope in the dental calculi of three female individuals from the Early Bronze Age. Furthermore, the analysis of the teeth of 28 females and one male from the same period, revealed evidence of activity-induced dental modifications that are consistent with yarn production, or weaving preparation, of small-diameter threads, which were repeatedly pulled across the fronts and sides of the individuals' upper incisors and canines. All the examined individuals were buried in an ancient cemetery located in Gricignano di Aversa, in southern Italy, and traces of hemp were also found attached to a metal blade, possibly the remains of a fabric sheath, in the tomb of an adult male within the same site. These findings show the importance that hemp fabrics had in the region at the time, as well as clear gender-based role divisions in the manufacturing of fibers.

== Magna Graecia ==
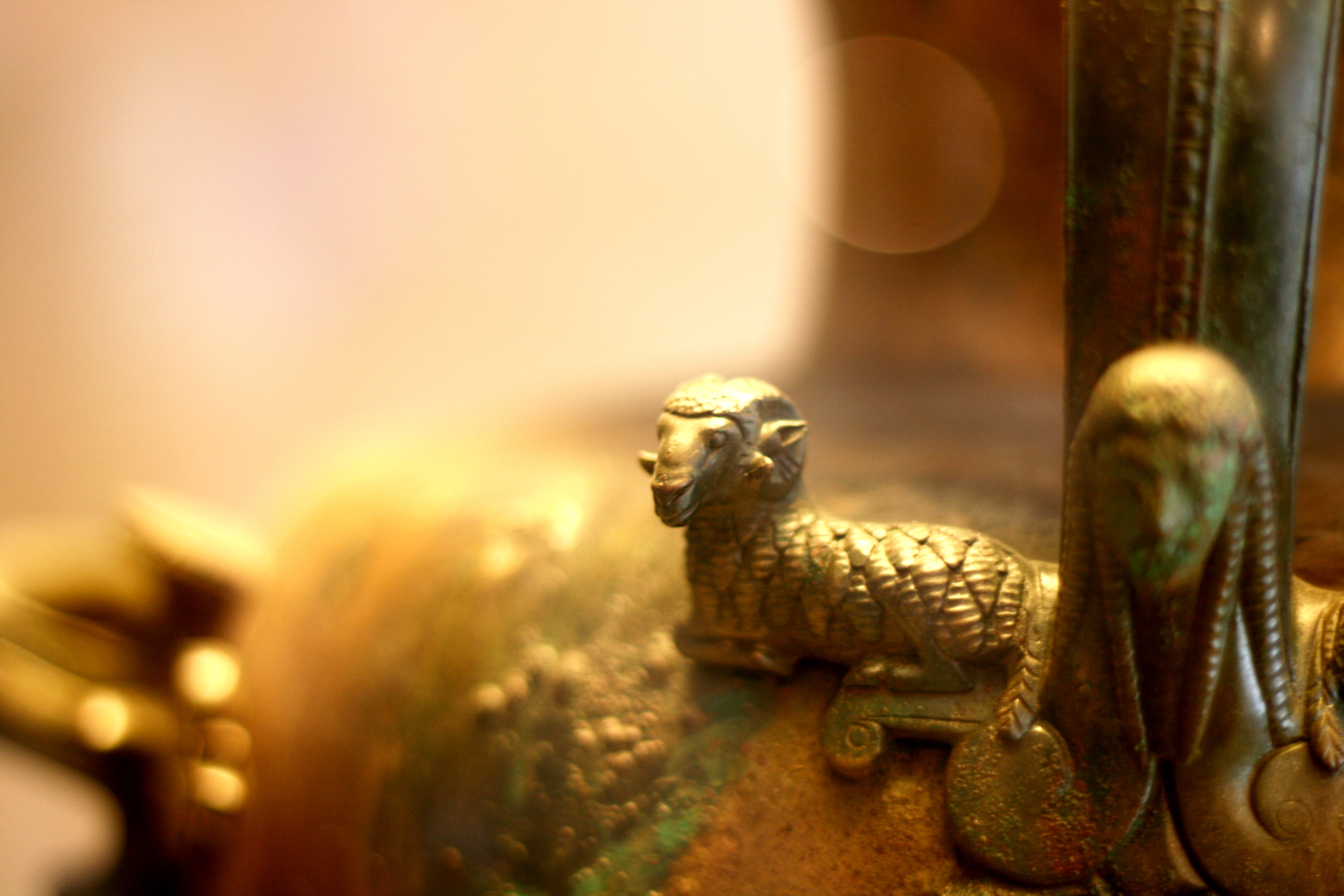
Detail of one of the bronze hydriai from the heroon of Poseidonia, dated to 520 B.C., on display at the National Archaeological Museum of Paestum.

In 1954, a now-famous hypogaeum was excavated by Italian archaeologist Pellegrino Claudio Sestieri in the Ancient Greek colony of Poseidonia, Magna Graecia, in the area of modern-day Capaccio Paestum. Dated to the late 6th century B.C., the underground structure was identified as a heroon possibly dedicated to the unknown founder of the city, based on the retrieved artifacts, which included eight bronze vases (i.e., six hydriai and two amphoras). Other proposed interpretations of the structure included a Nymph sanctuary, the cenotaph of the founder of Sybaris, or a Chthonian sanctuary; however, as very little written records are available from the considered period, the organic content of the vases constitutes the primary source of knowledge regarding the purpose of the sacellum.

In 2023, a scientific research paper was published regarding the detection of a significant quantity of cannabis pollen inside some of the hydriai, as well as of oil traces that were compatible with hemp oil. As the analyzed organic content of the vases was not consistent with the main Mediterranean ritual organic matters (e.g. honey, olive oil, and wine), it could not be attributed to a possible local heroic cult; while the fact that the pollen mainly came from male cannabis plants ruled out the use of said plants for intoxicating purposes.

Instead, the presence of cannabis could be attributed to environmental contamination, whether during the processing of the content (if the oil traces are indeed from hemp), the deposition of the vases and the sealing of the room, or possibly more recently during the excavation, storage, and handling of the archaeological find. Although the oil processing hypothesis is unlikely due to the fact that hemp oil would have been produced from the seeds of female plants, airborne pollen contamination from a local cultivation area before the room was closed is possible, with male hemp plants usually flowering earlier than female ones. Other potential causes also include a contemporary symbolic use of hemp plants, and the possible use of hemp textiles to decorate the room, since male plants were the preferred source of fiber.

== Ancient Carthage ==
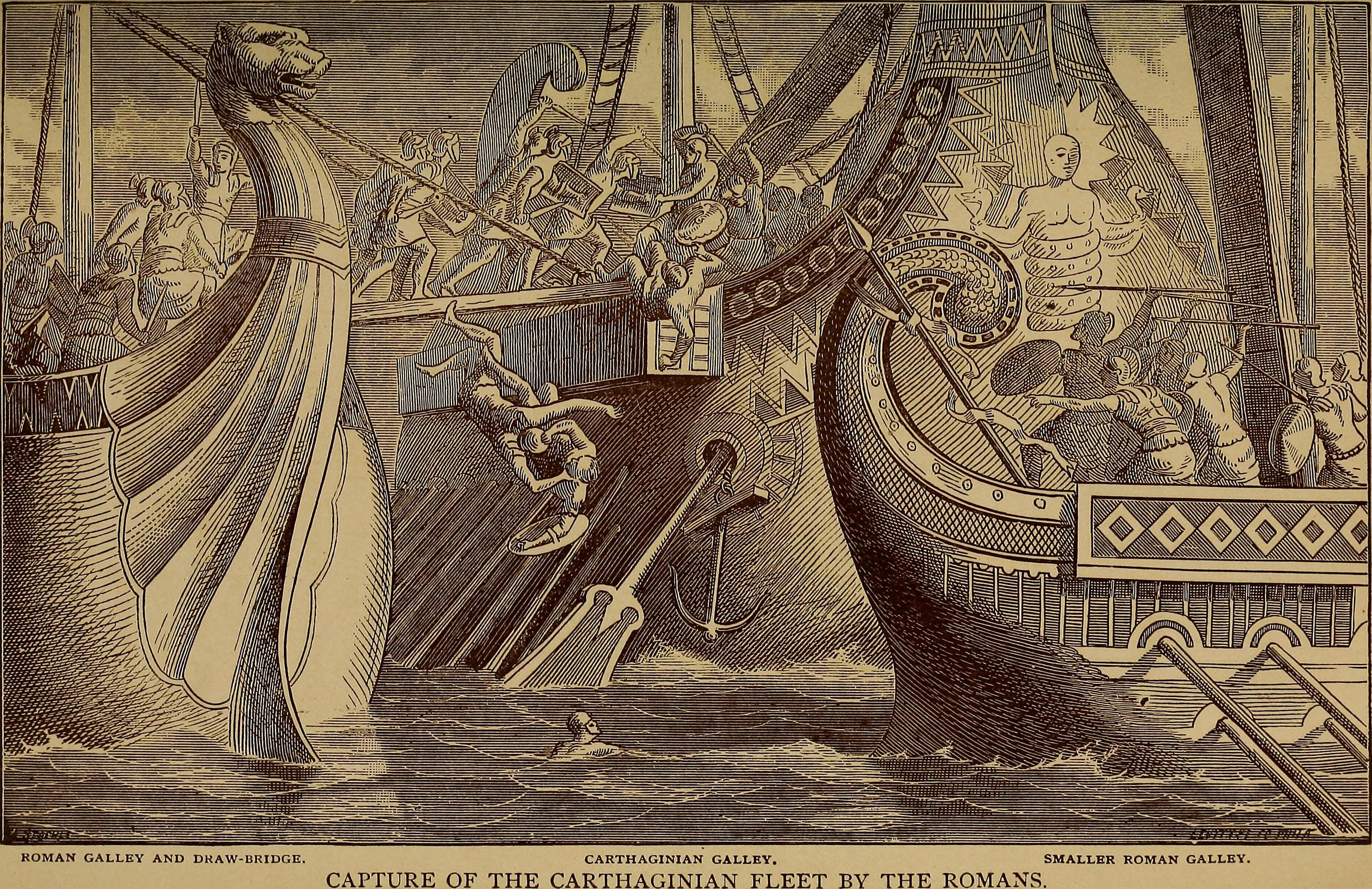
Illustration from 1883 depicting the capture of a Carthaginian galley by the Romans, who used a corvus for boarding, during the First Punic War.

In 1969, the remains of two Punic ships from the 3rd century B.C. were discovered off the shore of Isola Lunga, not far from Lilybaion, on the western coast of Carthaginian Sicily. The two ships are believed to have been sunk during the First Punic War of 264–241 B.C., specifically at the Battle of the Aegates of 10 March 241 B.C., which was fought between the Carthaginian and Roman fleets. In 1971, a team led by the Cypriot-English pioneer of underwater archaeology Honor Frost uncovered from the site a few baskets that contained distinctive yellowish stems, no more than 3 cm (1.18 in) in length, which were later identified as similar to cannabis sativa.

As the stems were always found in association with food, in the presumed area of the ship's kitchen, it was postulated that cannabis could have been consumed by the Punic oarsmen possibly for its supposed mind-focusing abilities. Such postulation was based on a 1972 study on the use of the drug by Jamaican workmen, which states that almost without exception users maintain that ganja enhances their ability to perform manual labour, and they regularly consume ganja with this objective; however, Dr. Frost recognized that whether the Carthaginians would make an infusion potent enough to give fighting men "Dutch courage" is less certain.

== Ancient Rome ==
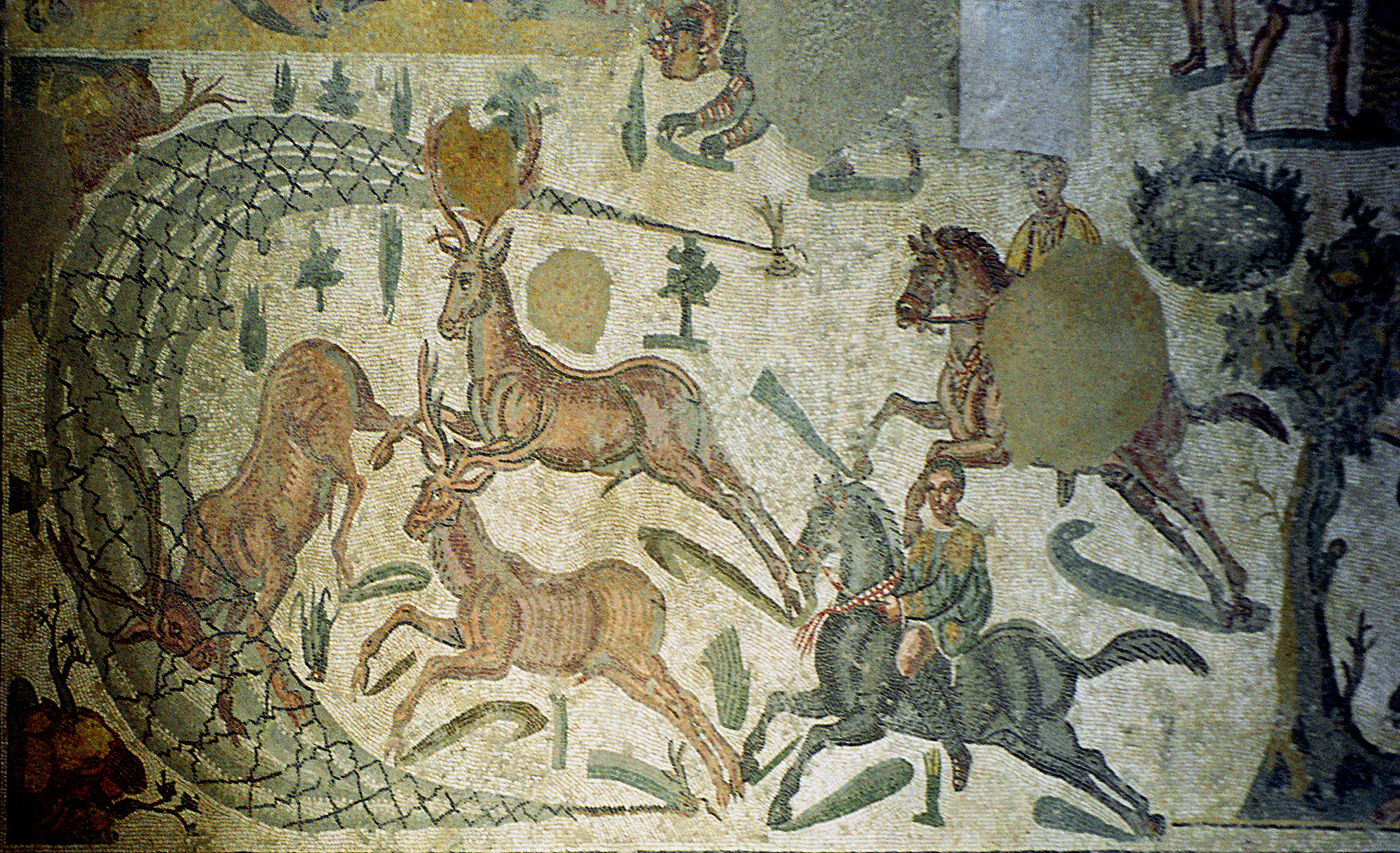
Detail of the Little hunt mosaic, on the floor of the Villa Romana del Casale, depicting the use of a hunting net to capture three stags.

Tun' mare transilias? Tibi torta cannabe fulto coena sit in transtro?
Note. Apostrophe from the Satura V by Persius, directed at Lucius Annaeus Cornutus, attesting the use of hemp ropes in Roman ships, meaning Would you bound over the sea? Would you have your dinner on a thwart, seated on a coil of hemp?.

One of the earliest authors from the Roman Republic to mention industrial hemp was satirist Gaius Lucilius, in the 2nd century B.C., who referenced thomices, an ancient greek word used to indicate lightly twisted ropes obtained from rough hemp and broom, out of which cords were made. The plant was later mentioned by Marcus Terentius Varro in his De re rustica, a work on agriculture written in 37 B.C., where hemp is listed together with other plants used for their fibers, namely flax, reeds, palm, and bulrushes. In the 1st century A.D., Roman naturalist Pliny the Elder described in his Naturalis Historia the cultivation and use of cannabis plants in the Roman Empire, both for industrial and medical purposes, while hemp is also mentioned in the satires of Persius and Juvenal. As the Roman territories expanded, the cultivation and use of cannabis plants spread to various parts of both Italy and the wider European continent. As an example, several pieces of rope tentatively identified as made of hemp were found within the well of a Roman fort in Dunbartonshire, Caledonia, which was occupied during the period 140–180 A.D., and the find attests to the likelihood that the earliest introduction of hemp in Britain came by Roman agency.

The hemp fiber was mainly used by the Romans to produce ropes, sheets, wickers, and nets; in particular Pliny mentions three Alabandica varieties to be the best ones to be used for hunting nets, the variety cultivated in Mylasa to be the second best, and the hemp grown in the Sabine territory to be particularly tall. In regard to woven fabrics, archaeological excavations at Pompeii, in Campania felix (i.e., part of what is now Campania), unearthed samples of hemp textiles that had been preserved by the eruption of Mount Vesuvius in 79 A.D., reportedly including cloth sandals made of hemp, although linen was generally preferred in Antiquity for the production of canvas, sails, and clothing. In 1992, further textile samples were recovered from a lead sarcophagus that belonged to an upper-class elderly woman, who lived between the 4th and 5th centuries A.D., and was buried in a Roman necropolis located in Albintimilium, in the coastal area of Liguria that now constitutes the Region of the same name. Based on morphological and morphometrical analyses, the recovered fibers were later identified as most likely being fragments of cannabis sativa, although a slight chance was recognized that they could actually belong to low quality linen.

In terms of the extension of hemp cultivation in Italia, precise information is not available besides a few unverified archaeological data and the hemp variety mentioned by Pliny, which was grown in the area of Reate, in Sabinum. Nevertheless, two important epigraphic sources attest to the cultivation and trade of hemp by the Romans in the peninsula, namely a sepulchral inscription uncovered in Bovolenta and dated between the 2nd and 3rd centuries A.D., that mentions the cannabetum (i.e., an area reserved to hemp cultivation); and a lead tag uncovered in the area around Altinum, in Venetia, and dated between the 1st century B.C. and the 1st century A.D., that labelled a cargo of six balls of wool and a small quantity of hemp.

=== Cannabis cultivation and processing ===
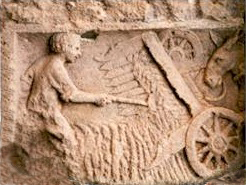
Relief depicting a Gallo-Roman farmer harvesting crops.

According to Pliny, Roman farmers would sow hemp seeds during spring and harvest the ripe hemp seeds after the autumn equinox, after which they were dried in the sun, or the wind, or by the smoke of a fire, while the hemp plants were plucked after the vintage, to be then peeled and cleaned. Moreover, according to the De re rustica by contemporary agricultural writer Columella, hemp plants require either rich, manured, and well-watered soil, or alternatively soil that is level, moist, and deeply worked. Ancient Romans would plant six hemp seeds per pes quadratus (0.0876 m^{2}; 0.943 sq ft) toward the end of February however, if the weather was rainy, sowing could be done up to the spring equinox without harming the crop. One of the last Roman authors to mention hemp was Palladius in his Opus agriculturae, a treatise written around the late 4th – early 5th century A.D., which essentially repeats what was reported by Columella on cannabis cultivation. In terms of articles of commerce, useful information on the price of both hemp and hemp-derived products can be found in the Edict on Maximum Prices, issued in 301 A.D. by Emperor Diocletian, which established price caps equal to 80 denarii per modius (8.73 L; 1.92 imp gal) of hemp seeds, and 4 denarii per libra (372.5 g; 131.4 oz) of processed hemp, while it increased to 6 and 8 denarii for ropes and strings, respectively. These maximum prices were relatively modest when compared to more expensive products, such as flax seeds, linen, and wool, which attests to the lower demand for hemp products at the time.

In 2018, excavations on the eastern bank of the ancient Natiso cum Turro river of Aquileia, in the area of Venetia et Histria that is now Friuli-Venezia Giulia, revealed the first system of basins from the Roman world that is known to have been used for the maceration of hemp, as inferred from archaeobotanical and archaeo-palynological studies of the site. The long and shallow pools were dated between the late 2nd – 3rd A.D. and the late 3rd – early 4th century A.D.; they were delimited by parapets made of clay, sand, and tiny pebbles; and they were coated with thin layers of cocciopesto for waterproofing. Similarly to more recent water retting procedures, the harvested stalks of cannabis sativa were bundled into sheaves and then submerged into either stagnant or running water by tying them to dedicated poles, to extract the fiber. According to studies carried out in Venetia, hemp cultivation in the Upper Adriatic region was not intensive, rather it was either the result of self-sufficiency policies or, if it occurred on a larger scale, a complementary sector to the local wool industry, which was well developed in Aquileia at the time. In addition, sulphurous waters from hot springs, such as those that can be found in the area around Aquileia, found usage in Antiquity in the maceration of both hemp and flax, which were then used in the production of cordage and fishing nets, in the manufacture of wool blend fabrics, as well as in the processing of both wool and wool products.

=== Cannabis consumption ===
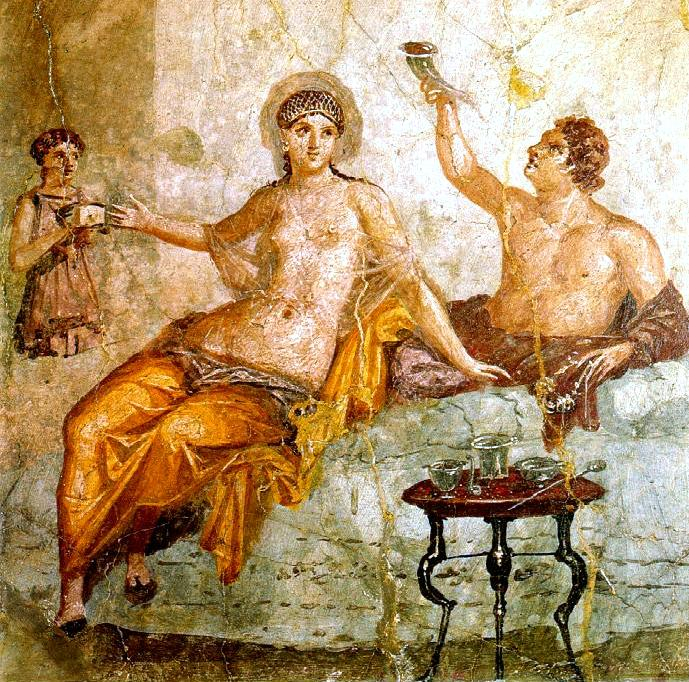
Wall painting depicting an idealized Greek drinking party in the 1st century A.D., inside a domus in Herculaneum.

In Italia, different parts of the hemp plants were used for various culinary purposes, in particular Pliny mentions hemp seeds being stored in pots for later use and lasting for as much as one year, while the stalks and branches were used as vegetables. Most notably, a recipe for cannabis-based food intended to be consumed at wedding receptions can be found in the De re culinaria, a collection of Roman cookery recipes thought to have been compiled in the 5th century A.D., and whose authorship is unclear. In terms of the contemporary beliefs on cannabis plants and the effects of their personal use, according to Pliny, wild hemp first grew in woods and had darker and rougher leaves, while its seeds were said to cause impotence. The juice derived from it was used to drive out worms and other creatures that could enter the ears, although it would cause headache as a side effect, and it was said to be so potent that it was able to coagulate water when it was poured into it. Furthermore, when the hemp juice was mixed with water and then drunk by beasts of burden, it was said to be able to regulate their bowels.

In regard to medical properties, hemp roots boiled in water were thought to ease cramped joints, gout, and similar violent pains, while they could also be applied raw to burns, but they would be changed before getting dry. The ability of boiled cannabis roots to lessen inflammation was also attested by contemporary Greek physician and botanist Pedanius Dioscorides in his De Materia Medica, a pharmacopoeia that mainly focuses on medicinal plants. In regard to the recreational use of cannabis in the Roman Empire, 2nd century Greek physician and philosopher Claudius Galenus wrote that it was customary in Italia to serve small cannabis-based cakes for dessert, whose seeds would reportedly create a feeling of warmth and increase thirst. Moreover, if consumed in large quantities, these small cakes would affect the head by emitting a warm and toxic vapor, which produced torpor or sluggishness; while it was also customary for the Romans to offer guests hemp seeds as a promoter of hilarity. Similarly, it has been hypothesized that Pliny probably referenced cannabis when mentioning gelotophyllis (i.e., the leaves of laughter), which he said grew along the Borysthenes river, in Scythia, as well as in Bactria, an ancient country located in the northeastern part of modern-day Afghanistan, or at least in the general area of central Asia. According to Pliny, if these leaves were taken in myrrh and wine, all kinds of phantoms would beset the mind, causing a laughter that persisted until the kernels of pine nuts were taken with pepper and honey in palm wine.

In 2019, a scientific study was published which aimed at reconstructing the lifestyle of a Roman Imperial community, that lived between the 1st and 3rd centuries A.D. near the ancient town of Cures, in Sabinum. As part of the ethnobotanical evidence, 11 micro-residues of Cannabaceae plant tissue were recovered from the dental calculi of 27 individuals buried in a Roman necropolis, which was discovered in 2015 near Passo Corese, in Lazio. The studied fragments, most likely hemp fibers, were identified through observations made under optical microscope, which were then cross-referenced with the available laboratory collections of fibers, literature data, as well as the particular cultural and chronological context. The proposed reasons for the presence of hemp fibers in the analyzed dental calculi include their possible inhalation during hemp processing activities; the ingestion of food and beverages whose ingredients had been preserved in hemp sacks; and the intake of hemp exudates and extracts for therapeutic purposes.

== Middle Ages ==
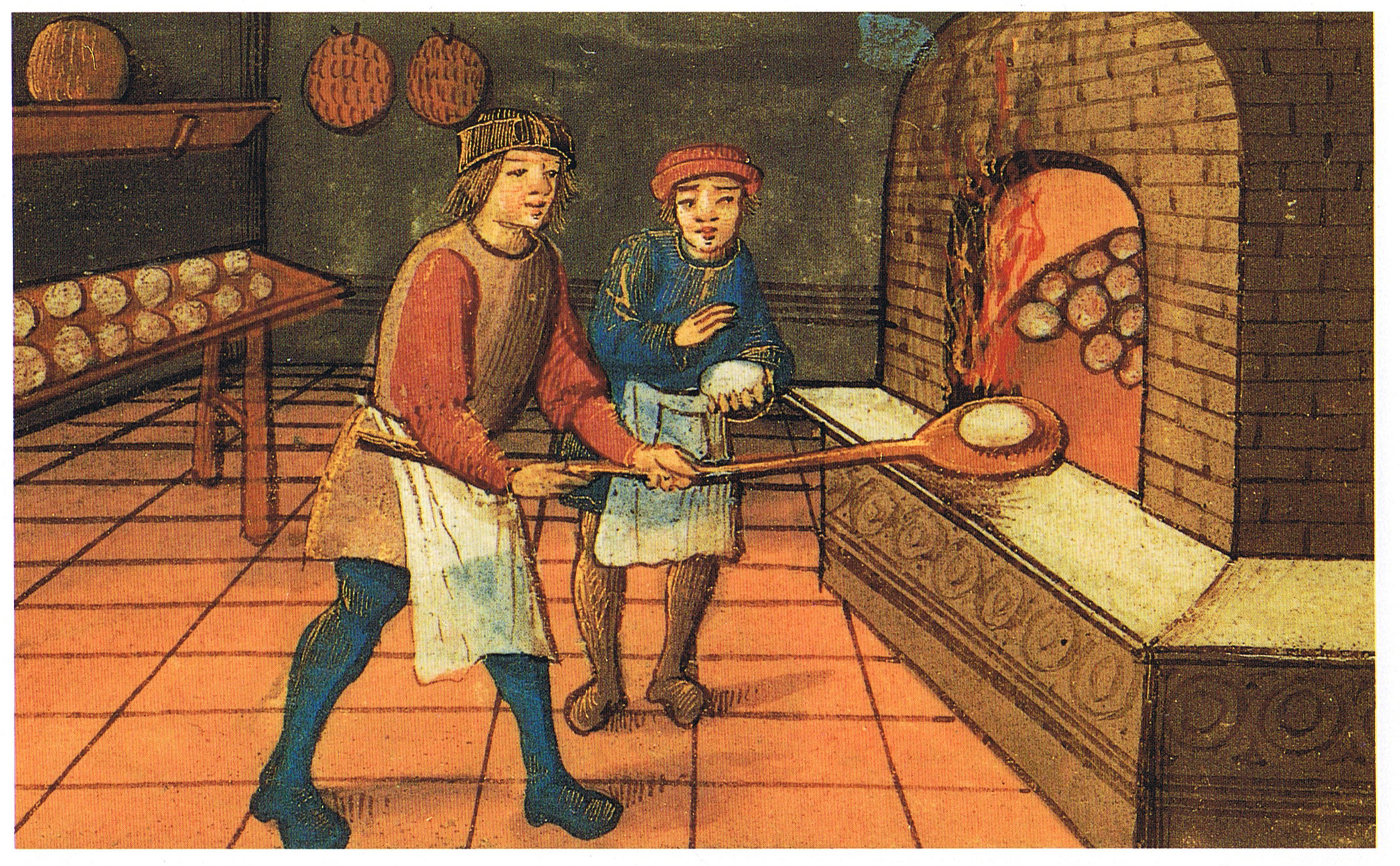
Miniature depicting a medieval baker with his apprentice.

Canapa, lino, e lenta, prima semenza.
Note. Umbrian proverb from Valnerina on the importance of hemp, meaning Hemp, flax, and lentil, first among seeds.

After the fall of the Western Roman Empire in 476 A.D., and the concurrent migration period lasting between the 4th and 6th centuries A.D., detailed information on the cultivation of hemp in Italy before 1000 A.D. is scarce, even though its processing for industrial and commercial purposes is well attested during that period. Nevertheless, cannabis cultivation across the Italian peninsula must have been severely limited, particularly between the 4th and 8th centuries A.D., considering that as much as two-thirds of the countryside was reportedly left in a state of almost complete abandon.

The mass cultivation of industrial cannabis in Medieval Italy started during the High Middle Ages, with the demographic and agricultural recoveries, the emergence of the textile industry, the rise of Medieval communes and the Maritime Republics, and the increase of their trade in the Mediterranean Sea. For instance, while linen was the main material used in sail production throughout Antiquity, to be then replaced by fustians (i.e., a mixed fiber of cotton and wool) during the Early Middle Ages, the greater resistance of hemp made it better suited for the new sailing structures required for the ships of ever-increasing tonnage that were being built between the 13th and 14th centuries. In fact, since the Middle Ages, hemp became the only fiber used in rope manufacturing and later, since the 16th century, a fundamental material for the construction of sails; and the substantial increase in the demand from arsenals drove up the price of hemp and incentivized its cultivation. The large quantities of hemp needed for the shipbuilding industry also led to the emergence of dedicated supply chains, with groups of merchants providing investments and organizing the transport of the fiber; as well as of specialized productions, with the hemp produced for arsenals acquiring specific characteristics when compared to the hemp intended for the general population.

Between 1304 and 1309, Bolognese jurist and landowner Pietro de' Crescenzi compiled an agricultural treatise entitled De agricultura vulgare, alternatively known as the Ruralia commoda, which includes a section on the cultivation of industrial cannabis at the time. In the treatise, hemp is described as having the same nature as flax, namely requiring similar air and soil, although the latter does not need to be ploughed as much. Nevertheless, for the production of ropes, the seeds must be planted in rich soil, to increase the resulting yield, while the sparser the seeds are planted, the more ramified the grown plants will be. Conversely, for the production of textiles such as cloth sacks, sheets, or shirts, the soil does not need to be as rich, while the seeds must be more densely sowed, to obtain plants without branches, which are more suitable for such products. Moreover, hemp fiber is described as necessary for the production of fishing nets, since it is more water resistant than flax fiber.

Furthermore, hemp seeds have been used for food for several centuries, especially by the poorer social classes, since they were inexpensive, rich in nutrients, and available even during droughts. In fact, several centuries-old Italian recipes use cannabis sativa as the main ingredient, and these recipes include:

- the Tortelli con fiori di canapaccia, described in a recipe from the 13th century;
- the Minestra di canapuccia, which is described as good for the invalids in the Registrum coquine, written around 1430 by Johannes de Bockenheim, who was a German clergyman and cook in the service of Pope Martin V;
- the Suppa fatta di semente di canepa, described by the 15th century culinary expert Maestro Martino;
- the Piatto di canapa and the Focaccia di canapa, both described in the De honesta voluptate et valetudine, written around 1465 by gastronomist Bartolomeo Sacchi.

In the Ricettario Fiorentino, considered the first official pharmacopoeia in Europe, cannabis is listed as sedenegi cioè seme di chanapa (i.e., sedenegi, that is, seed of hemp). The term sedenegi is a latinised version through Arabic of Persian from šāh (i.e., king) and dānah (i.e., seed/grain or knowledge), šahdānaŷ (i.e., King of Seeds) designated hempseeds and, metonymically, the Cannabis plant as a whole. The term was often used in medieval texts.

=== Tales of the Hashishins ===
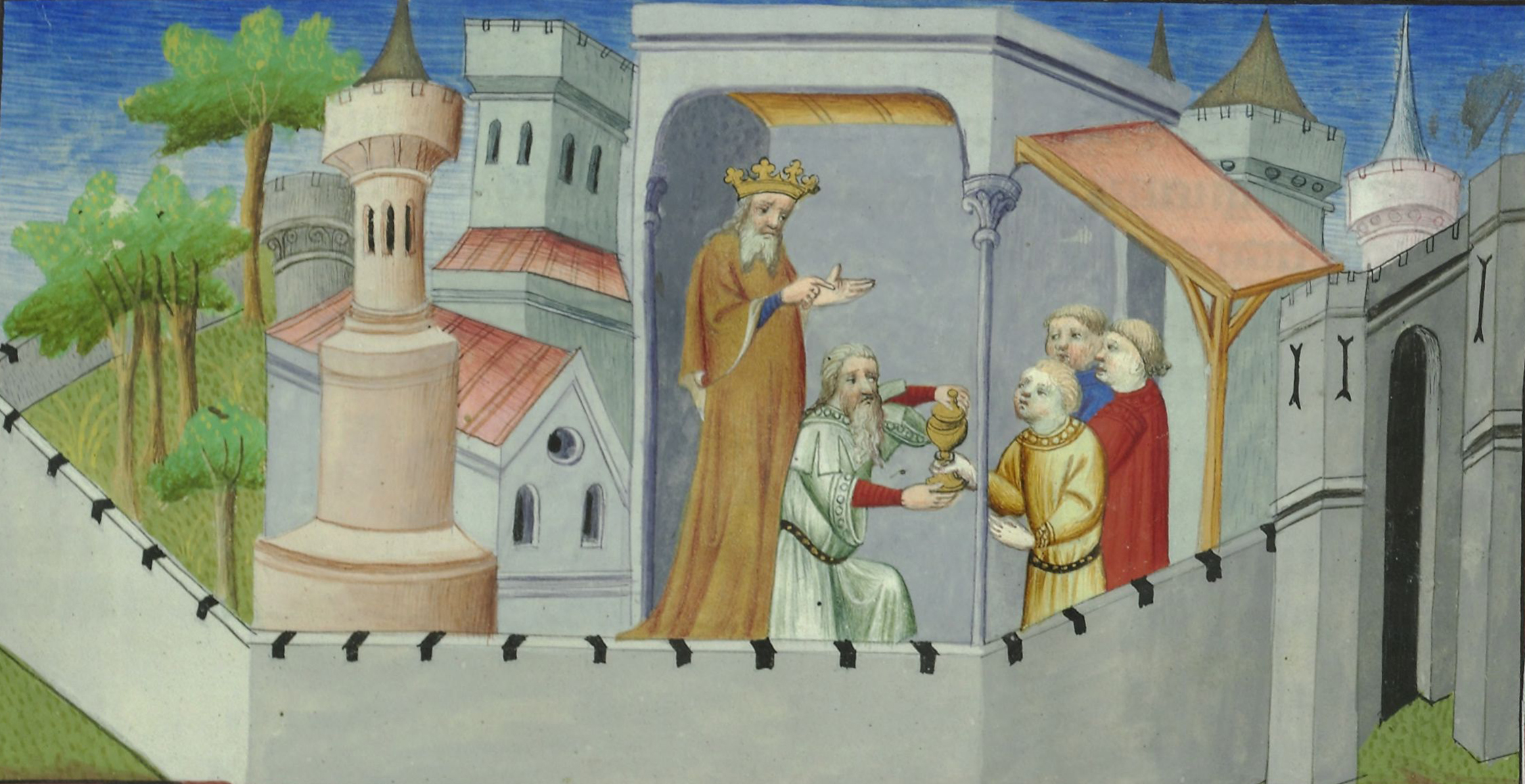
Miniature depicting the 26th Nizari Ismaili Imam Alâ al Dîn Muhammad of Alamut while drugging his disciples.

So he selected from among his drugs a powder of marvellous virtue, which he had gotten in the Levant from a great prince, who averred that 'twas wont to be used by the Old Man of the Mountain, when he would send any one to or bring him from his paradise, and that, without doing the recipient any harm, 'twould induce in him, according to the quantity of the dose, a sleep of such duration and quality that, while the efficacy of the powder lasted, none would deem him to be alive.
Note. Excerpt translated from the Decamerone by Boccaccio, which references the use of hashish among the Assassins.

One of the earliest mentions of the use of hashish in the Italian literature can be found in Il Milione, an account of Venetian merchant and explorer Marco Polo's travels through Asia between 1271 and 1295, that was written down by Pisan romance writer Rusticiano, with whom Marco Polo shared his prison cell in the Republic of Genoa, after his capture during the War of Curzola of 1295–1299. In the travelogue, the two authors talk about the Old Man of the Mountain, in reference to Persian leader Hasan-i Sabbah, who founded the Nizari Ismaili state in 1090 after taking control of the mountain fortress of Alamut; and the Order of Assassins, of which Hasan-i Sabbah was the first Grand Master, and whose very name derives from the word hashshāshīn (i.e., hashish users). Both the drug and the Old Man were later referenced in the Decamerone, a collection of short stories written by Florentine poet and Renaissance humanist Giovanni Boccaccio in 1353.

== Republic of Venice ==
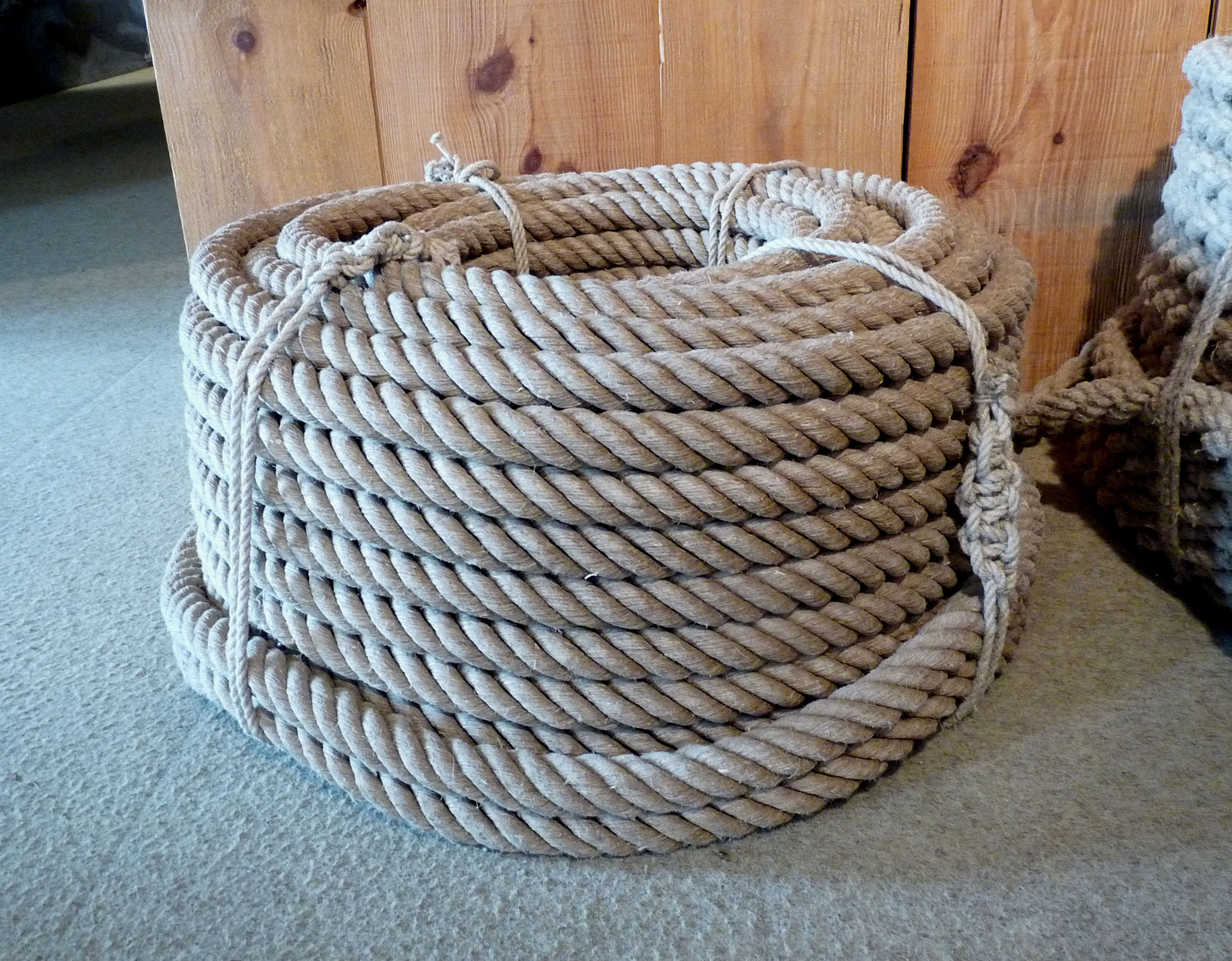
A 150 m (492.1 ft) long and 4 cm (1.57 in) thick hemp rope, at the Corderie Royale in Rochefort, France.

Se la luna xe in colore, el canego more.
Note. Venetian proverb from the popular tradition, meaning If the Moon is in color, the hemp dies.

The cultivation of industrial cannabis in Veneto dates back to at least the 13th century, as attested in an official document from the civil authorities of Montagnana, which in 1290 prohibited the drying of the processed hemp in public places, to protect passers-by from its foul odor. Conversely, the mass production of naval ropes, cables, and hawsers from hemp at the Venetian Arsenal commenced between 1303 and 1322, when the first corderia was established, known as the Tana hemp house. The used raw hemp was mainly imported through trade agreements from the Don river delta, on the Azov Sea, where the Venetians established several trading posts, whose importance is attested by the fact that the Tana hemp house most likely derived its name from Tanais, the ancient greek name for both the Don river and the Greek colony on its delta. Nevertheless, to maintain favorable prices and ensure steady supplies, especially after losing their trading posts on the Black Sea to the Republic of Genoa, Venice further imported hemp mainly from Emilia, and to a lesser extent Marche, Piedmont, and the Middle East, while also incentivizing its own domestic production.

In the Republic of Venice, industrial cannabis was a state monopoly whose price was fixed for public uses, while both its hoarding and exportation were prohibited, and its maceration and storage were strictly regulated. The strategic importance of the raw material for shipbuilding is also attested by its exemption from tariffs, as well as by several deliberations and provisions from both the Venetian Judiciary and Senate, that were aimed at the protection and promotion of hemp cultivation in the mainland. In particular, after its expansion into the Venetian hinterland at the beginning of the 15th century, the Republic started investing in the territory of Montagnana already in 1412, with the establishment of a warehouse where the locally produced hemp would be stored, prior to its transportation to Venice. Moreover, the patricians Nicolò Tron and Giovanni Moro were sent in 1455 to the districts of Montagnana and Cologna Veneta, to oversee the necessary hydraulic projects for the construction of several hemp maceration sites. As a result, public water retting sites were established in Montagnana, Este, and Cologna Veneta, while appointed magistrates were charged with monitoring the implementation of the relevant laws.

After the establishment of hemp fields in the area around Padua during the second half of the 15th century, Venice became independent from other countries for its strategic supplies. From the beginning, the agricultural policy project that allowed for this outcome was a joint venture between the public and private sectors, which gave rise to a hybrid organization by which the State determined cultivation procedures, quantities, and price, while the private land owners provided the fields and manpower. As a result of the widespread control exercised by the State, the hemp production in the Domini di Terraferma eventually became an extension of the organizational structure of the Arsenal. In order to further protect its domestic production, the Venetian Republic ended up imposing heavy import duties on hemp fiber in the second half of the 16th century, and eventually banned its importation altogether. Even though such measures received significant criticism due to their various repercussions on both trade and industries, they also resulted in the development of hemp cultivations in the territories of Polesine, Vicenza, Belluno, and Treviso. In fact, while Venice was never able to completely remove the need for hemp supplies from Bologna, the project did give hemp cultivation a stable role in the Veneto agriculture from the 18th century onwards, with the creation of an agro-industrial chain.

=== Hemp and warfare ===
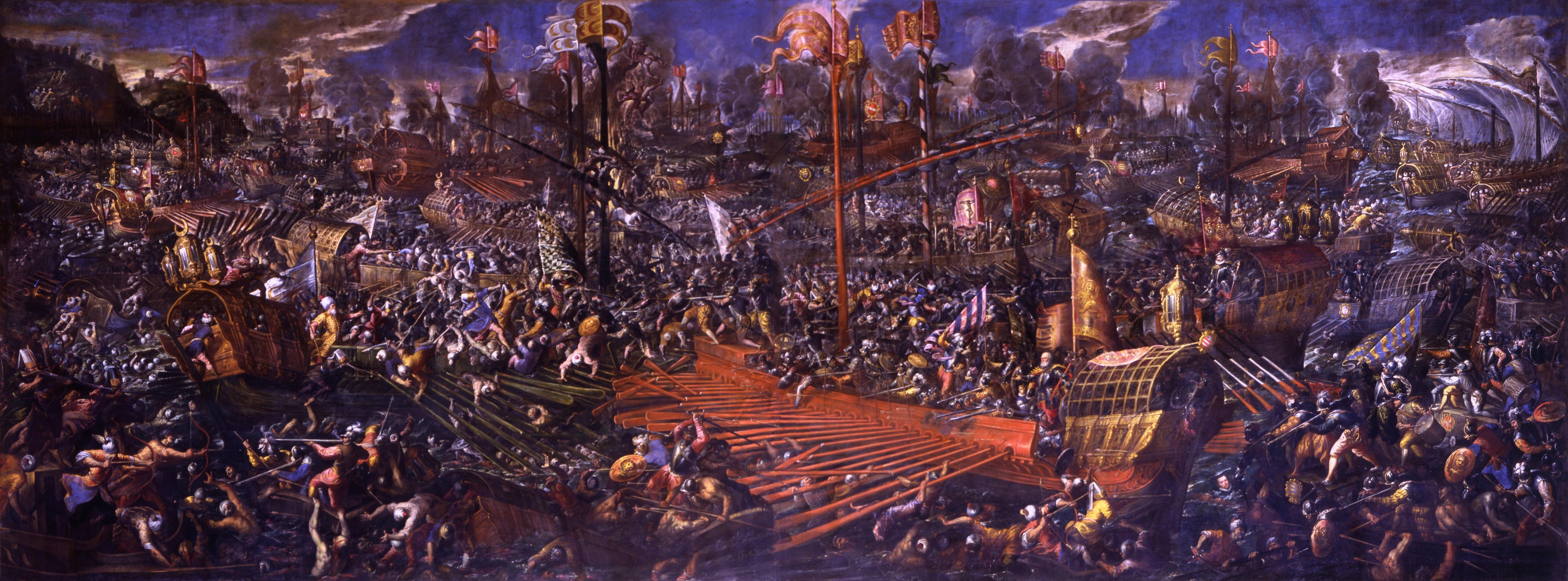
Painting from 1603 depicting the Battle of Lepanto of 7 October 1571, by Andrea Vicentino, exhibited at the Doge's Palace in Venice. Standing on the quarterdecks of their respective flagships, the Admirals Sebastiano Venier, Don Juan of Austria, and Marcantonio Colonna (right) are depicted opposite to Grand Admiral Müezzinzade Ali Pasha (left).

The manufacture of cordage in our house of the Tana [...] is the security of our galleys and ships and similarly of our sailors and capital.
Note. Declaration attributed to the Venetian Senate, on the strategic importance of hemp ropes for the naval strength of the Republic.

In the context of the heavy losses suffered by the Venetian Navy at the Battle of Curzola on 9 September 1298, the Major Council approved the construction of the Tana hemp house on 7 July 1302, as part of the first enlargement of the Arsenal, to localize the storage of hemp and the production of ropes. Located on the southern side of the Arsenal, the elongated ropewalks were later reconstructed between 1579 and 1585 under architect Antonio da Ponte, resulting in a 317 m (1,040 ft) long and 21 m (68.9 ft) wide building divided into three aisles by two rows of 6 m (19.7 ft) tall and 1 m (3.3 ft) wide brick columns, for a total of 84 pillars.

The hemp was primarily used to manufacture cordage and sails for the Venetian fleet at low costs, but it was also used for caulking ship hulls. The ropes could also be sold at a lower price to foreign ships transiting at the port, thus making it competitive in the international market at the time, although sales from the Arsenal to private third parties required a specific licence issued by the authorities. After the victory of the Holy League against the Ottoman Empire at the Battle of Lepanto on 7 October 1571, the Venetian Senate charged the Arsenal with the upkeep of 100 thin galleys and 12 galleasses for the purpose of rapid deployment. Nevertheless, the heavy crisis of the late 16th century dealt a significant blow to the Venetian shipbuilding industry, leaving the Arsenal with a halved reserve of galleys in 1633. According to contemporary estimates, an 800-botti ship in 1586 required around 24 t (23.6 long tons) of hemp to supply its shrouds and cordage; while the hemp used for sails, ropes, and shrouds, represented 30% of the total cost of a galley in 1600.

In addition to the state-controlled production aimed at the needs of the Navy, private enterprises were also established for the manufacture of hemp yarns, ropes, and textiles, which became the subject of significant trade over time. As an example, the Morosini family oversaw a large trade network by the end of the 15th century, through which the patricians exported significant quantities of textiles, including hemp fabrics, all over the Mediterranean and the Near East. In particular, from the emporium that the Morosini established in Aleppo, such products could reach the markets of Damascus, Beirut, Famagosta, and Nicosia, among others.

=== Traditional hemp rope production ===
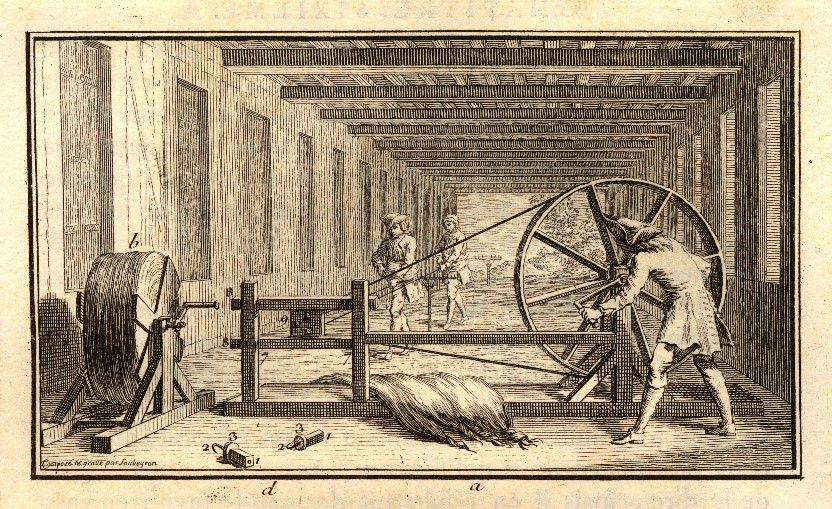
Engraving depicting the spinning process in the 17th century.

At the hemp house, the hemp fiber would arrive in large square bales, already macerated and dry, and it would be forcefully slammed against a wooden pole, equipped with metal rods, to complete the breakage of the stalk. The remaining woody fragments would then be removed using comb-like tools of different shapes for both coarser and finer combing, in preparation for the spinning phase. While using scutching tools with ever-finer teeth, the finest of which could have a teeth spacing as small as 1 mm (0.04 in), the artisans would gradually separate the different fibers based on their qualities, including their robustness and color. The spinning mechanism consisted in a large rotating wooden wheel, placed vertically and firmly fixed to the ground, equipped with laterally protruding rods that supported a winding rope connecting the wheel to several interchangeable wooden cylinders of different dimensions, depending on the final size of the rope to be produced, which were located a few meters away. The rotating wheel would make such cylinders spin, and they could be used to either twist a twine (with a single cylinder), or intertwine three or four strings (with multiple cylinders) to produce different types of rope.

Several other tools were used to keep the rope always tightly stretched, while also sustaining its weight along the ropewalk; to avoid hand contact with the rope during twisting; and to keep it constantly lubricated, thus preventing any damage from friction-related heat. Afterwards, the rope was soaked overnight, since the water would cause the twisted fibers to stick together, which would therefore increase the compactness of the rope. As a final touch, an iron mesh would subsequently be used to rub the rope, to remove the last few remaining streaks, while a stretch of coarse rope would be rolled up and run around the rope for a final smoothing and polishing. The produced ropes would then be safely stored, thus creating strategic stockpiles that would allow the Republic to remain independent from external suppliers during wartime. These stockpiles were overseen by three magistrates, known as the Visdomini alla Tana, who were elected by the Major Council, and one of the required checks was that the ropes produced for vessels had to be made from exactly 1,098 twisted hemp strings. When needed, the rope would be taken out of storage through dedicated holes, and cut at the required size, rather than already being produced at standardized lengths, while the fiber of any leftover would be repurposed.

After the fall of the Republic of Venice in 1797, with the arrival of Napoleon, the Tana hemp house ended its centuries-old activity, to be then turned into a warehouse, while it has more recently been used as an exhibition center during the Venice Biennale since 1980. The production of ropes was instead moved to the Corte dei Cordami (i.e., Cordage Courtyard) on the island of Giudecca, where hawsers were still being twisted in open-air ropewalks, and activities continued there up until 1995. The legacy of the once-thriving hemp rope industry, as well as many other related activities, is attested in the toponyms of several streets in Venice.

== Kingdom of the Two Sicilies ==
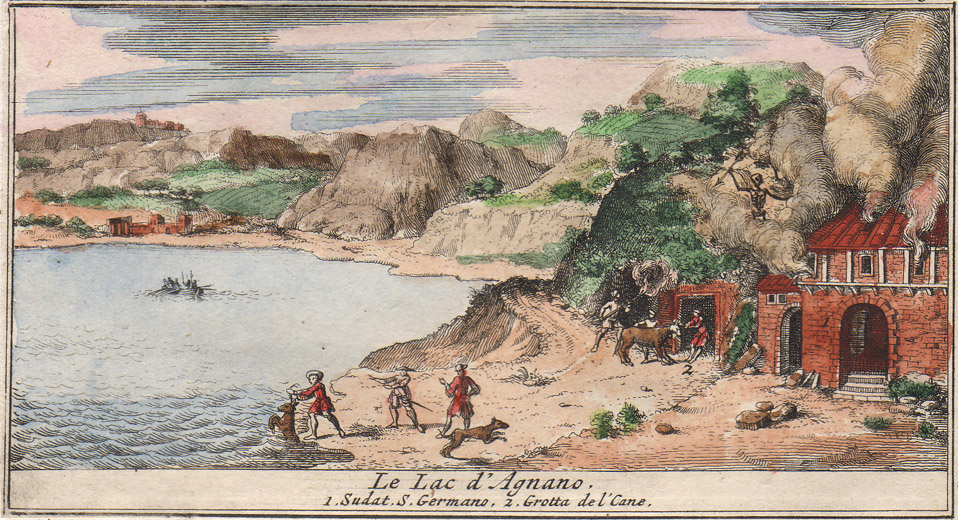
Etching depicting the Agnano lake and the Cave of Dogs in 1706. The lake had been used as a hemp maceration site for centuries, before it was drained in the 1860s.

The cultivation of hemp in southern Italy dates back to the Roman Empire, although the earliest records of its presence in the region attest that King Hiero II of Syracuse bought hemp from Gaul in the 3rd century B.C., to produce cordage for his vessels. During Roman times, a noteworthy center for the processing of hemp in Campania felix was located in Misenum, particularly for the production of hemp cordage for the ships in its important port. Most notably, refugees from Miseno eventually brought this trade to Frattamaggiore, which they reportedly founded around 850 A.D. after their hometown was raided and razed by the Saracens. After the fall of Rome, one of the first notable large-scale productions of hemp in Italy was established in the Emirate of Sicily starting from the 9th century, during the Arab domination. Cannabis cultivation in southern Italy continued during the Middle Ages, particularly for the production of textiles, with the establishment of renowned workshops under King Roger II of Sicily, which produced purple and golden fabrics, as well as textiles made from wool, hemp, and linen, for both local and foreign customers.

To regulate and increase both manufacturing and commerce, Emperor Frederick II promulgated several measures, including the establishment of annual fairs in the towns of Sulmona, Capua, Lucera, Bari, Taranto, Cosenza, Lanciano, and L'Aquila, on the occasions of their respective patron saints and lasting several days. At the time, the Kingdom of Sicily exported on average a third of its crops, which included hemp; and its maritime trade reached most notably the Byzantine Empire, Egypt, Spain, and France. Furthermore, in addition to local attendees, the aforementioned fairs also attracted merchants from the rest of the Italian states, Dalmatia, and Greece; while the Maritime Republics on the Tyrrhenian Sea supplied their arsenals with both raw and woven hemp from the ports of Naples and Amalfi. Under Frederick II, the exportation of hemp was subjected to the jus exiturae (i.e., right of exit), that is an exit tariff equal to 3 grana for every 100 canes of hemp; while the price of 30 canes of hemp was reported equal to 3 tarì and 8 grana, in a 1290 expenses register from the household of King Charles II of Naples.

=== Industrial cannabis production ===
The coats of arms of the comuni of (A) Arzano, depicting a bundle of three green branches (i.e., two of hemp and one of flax); and (B) San Marco Evangelista, depicting a single hemp plant in gold.

La canapa per l'Annunziata, o seminata o nata.
Note. Proverb on the sowing period for hemp, meaning The hemp for the Annunciation, either sown or born, with the Feast of the Annunciation being celebrated on 25 March.

In 1231, Frederick II promulgated the Constitutiones Augustales, which included provisions to protect populated places in the Kingdom from the decomposition fumes emanating from the maceration basins. In particular, the provisions ordered that no one should be permitted to soak flax or hemp in water within a mile of any city or near a Castrum so that the quality of the air may not, as we have learned for certain, be corrupted by it, while anyone violating the decree would be brought to the royal court and have their macerated goods confiscated. In regard to the disposal of any waste from the retting process, the provisions also stipulate that any filth that make a stench should be thrown a quarter of a mile out of the district or into the sea or river by the persons to whom they belong, while anyone doing otherwise would have to pay the royal court as much as one augustalis, depending on the quantity of the illegal waste.

After significant public protests, King Charles II of Anjou decreed the closure and reclamation of several maceration sites around Naples in 1300 and 1306, even though the Royal coffers significantly benefited from renting state-owned wetlands and canals for the retting of both flax and hemp. Similar reclamation projects followed during the Angevin and Aragonese periods, until King Alfonso I of Aragon permanently moved the retting sites to the shallow Agnano lake, about 8 km (4.97 mi) west of Naples. Moreover, the Miano-Agnano highway, known as Via dei Canapi (i.e., Hemp street), was constructed to facilitate the transport of hemp between the fields North of Naples and the maceration sites at the lake, while also avoiding population centers. Despite two temporary bans, the first one during the plague of 1656 and the second one following the death of one of the sons of Viceroy Gaspar de Bracamonte from an infection in Pozzuoli in 1663, retting activities continued in the Phlegraean Fields until the second half of the 19th century, when they became unprofitable. Subsequently, the Agnano lake was decontaminated and drained between 1866 and 1870, with its surface at the time spanning between 90 ha (0.9 km^{2}; 0.3 mi^{2}) and 130 ha (1.3 km^{2}; 0.5 mi^{2}) within a volcanic crater about 2.07 km (1.29 mi) wide. This land reclamation project was carried out to remove the rotting fumes, as well as to prevent further outbreaks of the mosquito-borne malaria by reducing the local habitat of the Anopheles mosquito.

Nevertheless, from the 17th century onwards, the hemp cultivation area in Campania steadily increased to include the southern part of the modern-day Province of Caserta, and most of the former Province of Naples, including the sides of Mount Vesuvius. Furthermore, according to an economic census compiled under King Joachim-Napoleon, during the French rule of the Kingdom of Naples between 1806 and 1815, hemp fields were mainly located in the fertile Volturno river basin, between the comuni of Capua, Caserta, Maddaloni, and Aversa; while significant exports of hemp from Naples towards the rest of Europe were recorded around 1840. The legacy of the once-flourishing industry of hemp cultivation and processing in the area is attested in the toponyms of several streets and towns around Naples, while the comuni of Arzano and San Marco Evangelista even show a hemp plant in their coats of arms.

=== Hemp rope production ===
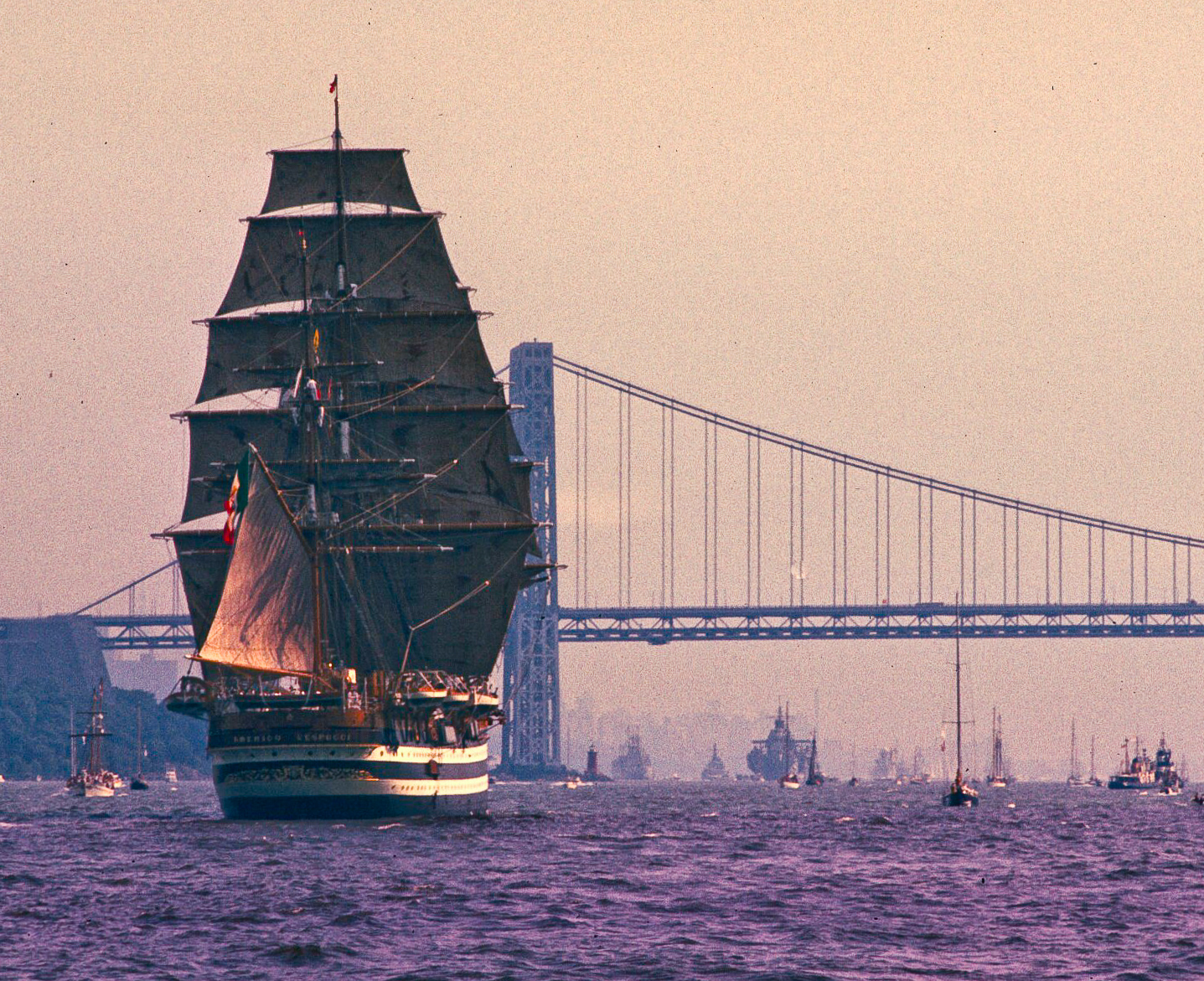
The NS Amerigo Vespucci sailing in New York Harbor, as part of the Grand Parade of Sailing Ships of 1976.

The oldest corderia that is still operating in Italy was established in 1796 in Castellammare di Stabia, in the Kingdom of Naples, to manufacture high-quality cordage from hemp as part of the local shipyard, which was founded in 1773 by royal decree of King Ferdinand IV of Naples. Two notable examples of Royal Italian Navy ships that were later built at said shipyard, and also supplied by the associated ropeyard, were the training ships RNS Cristoforo Colombo and Amerigo Vespucci. The RNS Cristoforo Colombo, launched in 1928, was a full-rigged three-masted tall ship that had twenty-six sails made from textile hemp, for a total area of about 2,500 m^{2} (26,910 ft^{2}), while the rigging ropes were made of both hemp and Manila hemp. The slightly larger twin ship NS Amerigo Vespucci, launched in 1931 and still in operation with the Italian Navy to the present day, has twenty-four sails made from textile hemp, for a total area of about 2,635 m^{2} (28,363 ft^{2}) and a thickness ranging between 2 mm (0.08 in) and 4 mm (0.16 in), while the rigging ropes are currently made of both Manila hemp and nylon.

Another noteworthy site for the production of ropes in the Kingdom of the Two Sicilies was located near the Ear of Dionysius in Syracuse, Sicily, where the wide humid spaces within the Grotta dei Cordari (i.e., Cave of the Ropemakers) have been used as ropewalks for centuries. The ropemakers of Syracuse formed their own guild, and in 1577 they were granted their own church, which subsequently became known as San Nicolò ai Cordari. At the time, the local hemp cultivation was significantly developed and profitable, and the produced fibers were in part used by the cordari to provide a moderate supply of various kinds of ropes. The decline of this industry began when the local farmers started to switch to more profitable crops, while the few remaining artisan families continued their trade by sourcing hemp from Campania, until the last ropemakers left the Cave in 1984 due to the risk of collapse.

== Papal States ==
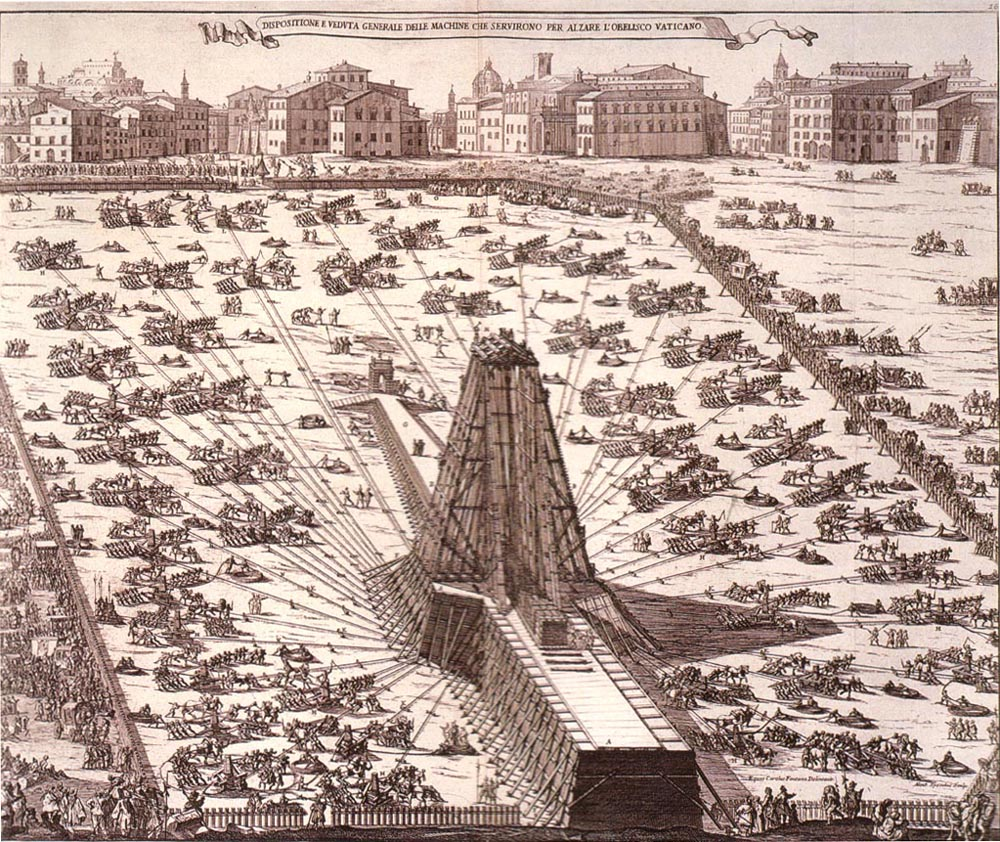
Engraving depicting the lifting tower and the hemp cordage used to re-erect the Vatican obelisk at the center of St. Peter's Square on 10 September 1586.

And I will extol hemp and the true culture of such a noble shoot, that in the Fields of Italy and, more than anywhere else, in the lands of Felsina and in the nearby most flourishing enclosure of Cento, it rises and grows green and forms shady forests. (Note: Felsina is the ancient Etruscan city that later became Bologna.)
Note. Excerpt translated from Il Canapajo by Baruffaldi, which attests the importance of hemp cultivation in the region.

Although only limited information is available on the cultivation of industrial cannabis in the Italian peninsula before 1000 A.D., historical-ecclesiastical accounts from the Early Middle Ages reported that a Roman community of artisans involved in the processing of hemp established workshops and dwellings around the late 6th – early 7th century A.D., in and around the remains of the Basilica Julia, in the Roman Forum. The trade of these canapari mainly consisted in the production of hemp twines and ropes, as well as possibly wickers, sacks, and rough textiles; and the spiritual life of the community centered around the small church of Santa Maria in Cannapara, which derived its name from said activities and was also located among the porticoes of the Basilica, until its demolition in the 16th century.

In any case, the cultivation of hemp in what are now Umbria and the Marches was already widespread by the mid-13th century, as attested in the cartulary of the Abbey of Sassovivo, and in ancient statutes of the town of Foligno, as well as other towns in the March of Ancona. After the affirmation of Papal rule over Romagna in the early 16th century, hemp and wheat became two of the main exports of the Papal States, so much so that several regulations emanated by Pope Paul III in 1543, (Note: The other two secondary sources report the date of 1523, however at that time Paul III (PP. 1534–1549) was not yet Pope, but a Cardinal-Bishop.) and later reaffirmed by Pope Sixtus V in 1586, defined the processing standards required for hemp for it to be exported. In fact, the exportation of raw hemp from Bologna, when it was temporarily under Papal rule, had already been forbidden by a bull from Pope Gregory XI in 1376, to allow the inhabitants to keep the revenue derived from the processing of hemp plants, thus providing work to as many as 12,000 people in the city at the time. In addition, the export ban also prompted Venice to further increase its hemp cultivation area, particularly in the area around Padua.

=== Industrial use of cannabis ===
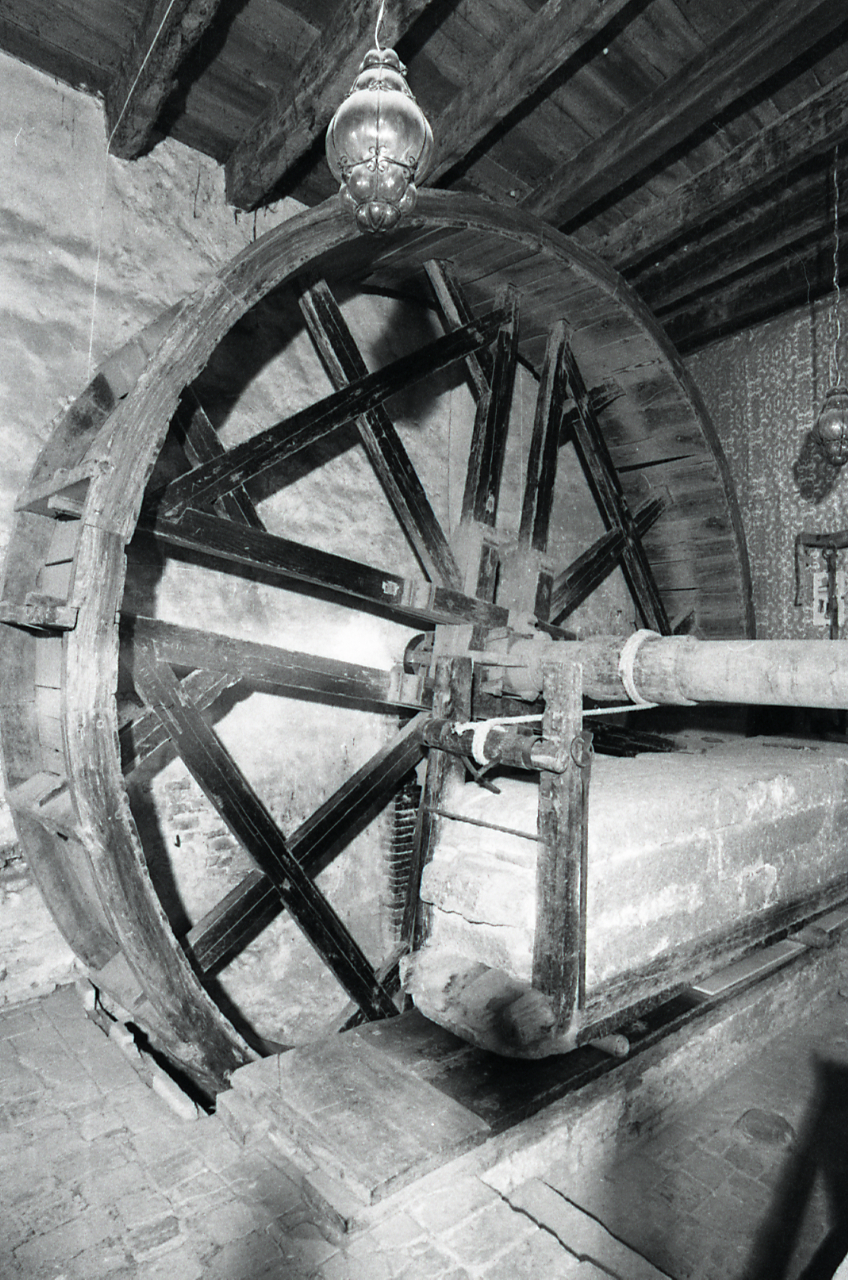
Historical mangle, built in 1633 and still being used to press fabrics with a 5.5 t (5.4 long tons) stone, at the Marchi family's workshop in Sant'Arcangelo di Romagna.

Torta tibi funes dat cannabis : utile semen oviparis : gravidis sed nocet ille cibus. (Note: In the second source, the harmfulness of hemp seeds for pregnant women is hypothesized to be due to their high oil content, which could cause intestinal irritation when consumed in large quantities.)
Note. Latin couplet on the usefulness of hemp, meaning Twisted cannabis gives you ropes : seed useful for the oviparous : but that food is harmful to pregnant women.

Hemp plants were used in their entirety, namely the roots were used as firewood, the woody stalk fragments were dipped in sulfur to produce matches, the seeds were used as food for livestock, and the fiber was used to make fishing nets, ropes to be used in various agricultural activities, and textiles such as packaging for fine linens, flour sacks, family clothing, and trousseaus for daughters' weddings. As they are particularly resistant, hemp fibers were also mixed with the more delicate wool to produce mezzalana (i.e., half-wool, with hemp being used for warp and wool for weft) fabrics, which were especially suitable for wear-prone textile products. Similarly, mixtures of hemp fibers with either linen or wool, known as pignolato (i.e., pine nuts patterned), were widely used in the area around Ferrara for the production of clothes, as reported by the local writer Riccobaldo in his Sermo de ritibus antiquorum.

To the present day, hemp is still being used in the area around Sant'Arcangelo di Romagna to produce textiles such as blankets, pillowcases, and tablecloths, decorated with copper stamps in the traditional green and rust colors, through a centuries-old artisan process that first requires a heavy mangle to smoothen and soften the initially rough and rigid hand-woven fabric. The production of hemp textiles was once so ubiquitous in Emilia-Romagna, where every farmhouse had a loom as part of the subsistence economy, that it even influenced the culinary history of the Region. More specifically, the similar local pasta varieties of Garganelli and Maccheroni al pettine (i.e., macaroni on reed) are still traditionally prepared by cutting a small square of fresh egg-based pasta, rolling it on a stick, and then pressing it on a wooden reed to create transverse ridges.

Another significant application of industrial cannabis was in papermaking, which originated in Han China and subsequently spread throughout the Muslim world, namely reaching Morocco and Spain during the 12th century, before arriving in Italy in the 13th century. In particular, the first paper mill in Italy was established in 1276 in Fabriano, where the local artisans improved upon the Arab techniques to produce highly resistant and durable paper, which slowly became the most widespread writing material since it was more convenient and cheaper than parchment. The raw materials used for the production of the paper included hemp and linen, and the calcium-rich soil typically found in many parts of Italy caused the cultivated cannabis sativa plants to produce a light-colored fiber, which resulted in a creamy white paper, while the long fibers gave the paper strength and flexibility, which was a desirable feature for books and manuscripts. Most notably, it has been suggested that German inventor and craftsman Johannes Gutenberg used hemp paper imported from Italy to print 140 copies of his Bible in the 15th century.

Historically, hemp cords were used by the Apostolic Chancery to fasten the bulla to the Pope's correspondence when such letters, known as litterae cum filo canapis, contained either orders or a papal delegation in a dispute. Conversely, Papal letters that brought some benefit to the recipient had the bulla fastened using silk cords, and thus they were known as litterae cum serico. Furthermore, hemp ropes were also widely used for the numerous architectural and engineering projects that took place in Rome, and Foligno in particular is cited by architect Domenico Fontana as a major producer of hemp fiber. As an example, Roman ropemakers used fiber from Foligno to produce the significant amount of cordage that was used to move the Vatican obelisk from the spina of the Circus of Nero to the Vatican Hill, and then re-erect it at the center of St. Peter's Square in 1586, for a total of 4,700 canne (10.5 km; 6.65 mi) of rope with an average thickness equal to a third of a palm (7.17 cm; 2.82 in).

==== Industrial cannabis cultivation ====
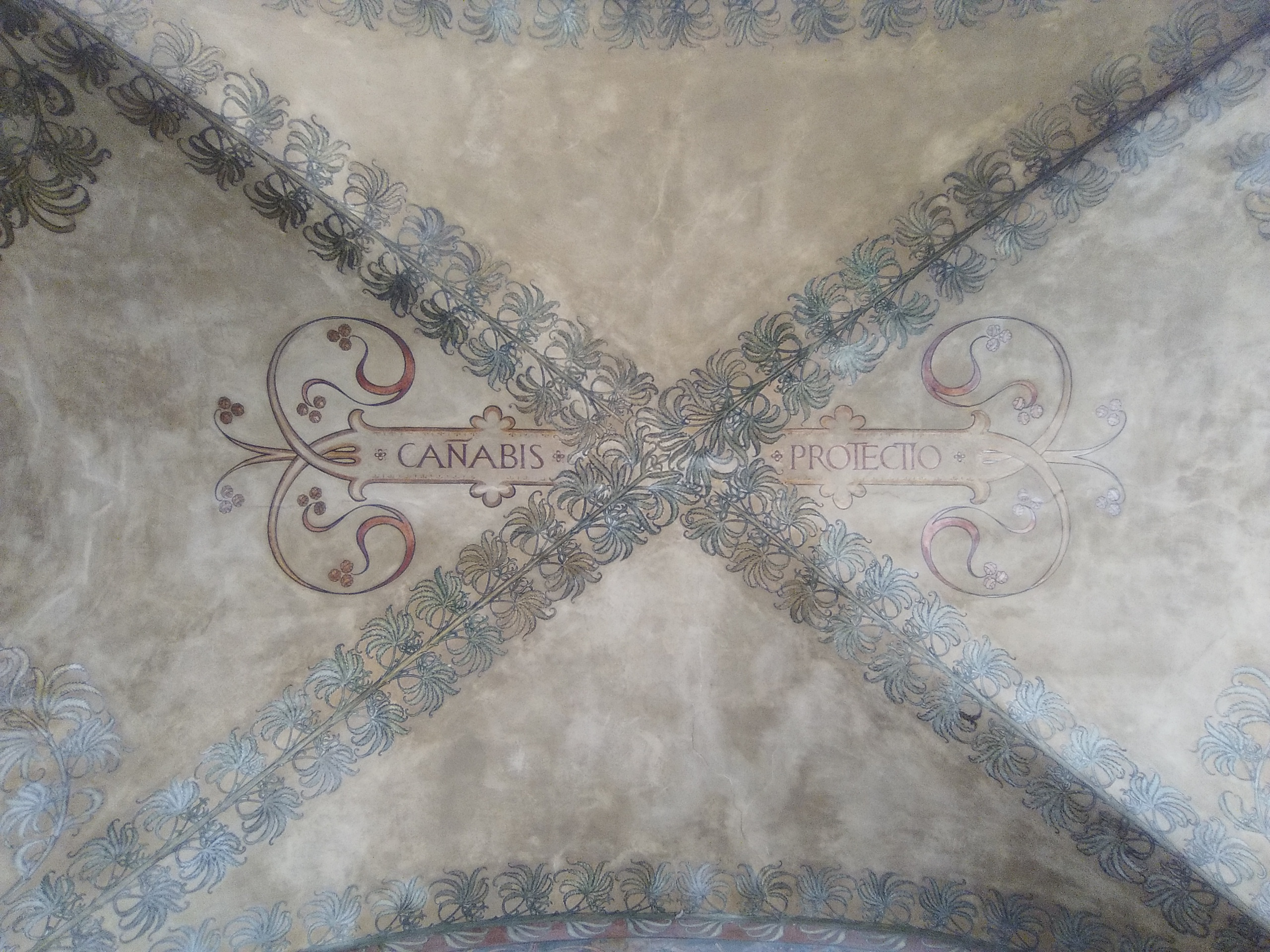
Fresco depicting cannabis plants along the ribs of the central vault, as well as the middle section of the inscription described on the left.

Panis vita, cañabis protectio, vinum laetitia. (Note: The tilde in ñ, visible in the picture shown on the right, was used historically as a superscript abbreviation for nn.)
Note. Latin inscription meaning Bread is life, hemp is protection, wine is joy, painted across three decorated vaults of the porticoes of Bologna, under the Scappi tower, where market stalls selling such products would once be set up.

Another important center for cannabis production was located near Viterbo, in Lazio, in the town of Canepina, which derives its name from the once locally widespread cultivation of the plant. In particular, the lands surrounding the town are rich in water, which flowed along a multitude of streams and rivulets, while the predominantly stony grounds caused the local hemp to acquire a pure white color, which made it particularly sought after in all contemporary markets, and especially by Roman noblewomen.

In Umbria, industrial cannabis was cultivated both in the river valleys, such as along the Nera river banks, and in the Apennine Mountains, such as in Gavelli, Monteleone di Spoleto, and Castelluccio di Norcia, with the plant being able to survive elevations of 1,500 m (4,900 ft) a.s.l., at the highest. Moreover, following several land reclamation projects carried out between 1561 and 1562 in the swampy areas between the comuni of Foligno, Trevi, Montefalco, and Bevagna, under Francesco Jacobilli, and in 1588 in the swamp of Colfiorito, vast sections of the newly recovered fertile farm land were turned into hemp fields, which resulted in a significant increase in the local hemp production already in 1563. Most of these reclaimed lands belonged to the Jacobilli noble family, who leased them to other noble families, and these families then subleased them to the eventual farmers, who would then grow hemp and wheat on a rotational basis, switching their crops every two or three years. The legacy of the cultivation and processing of industrial cannabis is attested in the traditional tools, toponyms, and even nursery rhymes, that can still be found in the area around Foligno.

Conversely, in the Marches, hemp fields were less common in the countryside, with the exception of the elevated valleys of the Potenza and Chienti rivers, although they steadily increased during the 18th century around Ascoli Piceno and the Tronto river valley, to accommodate the contemporary population and economic growths. In particular, besides the increased needs of the general population, the higher demand for hemp was also prompted by the expanding maritime trade and fishery sectors in the nearby Adriatic coast, as well as the establishment of the free port of Ancona in 1732. Moreover, another noteworthy center for the production of ropes and fishing nets in the Papal States was located in San Benedetto del Tronto, where ropemakers used hemp grown in Ferrara, Ascoli Piceno, as well as other cultivation centers in Romagna.

In the territory of Bologna, which firmly returned under Papal rule in the early 16th century, the cultivation of cannabis increased significantly between the 14th and 17th centuries, with the development of new production techniques that remained in use until the 19th century. Starting from farm lands located between the comuni of Bologna, Budrio, and Cento, the mass cultivation of cannabis spread to large parts of Emilia and Romagna, particularly around the cities of Bologna, Ferrara, Modena, Rovigo, Ravenna, and Cesena. Initially sustained by the demand for hemp fiber from the Venetian Arsenal, as well as from local customers, in the 17th century producers in Bologna started exporting hemp to shipyards in Northwestern Europe, where it was used for the manufacture of ropes and sails. The importance of hemp cultivation in the region is attested in the 1741 poem Il Canapajo, in which Ferrarese presbyter and scholar Girolamo Baruffaldi pays close attention to the agronomic aspects of its cultivation. The last boost in the local production of industrial cannabis occurred during the 19th century, particularly after 1870, with significant applications in the industrial sector.

==== Dew retting and water retting ====
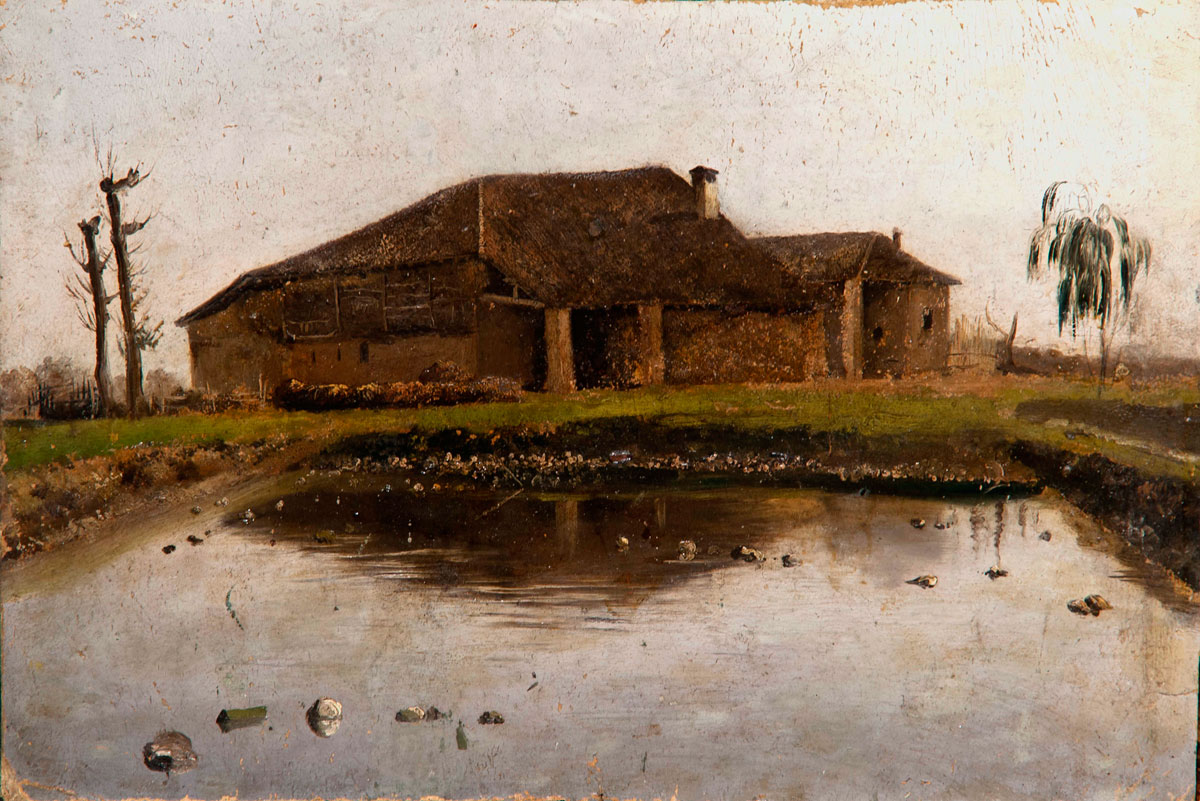
Landscape painting by Luigi Bertelli depicting a 19th-century farmhouse behind a water basin used for processing hemp.

During the Middle Ages, the use of hemp fiber in the Padan plain followed a self-sufficiency model, in which the limited production simply aimed at meeting the needs of local families; and the maceration of hemp stalks consisted in their repeated exposure to night-dew on grassy meadows, which was favored by the rainier conditions that characterized the 13th and 14th centuries. From the early 16th century onwards, the use of dedicated water retting tanks became more common with the establishment of hemp as a valuable crop in the fields of Bologna and Modena, and the introduction of the mezzadria farming system. At the same time, the manufacturing and trade of products derived from hemp fiber underwent a significant expansion, especially in the area of Bologna, with the establishment of local guilds of scutchers, ropemakers, and drapers. As an indication of the historical ubiquity of the aforementioned water basins in the Po river valley, a 2019 survey of the Province of Ferrara revealed the presence of 1,907 surviving water retting tanks averaging 1,066 m^{2} (0.26 acres) in area each, based on digital cartography and aerial photos, which resulted in an average density of 0.72 tanks/km^{2} (1.86 tanks/sq mi).

In the areas around Foligno and Ascoli Piceno, city laws sometimes dating back to 14th century statutes and subsequently updated up until the 18th century, banned maceration sites both inside and outside city walls for public health reasons based on the miasma theory, similarly to the regulations implemented in southern Italy. Elsewhere in the Papal States, the miasms produced by the maceration of both hemp and flax had already prompted the authorities of Viterbo in 1278 to pledge to move the processing sites away from the populated areas, in order to encourage Pope Nicholas III to move the Roman Curia back to the city. As a notable example of historical health scare, after outbreaks of epidemic fever occurred in Imola in 1599 and 1602, a connection between the fevers and the miasms emanating from the maceration sites was argued in the De morbis qui Imolae et alibi communiter vagati sunt commentariolum by doctor Giovan Battista Codronchi, who successfully campaigned for the removal of these sites from the local area. Despite the health-related restrictions, however, the hemp industry was so widespread that the water retting was still carried out almost everywhere, even within urban centers; while several other laws regulated the production of hemp fiber and ropes, to ensure high-quality products.

In the bassa Padana (i.e., the lower Po river valley), the maceration tanks were often excavated in the most depressed areas of the farms, in order to facilitate the collection of rainwater through drains, and they were normally used by multiple families. Furthermore, the tanks were also used to draw water for the vegetable gardens, to bathe whole families during the summer, to do their laundries, as well as to farm fish and to raise geese and ducklings. At present, the remains of the surviving maceri are protected by strict regulations and some of these basins are occasionally used by former canapai (i.e., hemp workers) to macerate hemp for educational purposes. Historical retting tanks can also be requalified, such as a former macero in the comune of Nonantola that was turned into a refuge for reptiles and amphibians in 2012, in order to increase the local biodiversity.

=== Cannabis consumption ===
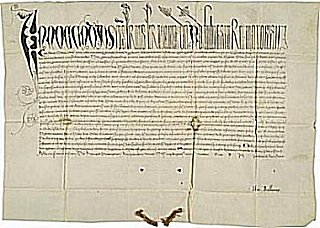
Papal bull Summis desiderantes affectibus, signed by Pope Innocent VIII on 9 December 1484.

La Madona 'd setembar quând l'è arivè, i canavòn te da taiê.
Note. Old Romagnol proverb on when to harvest hemp seeds, meaning When the Madonna of September arrives, you must cut the hemp, with the Feast of the Nativity of the Virgin Mary being celebrated on 8 September.

Between the 16th and 18th centuries, several recipe books were published that included the contemporary culinary uses of cannabis; for instance, the Epulario by Giovanni de Roselli describes a recipe to make twelve soups of hemp seeds with meat. In the 17th century treatise L'economia del cittadino in villa, Bolognese agronomist and gastronome Vincenzo Tanara further describes a particular sauce made using hemp seeds, to be served with boiled meat, which could be either turkey, chicken, or beef. At the time, the high nutritional value of hemp seeds was well known, and they could still be used to produce bread during droughts, when wheat was scarce. The botanical aspects, different uses, qualities, and contraindications of cannabis plants were also described by Perugian physician and botanist Castore Durante in his Herbario Novo, a compendium on medicinal plants from Europe, the East Indies, and the West Indies.

In regard to the recreational use of cannabis, it has been suggested that Pope Innocent VIII outright banned the drug with his 1484 anti-witchcraft bull Summis desiderantes affectibus, to prevent the celebration of black masses. However, neither the plant nor its use appear to be explicitly mentioned in either the 1484 bull or the Malleus Maleficarum, a 1486 treatise on the prosecution of witches, in which the papal bull appears as a preface. Nevertheless, as the bull specifically mentions people falling prey to incantations, spells, conjurations, and other accursed charms and crafts, recreational cannabis could have still been banned possibly due to its mind-altering effects being seen at the time either as the external action of supernatural entities, or as a sign of spiritual corruption. To the present day, the Catechism of the Catholic Church considers the use of drugs outside of strictly therapeutic purposes as a grave offense in violation of the Fifth Commandment, since they inflict grave damage on human health and life. Moreover, the illegal production and trafficking of drugs are considered to be a direct co-operation in evil, since they encourage people to practices gravely contrary to the moral law.

== Republic of Genoa ==
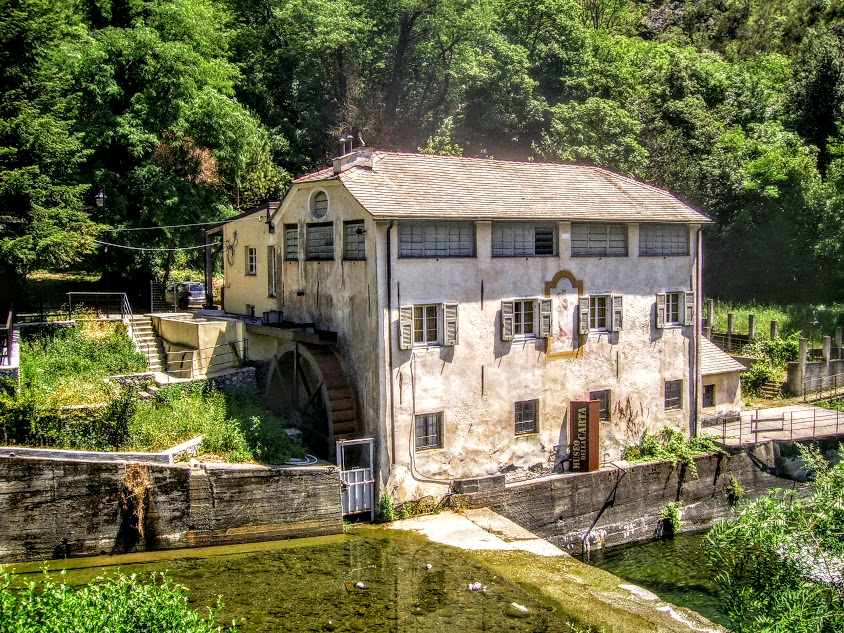
View of the Paper Museum of Mele, near Genoa. The 18th-century paper mill closed down in 1985, and was reopened as a museum in 1997.

In Europa altra carta non s'adopra che quella de' Genovesi.
Note. Statement on the importance of paper production in the Republic of Genoa, meaning In Europe no other paper is used than that of the Genoese, made by merchants addressing the Genoese Senate in 1567.

The production of paper in the Republic of Genoa began in the early 15th century along the Leira river valley to the west of Genoa, which was favored by the presence of several torrents that could provide power to the numerous paper mills. In particular, papermaker Grazioso Damiani left Fabriano in 1406 and moved first to Sampierdarena and then to Voltri, where he opened his workshop. In 1424, Damiani lamented to the Council of Elders of Genoa the difficulty and high costs in sourcing the raw fiber for paper production (e.g. from ropes and rags), and thus requested and obtained exclusive rights to Genoese cordage for at least five years. In the following centuries, the expanding paper industry became significantly profitable in the Leira and Cerusa river valleys. In particular, the areas of Voltri and Mele became well renowned internationally during the 16th century for the quality and durability of their bookworm-resistant paper, which was especially sought after by the Royal Chanceries of Spain, Portugal, and England.

=== Paper production ===
Tutte e strasse van a Ütri.
Note. Old Ligurian saying on the monopoly on raw materials for paper production in Voltri, following the plea by papermaker Damiani, meaning All the rags go to Voltri.

The Republic of Genova was particularly protectionist in regard to its paper industry, in particular it forbade master craftsmen to emigrate, thus safeguarding its trade secrets; and made the export of any type of rag or papermaking tool illegal, thus ensuring the supply of essential raw materials and equipments. The punishment for violating such restrictions could range from paying heavy fines to becoming a galley slave in the Genoese navy. By the second half of the 16th century, around 50 papeterie (i.e., paper mills) were established in Voltri alone, with their number peaking by the 1700s at around 150 paper mills spread between Voltri, Mele, Arenzano, and Varazze. This made the Republic of Genoa the main hub in Europe for paper production between the 16th and 18th centuries, although other important centers also began to emerge in the same period in Piedmont, Venetia, Tuscany, France, Germany, Holland, and England.

For several centuries, the sheets of paper were individually produced from rags made from textile fibers such as hemp, flax, and cotton; which were sourced from either Piedmont, Lombardy, or other locations overseas. From the 19th century onwards, the development of continuous paper making machines, combined with the use of cellulose obtained from coniferous or broad-leaved wood, led to an increase in paper production, albeit at the expense of its quality. The decline of papermaking in the Duchy of Genoa came with the introduction of the steam engine during the Industrial Revolution, which made watermills redundant and the impervious Genoese valleys unpractical as factory locations. In the post-war period, almost all of the 43 remaining paper mills along the Leira river valley closed down within a couple of decades, with only two currently remaining in the comune of Mele. One of the two factories utilizes machinery for industrial production, (Note: The cited documentary shows the Caviglia paper factory in Mele, a few months before it closed down in 1997. Since the actual factory being discussed is not identified, the footage is presented as an example of the local industrial paper production.) while the other still applies traditional techniques as part of the Paper Museum of Mele.

== Duchy of Modena and Reggio ==
An early example of cultivation of sinsemilla (i.e., seedless) hemp crops was documented in the Duchy of Modena and Reggio by local biologist and physiologist Lazzaro Spallanzani on 8 September 1767, when he observed the development of inflorescences on female hemp plants over a month after all male plants had been removed from the fields. In particular, it was customary at the time for Reggian and Modenese farmers to uproot all male hemp plants around 2–3 August, while leaving the female plants in the fields well into September.

== Duchy of Milan ==
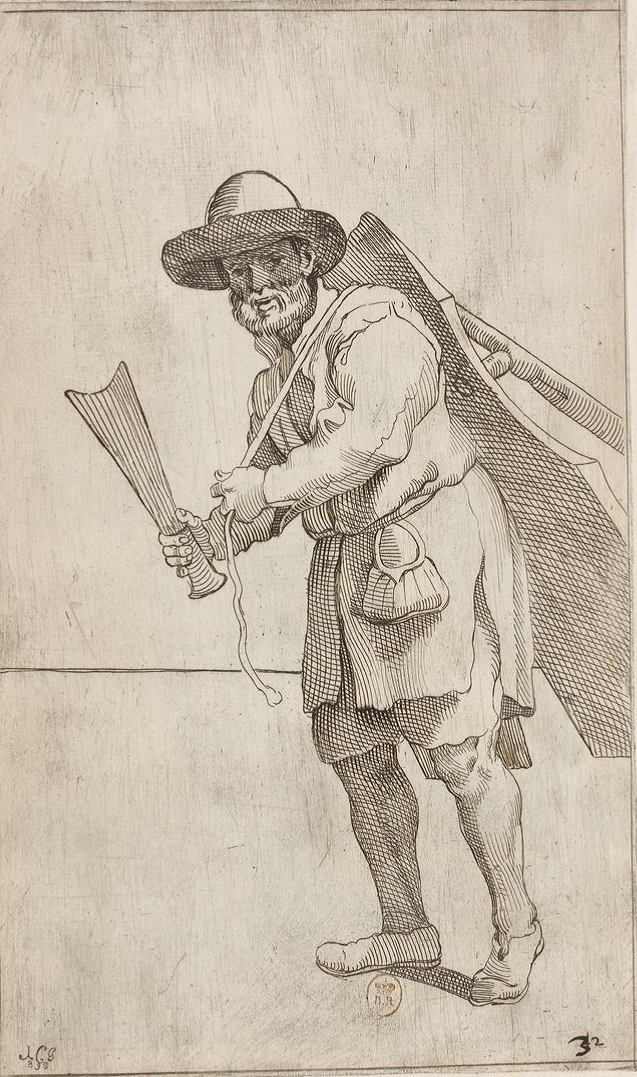
Engraving by Annibale Carracci and Simon Guillain depicting a tanner of hemp and flax, holding a spatula-like tool and carrying a gràmola, in 1646.

One of the oldest trade guilds in the Duchy of Milan was the Università dei Merzari (a.k.a. Merciai), which was founded in the town of Paratico on 15 September 1489 by decree of Duke Ludovico Sforza, and became the Università dei Merzari et Cordari in 1560 under King Philip II of Spain. In 1582, the Università dei Mercanti di Cordaria e Canevazzi (i.e., Corporation of Merchants of Ropes and Rags), which used hemp fibers to produce several types of ropes and textiles for different uses, split from the aforementioned guild over significant internal disputes between the merzari and the cordari. The activities of these guilds continued in the Duchy for several centuries until the suppression of the Corporazioni d'Arte e Mestieri (i.e., Corporations of Arts and Crafts), by decree of Emperor Joseph II, on 4 March 1787.

=== Hemp rope production ===
A renowned historical center for the production of hemp ropes in the Duchy of Milan was in the village of Castelponzone, which is now a frazione of the comune of Scandolara Ravara. As attested by its name, the fortified medieval hamlet was strongly connected to the Ponzone family from nearby Cremona, ever since Ponzino Ponzone acquired it and reconstructed the pre-existing local stronghold in the early 14th century; and its importance grew after Duke Filippo Maria Visconti granted the land as a fief to Galeazzo Ponzone in 1416. Afterwards, the Counts hired ropemakers from Tuscany to train local workers, and their trade became the main productive activity of the area for centuries, initially using hemp locally grown and processed, while later sourcing it from major production centers, such as Modena and Ferrara. From the preparation of the hemp fiber to the final polishing of the rope, the various stages of the production involved the entire family of a ropemaker, both adults and children, with the latter for instance usually being given the task of spinning the wheel at a regular rate. The types of locally produced ropes ranged from those commonly used for farming activities to the thicker hawsers and shrouds used in large ships, and over time these ropes were being sold in various Regions of Italy and even exported to Russia, France, Spain, and Germany. Most notably, ropes form Castelponzone were used for the rigging of the SS Rex, which was launched in 1931; while anecdotal accounts from locals report on an order from the Imperial Russian Navy that required the combined effort of twelve ropemakers to fulfill, and included the production of a 120 m (390 ft) long and 400 kg (880 lb) heavy rope.

The production of hemp ropes remained high throughout the 19th century, albeit with alternating phases, while the introduction of semi-automated systems around 1930 and the use of electricity made the work easier, when compared to the traditional process. Nevertheless, the local sector began to decline during the 20th century due to the reduced demand caused by the expansion of steam-powered vessels and the competition from cheaper natural fibers (e.g. cotton, jute, abacá, and Manila hemp), despite the adjustments that were attempted by switching from hemp to imported fibers such as sisal and Manila. During the interwar period, hemp was sourced from Bologna, Ferrara, and Rovigo, and then processed by the ropemakers, who then sold the produced ropes on a piece rate basis according to their weight, with the larger family businesses producing the thickest ropes for the Navy. The introduction of synthetic fibers (e.g. rayon and nylon), the extended use of manual labor due to low mechanization, and the competition from more profitable crops (e.g. sugar beet, specialized orchards, and other horticultural crops) eventually caused the centuries-old local activity to disappear. The legacy of the once-flourishing industry is attested by the Museum of the Ropemakers in Castelponzone, which includes a complete collection of traditional tools used in different periods to manufacture ropes, as well as a vast collection of ropes, ranging from those used for horse harnesses to heavier ropes intended for either agricultural work or seafaring.

=== Cannabis consumption ===
In 2023, researchers from the University of Milan and the Policlinico of Milan published a scientific research paper on the analytical evidence of the use of cannabis plants in Milan, for either medical or recreational purposes, during the 17th century. In particular, out of the nine femoral bone samples that were studied, archaeotoxicological analyses revealed the presence of both Delta-9-tetrahydrocannabinol and cannabidiol in those belonging to a 45–54 years old female and a 16–20 years old male, in what is reportedly the first physical evidence of cannabis use during the Modern Age, both in Italy and in Europe.

The biological samples were recovered from the crypt of the Ospedale Maggiore di Milano, in a section of the church of the hospital that was used to bury the deceased patients from 1638 to 1697; therefore, the studied individuals lived in the context of a severe social decline brought about by the Great Plague of Milan, which almost halved the city population between 1629 and 1631. The absence of references to cannabis in the pharmacopoeia present in the archives suggests that the plant was not being administered as medical treatment by the hospital at the time, while other possible explanations for the presence of the two cannabinoids include recreational use, self-medication, administration by doctors in other medical facilities, as well as occupational and involuntary exposure.

== Grand Duchy of Tuscany ==
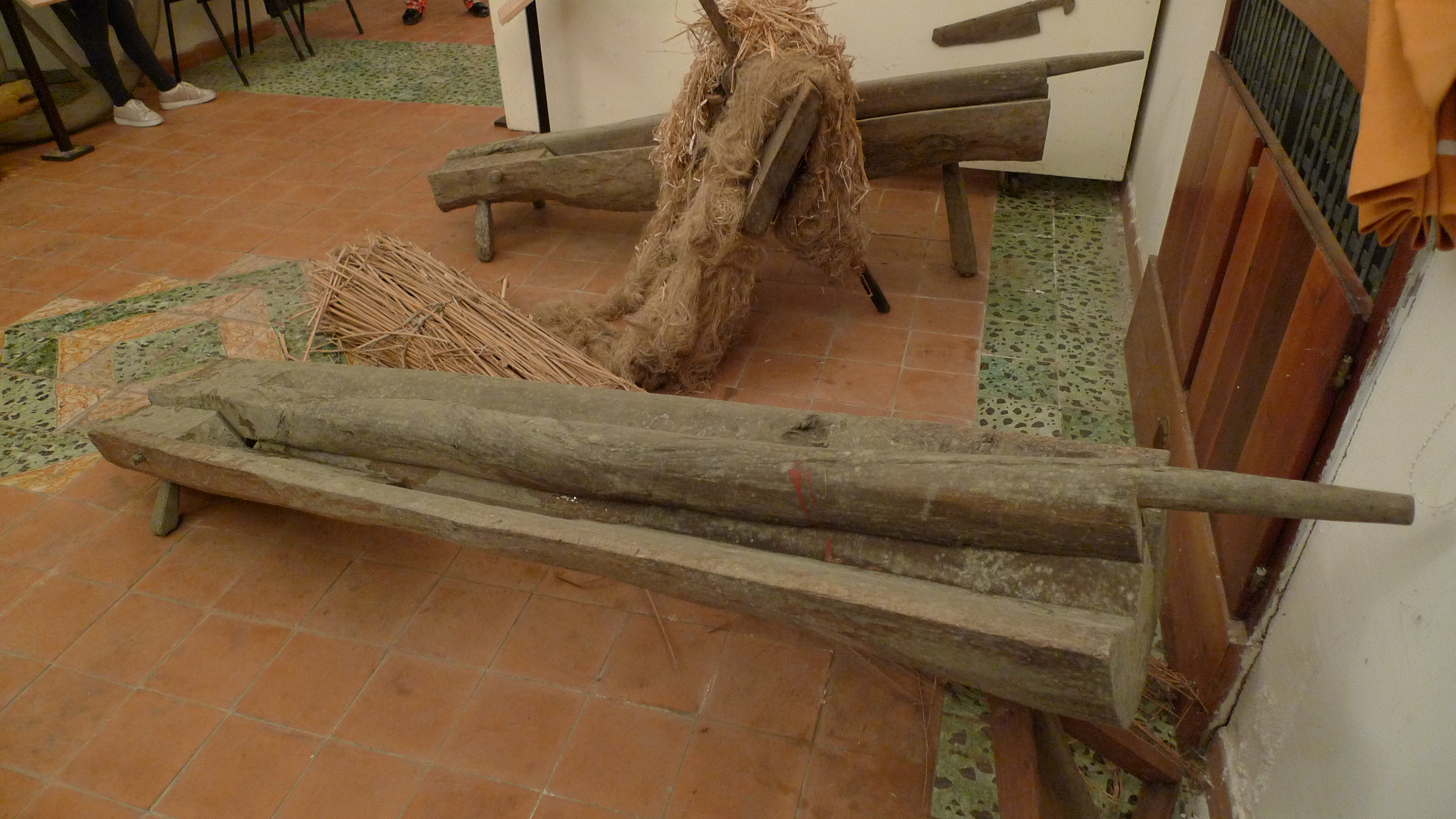
Two wooden macennole (a.k.a. maciulle), with both intact hemp stalks and scutched fiber in-between, on display at the Museum of Farming Culture in San Nicola la Strada.

So di che poco canape s'allaccia

Un'anima gentil, quand'ella è sola,

E non è chi per lei difesa faccia.

Note. Tercet from the Triumph of Love by Petrarch, on how easily a lonely soul can be conquered, meaning I know how little hemp can bind : A gentle soul, when she's alone, : And no one is there to defend her.

In Italian poetry, references to hemp ropes can be found in several original works, including the series of poems I Trionfi, written between 1351 and 1374 by Aretine scholar and poet Francesco Petrarca; and the romance epic Orlando Furioso, written in 1516 by Reggian poet Ludovico Ariosto; as well as translated works, such as the Ancient greek Oppian poem On fishing and hunting, as translated and illustrated by Florentine naturalist and classicist Anton Maria Salvini in the 17th century. Further references to the processing of hemp can be found in the epic poem Divina Commedia, written between around 1308 and 1321 by Florentine writer and philosopher Dante Alighieri; in particular, the sinners-chewing mouths of the three-headed Lucifer are compared in Canto XXXIV of the Inferno to the maciulla (a.k.a. gràmola), a traditional tool used to break both hemp and flax. A second, less-widely accepted, reference in the earlier Canto XIV reportedly alludes to the maceration of hemp at the Bulicame thermal springs near Viterbo, when the Poet mentions the peccatrici (i.e., sinners) sharing its waters. According to this interpretation, the term would actually refer to pecsatrici or pezzatrici (i.e., hemp maceration workers); however, at the time such activities in the area around Viterbo would have taken place within dedicated piscine (i.e., water retting tanks) under the supervision of a piscinarius, who was either the owner or the tenant of one or more piscine made available for a fee.

=== Hemp in traditional sports ===
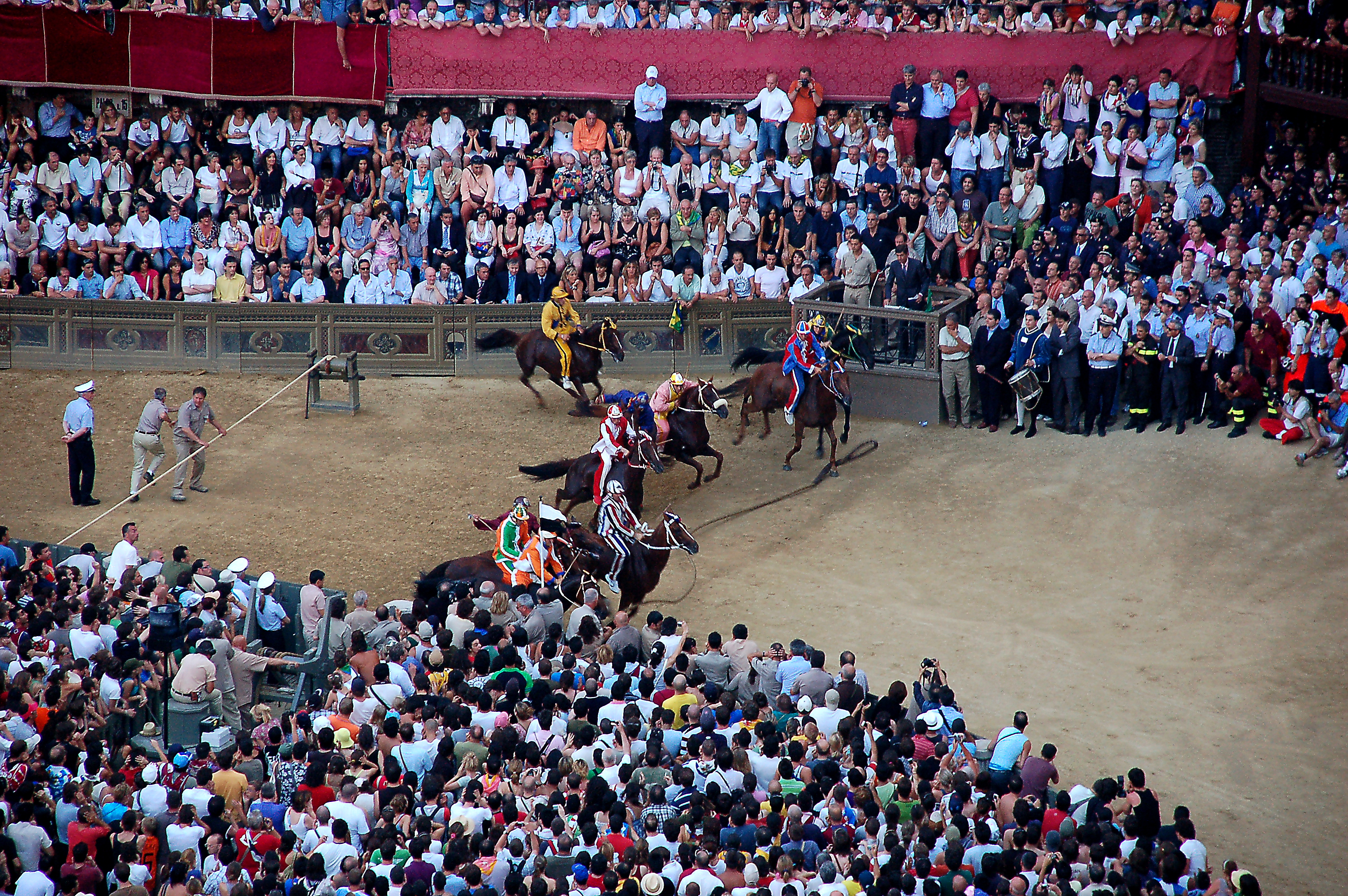
The start of the Palio di Siena, with the release of the canape by the mossiere after the rincorsa (yellow jockey) entered the starting area.

Il canapo è unto con l'argento.
Note. Old Tuscan proverb on how money facilitates things (i.e., it makes the metaphorical rope run smoothly), meaning The hemp rope is greased with silver.

In Siena, the centuries-old Palio horse race uses a 14 m (45.9 ft) long, 4 cm (1.57 in) thick, and 15 kg (33.1 lb) heavy, traditional hemp rope known as the canape, as the starting line for the horses from nine of the participating contrade. The rope is kept stretched at a height of 80 cm (31.5 in) using a winch exerting a force equivalent to 2,000 kg (4,409 lb), and the mossiere suddenly releases it by pressing the Pedal of Verrocchio, thus starting the race. The cue for the release consists in the horse from the tenth participating contrada, known as the rincorsa (i.e., the run-up), crossing a second 12 m (39.4 ft) long and 3 cm (1.18 in) thick canape placed a few meters back, marking the rear of the starting area.

Hemp strings are also traditionally used to sew together the approximately 22 cm (8.66 in) wide and 500 g (1.1 lb) heavy ball used in the calcio storico fiorentino, which is an early form of football that originated during the Middle Ages in Italy. In particular, the thick leather covering consists of four longitudinal slices alternately varnished with the colors of Florence (i.e., white and red), and made of eight triangular sections that are manually sewn together using hemp strings, while multiple internal layers of canvas make the ball as non-deformable as possible.

Elsewhere in Italy, in the Marches, the ten contrade of Fermo participate in the traditional Tiro al Canapo competition, as part of a medieval fair that culminates in the Cavalcata dell'Assunta horse race, which takes place every year on 15 August since it was reinstated in 1982. Dating back to the Middle Ages and the Renaissance, and elevated to an Olympic sport from 1900 to 1920, rope pulling competitions in Italy experienced a resurgence during local festivals in the Marches countryside in the 1950s. In fact, the Tiro al Canapo is the oldest traditional game occurring at the fair of Fermo, with the first edition taking place in 1986, while the other games include archery, flag throwing, and drum performances. During the rope pulling tournament, the ten contrade are divided in two all-play-all groups whose victors then face off in the final match, with each team consisting in six players on the platform, whose combined weight cannot exceed 551 kg (1,215 lb), and five substitute players. The number of players increases to eight for the modern-day sport, with total weight limits between 600 kg (1,323 lb) and 720 kg (1,587 lb), and the two teams pull on a 36 m (118.1 ft) long hemp rope having a diameter that ranges between 10 cm (3.94 in) and 12 cm (4.72 in).

== Kingdom of Piedmont–Sardinia ==
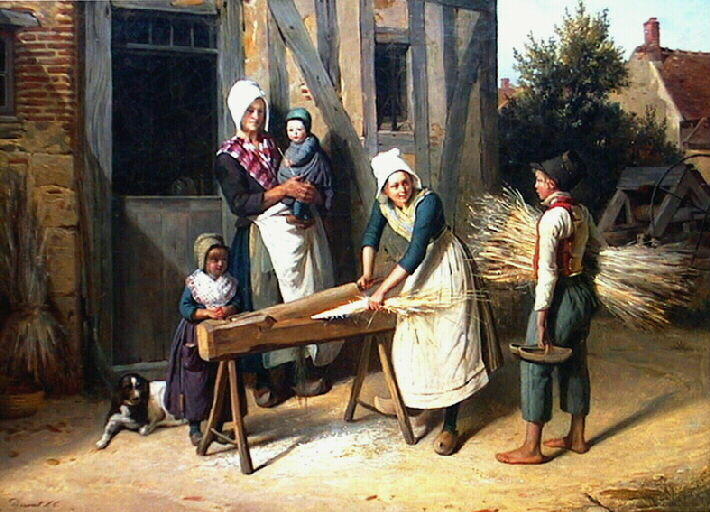
Painting by Pierre Duval Le Camus depicting 19th century peasants in front of a cottage, intent on manually breaking macerated and dried hemp.

A San Roc as gava la canva, a San Michel as gava al canvasc.
Note. Popular saying from the mountainous area of Biella on the time for harvesting the male hemp plants (for fiber) and the female ones (for seeds), meaning At Saint Roch we harvest the male hemp, at Saint Michael we harvest the female hemp, with the Feasts of the two Saints being celebrated on 16 August and 29 September, respectively.

The introduction of hemp plants in Piedmont is generally attributed to the arrival of Roman legions in what was then Cisalpine Gaul, in the 3rd century B.C., with the earliest cultivations being located in the area around modern-day Carmagnola, since it was rich in water without being swampy. Other sources date the introduction of hemp into the region to the 10th century, or alternatively its possible reintroduction, considering the severe disruption in cannabis cultivation across the entire Italian peninsula following the fall of the Western Roman Empire. Still other sources report that hemp cultivation was fairly common in 600 A.D. in the area that is now the frazione of Casanova, and then it spread to the larger area around Carmagnola, and finally to the historical region of Canavese, which reportedly derives its name from the plant. In fact, the importance of cannabis cultivation in said region is attested by the fact that on weapons, on shields, on imprese, on charters, and on the blazons of the first counts, the tender little plant appeared as a symbol almost attesting their origin to be as one with that of the region; while the comuni of Barone Canavese, Borgomasino, and Prascorsano still show a hemp plant in their coats of arms.

In any case, the cultivation of hemp spread to the entire Padan plain during the Middle Ages, in particular during the 11th century, while a major boost to the production of hemp in Carmagnola was given by the foundation of the Abbey of Santa Maria di Casanova, between 1127 and 1150, after a land donation made by the Marquis of Saluzzo to the Cistercians. Several documents from the 12th and 13th centuries attest the cultivation and processing of hemp in the area, in particular with the monks working on expanding and improving their crops, which grew to cover several hectares. The extent of the cultivations was such that a grangian monk was specifically appointed to direct the work on the fields, and he needed to be dispensed from performing any other cloistered duty. In addition, specific provisions were issued by Thomas II of Savoy during the 13th century, which promoted the spread of hemp cultivation in the region; and by the 14th century, hemp fields in Piedmont covered a large area between the comuni of Cavour, Cercenasco, La Loggia, Moretta, and Racconigi. Furthermore, Carmagnola became an important trading center for hemp fiber and seeds under the Marquisate of Saluzzo, so much so that in 1300 its hemp was subjected to both civil taxes and ecclesiastical tithes; and by the second half of the 16th century it was the main center for all of Piedmont. In particular, the Carmagnola hemp variety was exported to the rest of the Italian states, as well as to France, and the town itself acquired over the centuries the title of Empire of Hemp.

=== Hemp textile production ===
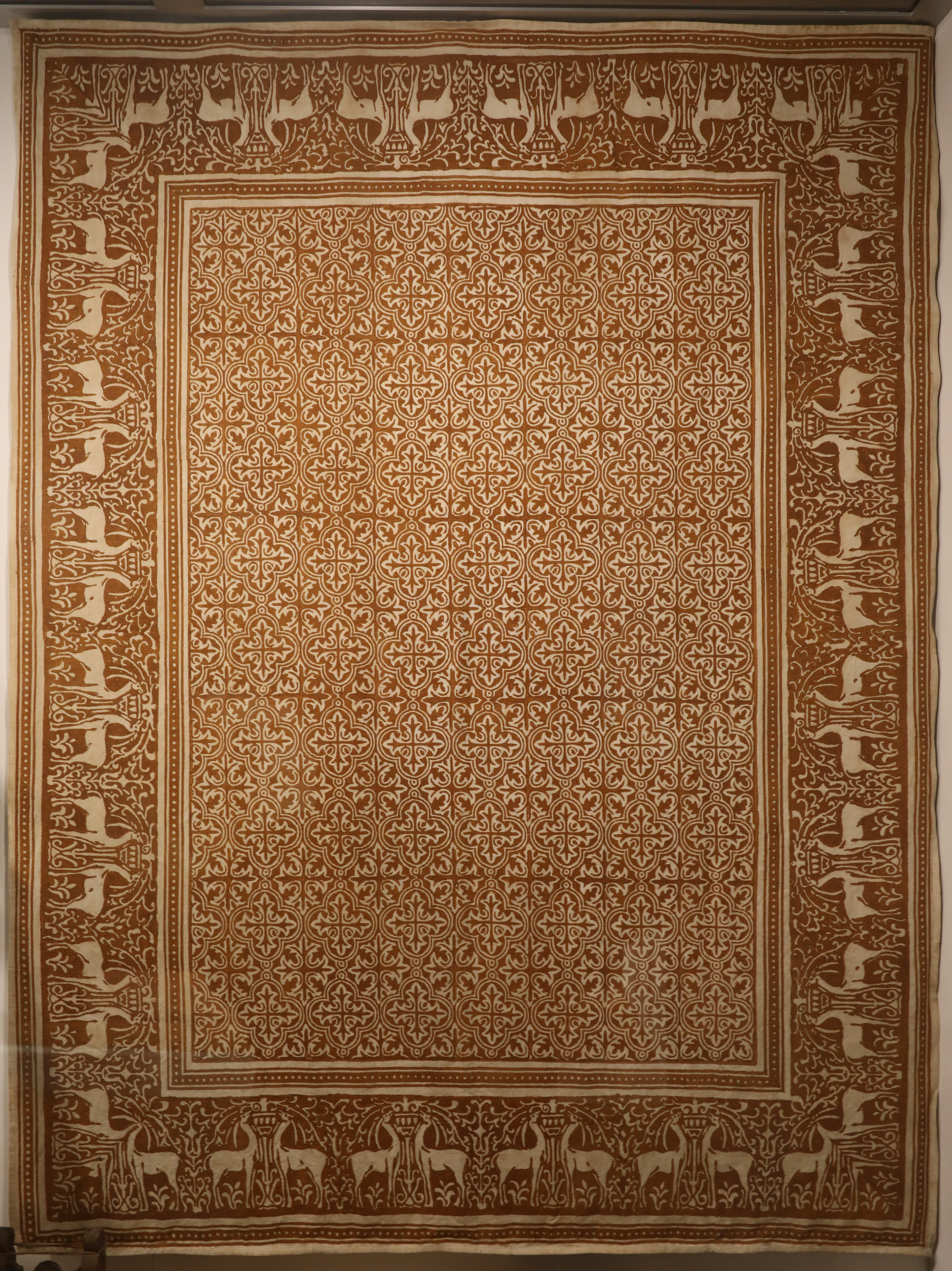
Stamp-decorated hemp tablecloth from Umbria, made before 1956.

Tutti siamo figli di Adamo e Eva, ma chi veste di canapa e chi di seta.
Note. Proverb on economic inequality, meaning We are all children of Adam and Eve, but some dress in hemp and some in silk.

The processing of hemp textiles in the area around Biella dates back to at least the 13th century, with the City Statues from 1245 providing instructions on how to determine the price of woven hemp cloths. Indeed, even though Biella later became a major center for wool textiles, hemp is believed to have been more widely processed in the area at the time, with the 1245 statutes mentioning hemp before they mention wool. The cultivation of hemp in the area was not extensive, but rather spread among mostly small family-owned fields, with the sowing occurring in April and the first harvest occurring in August, when the male hemp plants reached around 2 m (6.6 ft) in height. The harvested hemp stalks were then macerated either in running water (e.g., natural streams or irrigation canals), in dedicated tanks of stagnant water, or at the shore of lakes (e.g., the lake of Viverone), with the maceration lasting around 1–3 weeks depending on the weather. The development of hemp cultivation and processing remained steady up until the beginning of the 17th century, when cotton became more widely traded due to its cheaper price, especially among small businesses, which subsequently led to the spread of several types of mixed hemp-cotton textiles.

As early as the 17th century, the Piedmontese government was interested in developing the manufacture of fine linen and hemp textiles from a mercantilist perspective, especially considering the periodic crises in the manufacture of silk and wool. As a result, the linen and hemp sectors benefited from new public investment during the second half of the 18th century, as well as from the involvement of the noble class, with two different models being attempted. The ultimately unsuccessful concentrated model was based on the idea of manufacturing as a concentration of people and capital, however it was negatively impacted by technical difficulties, as well as by the significant length, complexity, and increasing costs of hemp processing, compared to cotton. Conversely, the domestic model promoted the training of skilled workers who would integrate the production of clothes at home with other agricultural activities, thus resulting in a diversified production that would reduce the impact of periodic crises and balance the risks without requiring a significant investment. In the second half of the 18th century, the development of the textile industry and the subsequent increase in the demand, led to the establishment of several hemp processing centers, known as piste, in the comuni of Crocemosso, Trivero, Coggiola, Pray, Lessona, Crosa, Cossato, Sala, Mongrando, Tollegno, and Pralungo.

In the first half of the 19th century, the domestic system managed to remain competitive thanks to the introduction of an improved domestic spinning machine in 1828, while the other fibers (i.e., cotton, wool, and silk) were no longer compatible with certain forms of rural processing, as factory mechanisation progressed. In 1845, hemp production in Piedmont amounted to almost 10,000 t, of which two thirds were used by the textile industry and one third were used for rope production. Nevertheless, the significant emigration during the late 19th – early 20th century negatively affected the labor-intensive hemp production, while the transition to a more centralized system also impacted the rural sector. In addition, the introduction of mechanical spinning further impacted the artisanal production, leading to a debate between the supporters of progress and those who highlighted the negative impact of modernization on rural communities and especially on local women, who earned a significant salary from spinning and weaving activities. Later in the 20th century, the combination of urbanization, the appeal of factory jobs for the working class, and competition from both cheaper cotton textiles and foreign hemp tows, further incentivized the remaining local farmers to switch from hemp to other more profitable crops.

=== Hemp rope production ===
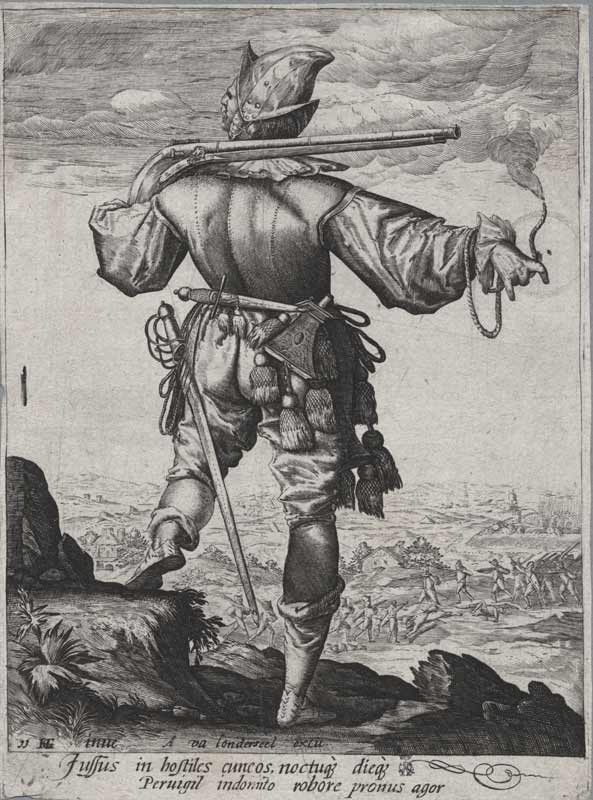
Engraving depicting an arquebusier in the service of Emperor Rudolf II, around 1600, with a piece of ignited rope in his hand, which predated the widespread use of matchlocks.

Se il fil di canapa è marcio, non s'avrà mai corda buona.
Note. Excerpt written by Piedmontese-Italian statesman Massimo d'Azeglio meaning If the hemp thread is rotten, you will never have a good rope, as part of a larger statement on the need to improve the individual to build a better nation.

In the 15th century, the main use of the hemp fiber produced in Carmagnola was in warfare, and it was mainly acquired by the Marquisate of Saluzzo, the Duchy of Savoy, the Republic of Genoa, as well as the French army. After its annexation by the Savoyard state under Duke Charles Emmanuel I of Savoy in 1588, Carmagnola became an important center for the production of hemp ropes, although this was mainly driven by artisan family businesses, while the main product being traded in the region was still the raw fiber, with significant purchases being made by Spanish, French, and Genoese merchants. Even though the rope production in Carmagnola never quite had an industrial nature, a rope factory was established in the town in 1617, to produce stocks of strings for the matchlocks used in arquebuses, as well as to supply hemp ropes to the Royal Sardinian Army and Navy. Despite a temporary interruption due to the plague of 1630, the production of ropes in Carmagnola significantly increased during the 17th century, as did their exportation, particularly to France; and by the 18th century, nine of the twenty provinces of the Kingdom of Piedmont–Sardinia produced a surplus of hemp.

In Carmagnola, each ropemaker was specialized in the production of a particular kind of rope, whose length could range between 50 m (160 ft) and 150 m (490 ft), depending on the length of the senté (i.e., ropewalks). According to a population census taken in 1665, 18 families of ropemakers could be found in the town, spread among its various frazioni, while 19 families were recorded in a 1734 census. The reputation of the locally produced ropes was such that, reportedly, they were even supplied to Napoleon during his Italian campaign of 1796–1797. However, around the end of the 18th century, the number of ropemakers decreased due to some families emigrating to the territories on the other side of the Alps, where they taught their trade to the local artisans. Nevertheless, the hemp-related activities in Carmagnola reached their peak during the 19th century, with a total of 30 rope factories, which by that time were all concentrated in the frazione of San Bernardo. Moreover, among the 80 factories and workshops that could be found in Carmagnola in 1882, (Note: The date reported in the cited documentary is 1822, however precedence is given to the date reported by the Comune of Carmagnola. The reported numbers could very well have remained the same, unless an error was made.) 66 were connected in one way or another to the processing of hemp, including 5 ropeyards, which employed generally underpaid workers. In 1886, several ropemakers even founded a mutual aid society, as well as a religious society, for which Saint Bartholomew the Apostle was chosen as the protector, since his life and martyrdom were seen as reminiscent of the maceration of hemp stalks.

After the Italian Unification of 1861, in particular with the annexation of Veneto and Friuli, then parts of the Kingdom of Lombardy–Venetia, by the Kingdom of Italy after the Third Italian War of Independence of 1866, the demand for ropes produced in Carmagnola decreased, while profits made from exports were limited by tariffs. Nevertheless, Carmagnola remained the primary center for the production of hemp seeds, which became the main source of revenue for the local economy between 1875 and 1889. However, the cultivation of hemp in Carmagnola started to decline at the beginning of the 20th century, due to a reduction in the price of bast fibre, with the crisis deepening between 1925 and 1935, and the main hemp market closing down in 1939. In 1936, the number of rope factories in the town decreased to 7, although their number increased to 11 with Italy entering World War II in 1940, and they supplied the Ministry of War, the Ministry of Communication, the State Railways, the Artillery Directorate, the arsenals of La Spezia Naval Base and others. In any case, the centuries-old activity of Carmagnola eventually came to an end around the mid-1960s, mainly due to the introduction of cheaper synthetic fibers, although its legacy is still attested in the remains of the old markets, maceration sites, and ropeyards. In particular, the last one remaining of the 40 historical tettoie (i.e., canopies), that were once used as ropewalks, has been turned into the Hemp Museum of Carmagnola, and it includes several traditional tools that are still occasionally being used for reenactments by the local Historical Society of the Ropemakers.

== International use of Italian hemp ==
=== Italian hemp in the United Kingdom ===
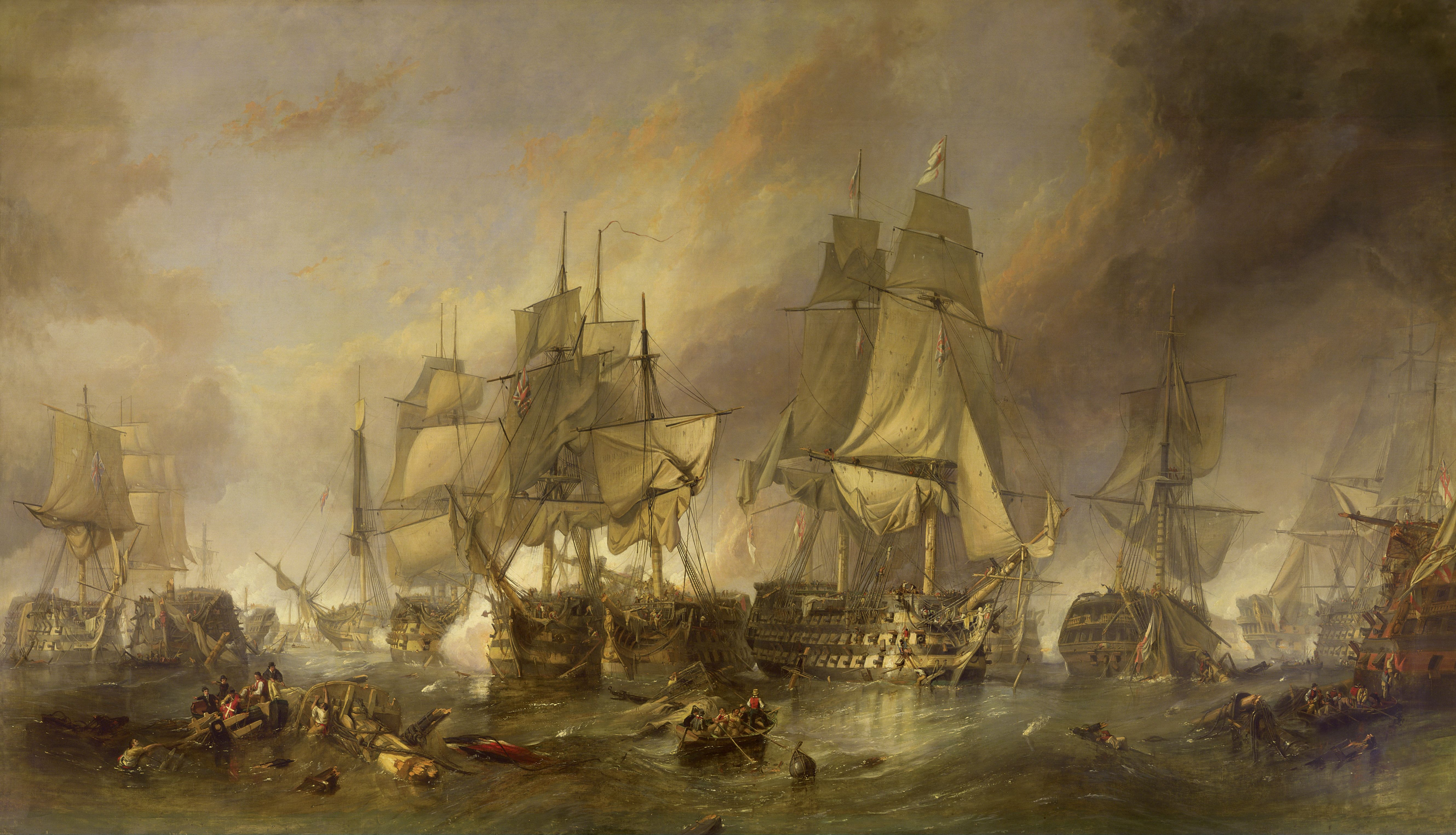
Painting from 1836 depicting a moment of the Battle of Trafalgar of 21 October 1805, by Clarkson Frederick Stanfield. In the foreground, HMS Victory is engaging the dismasted Redoutable. The latter is also flanked by HMS Temeraire, which is firing her broadside at the approaching Fougueux.

When hemp is spun, England is done. (Note: This proverb evolved from an earlier anti-monarchist (or possibly anti-protestant) slogan, dating back to the Anglican Reformation of the 16th century. First reported by Francis Bacon as a triuiall prophecie, the slogan stated When Hempe is sponne, England's done, with Hempe being an acronym for the last five monarchs of the then-reigning House of Tudor.)
Note. Old English proverb on England's historical heavy reliance on hemp for its naval strength.

The reputation of Italian hemp well preceded the unification of the country in 1861; namely, its higher quality, durability, and strength had already been noted during its first introduction into the United Kingdom in the 1820s, where it was initially used for the production of fishing nets, despite its higher price. At the time, Italian farmers were said to sow hemp on their best lands, which are rich, strong loams, on which they are at all possible pains to procure a fine friable surface, while using for manure a mixture of dung, pieces of rotten cloth, feathers, and horns, brought from Dalmatia. However, hemp could still be cultivated in all kinds of soil, resulting in fibers of different qualities; in particular, poor lands would produce finer fibers, although in smaller quantities, whereas rich lands would produce coarser fibers in greater quantities, and the latter was the one required for the manufacture of cables, hawsers, and other heavy rigging.

As an example of the quality of the hemp produced in Italy, a smack-owner from Barking, Essex, who combined Russian and Italian twines for his fishing net, reported that the Russian hemp portion had to be renewed with the same material several times before the Italian hemp portion was worn out. Moreover, tensile tests performed at the Chatham Dockyard in January 1855 found the strength of Italian hemp to be nearly one-fourth higher than that of Russian hemp. For instance, ropes made from Italian hemp only broke at a strain of 5 long tons (11,200 lb; 5,080 kg) and several cwt, while Russian hemp ropes with the same number of strands broke at 3 long tons and 3 cwt (7,056 lb; 3,201 kg), and Irish hemp ropes broke at 3 long tons (6,720 lb; 3,048 kg). Furthermore, following a Navy Board inspection of the Chatham and Portsmouth ropeyards on 4 November 1823, a more extended use of Italian hemp was recommended, particularly for lines and twines, to counter the monopoly that Russia held in the country at the time, while it was reckoned that the higher cost of the fiber would be recouped by its longer duration.

According to contemporary estimates, the sails and cordage of a first-rate man-of-war required 180,000 lb (82,000 kg) of raw hemp for their manufacturing, while the land required to produce just 1 long ton (2,240 lb; 1,016 kg) of hemp averaged at 5 acres (0.02 km^{2}), which meant that a single large ship could require the yearly hemp production from as much as 424 acres (1.72 km^{2}) of farm land, to furnish its necessary tackle. Therefore, it was reckoned that Great Britain could not provide for the immense demand from both the Royal Navy and the Merchant Navy by relying solely on its own production, hence the need for imports. In fact, even though at the time industrial hemp was cultivated in various parts of France, Spain, Holland, Denmark, Sweden, and in several of the Italian states; none of these countries, with the exception of a trifling export from Italy, produced it in enough quantities to satisfy their respective internal demands, while Russia was considered to be the grand mart for hemp as an article of commerce. Furthermore, as an example of the resources needed just for the rigging of a navy ship, a total of 34 mi (55 km) of Italian hemp rope, 3 long tons (6,720 lb; 3,048 kg) of spun yarn, 300 yd (274 m) of canvas, and over 200 imp gal (909 L) of tar were used in 1964 for the re-rigging of HMS Victory.

The strategic importance of ensuring the steady supply of raw hemp became even more evident during the Crimean War of 1853–1856, which prompted a discussion on possible alternative suppliers of fibers among the British colonies and dominions, such as the Cape Colony and British India. As an indication of this urgency, it was reported during a Parliamentary debate on 20 February 1855, that the First Lord of the Admiralty had lately supplied himself with an enormous quantity of hemp from Italy, equal to about 5,000 long tons (5,080 t), which was nearly three years' average consumption in time of peace in the dockyards. As a reference, the Italian hemp was selling at £70 per long ton in the London market in the 1850s, which was more than double the price for the best Russian hemp, and would roughly correspond to £8,800 (€10,000; 11,200 US$) per long ton in 2019. Subsequently, the potential introduction of both Italian hemp and rhea into the Indian subcontinent, together with proper processing machinery, was later proposed as a way for the United Kingdom to become independent from the rest of the world in terms of supplies.

==== Gallows hemp rope ====
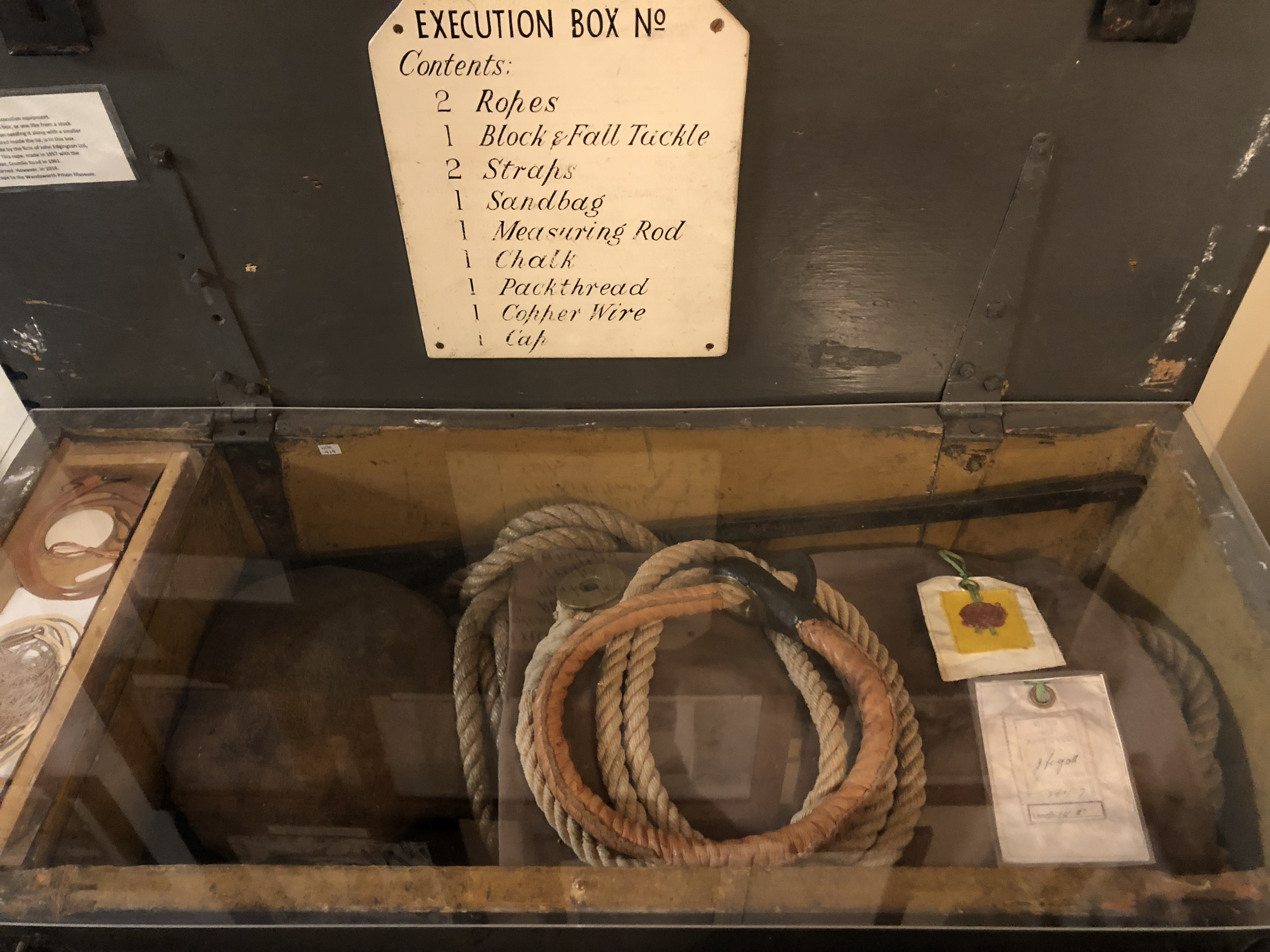
Execution Box containing all the equipment needed by a British executioner, on display at the Wandsworth Prison museum.

La canapa sta meglio addosso che intorno al collo.
Note. Cautionary proverb regarding capital offences, meaning Hemp looks better on you than around your neck.

On 30 January 1886, a Committee chaired by Lord Aberdare was appointed to investigate the causes of a series of botched executions and to make recommendations for improving the existing execution practices. The final report on the most effective method of hanging eventually led to the Official Table of Drops, a manual issued by the Home Office for calculating the appropriate length of the gallows rope, based on the weight of the prisoner, to ensure an instant and painless death in long drops. In regard to the types of rope used, it was customary for executioners to provide those of their own choosing and there were no rules for testing them. As an example, after testing several varieties, contemporary English executioner James Berry selected 13 ft (3.96 m) long, 0.75 in (1.91 cm) thick ropes made of the finest Italian hemp and obtained by twisting five strands, each of which had a breaking strain of 1 long ton (2,240 lb; 1,016 kg) dead weight. The durability of these ropes was such that he was able to use one for sixteen executions and five others for twelve executions each, and these particular ropes later came in the possession of Madame Tussaud.

In any case, following a botched execution in Yorkshire in 1878 in which the rope broke, the Secretary of State Richard Assheton Cross ordered an inquiry and directed that a pattern rope should be made of a rope such as might be safely used for executions. Following rigorous tests, the Secretary eventually approved the use of a 12 ft 6 in (3.81 m) long, 0.8 in (2.03 cm) thick standard rope made of white Italian hemp and obtained by twisting four strands, each having fifteen threads, while a brass thimble was laid in at the lower end of the rope. Moreover, a stock of such ropes was ordered to be kept at Newgate in order to be readily available when needed by the sheriffs, and no failure in terms of strength had been recorded when these ropes were used. The use of Italian hemp ropes for executions was also common in Ireland and continued well after the independence of the country in 1921, including for the hanging of murderer Michael Manning on 20 April 1954 at Mountjoy Prison in Dublin, the last person to be executed in the country.

Elsewhere in the world, one of the main suppliers for gallows ropes across the United States during the second half of the 19th century was the Edwin H. Fitler cordage manufacturing business in the Bridesburg neighborhood of Philadelphia, PA; and employee Godfrey Boger in particular was specialized in their production for the company from 1854 onwards. These ropes required hemp of the finest quality, with the raw material being imported from Italy; and their quality is attested in the fact that only one of Boger's ropes ever broke.

=== Italian hemp and oceanography ===
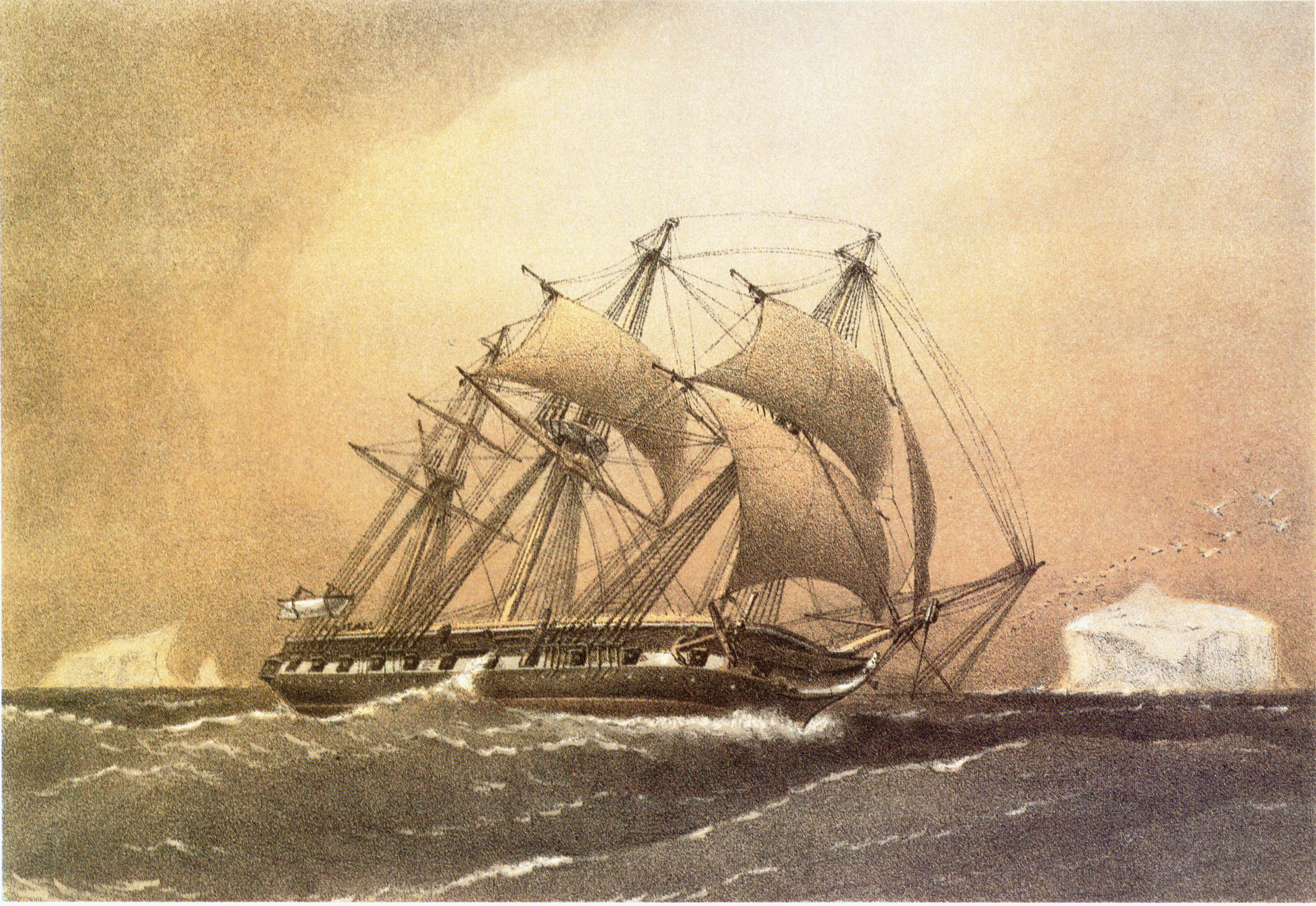
Painting by William Frederick Mitchell depicting HMS Challenger in polar seas in 1872.

Ye hae a streak o' carl hemp in you.
Note. Old common Scottish saying denoting firmness of mind, with carl-hemp being the largest stalk of female hemp plants.

Hemp fiber produced in Italy has also been used for several geographical surveys and scientific explorations, such as the sounding of the deep sea bed off the coast of Ireland by HMS Porcupine in 1869; and the Challenger expedition of 1872–1876, in which HMS Challenger carried 181 mi (291 km) of Italian hemp rope that was used for measuring the depths of the ocean through plummets, as well as lowering dredges to sample the sea floor. Even though the sounding lines were usually well hackled and rubbed down, to prevent any ragged parts from projecting outward and thus increasing the friction of the cordage during its descent, the submerged ropes would have still been increasingly slowed down the more they descended by the air bubbles trapped in their interstices, thus significantly distorting the measurements at great depths.

In the case of HMS Challenger, the stowed Italian hemp ropes were each made at a length of about 120 fathoms (240.0 yd; 219.5 m), while a number of them had been spliced together to form a single 3,000 fathoms (3.4 mi; 5.5 km) long line, which was marked every 25 fathoms (50.0 yd; 45.7 m). Most notably, after running out of rope during the first reading, the expedition unexpectedly measured on 23 March 1875 a depth of 4,475 fathoms (5.1 mi; 8.2 km) near Guam, in the Ladrones Islands, not far from what would later become known as the Challenger Deep, at the southern end of the Mariana Trench. Furthermore, the reading marked the first time that a depth over 4,000 fathoms (4.5 mi; 7.3 km) was ever recorded, with the line taking about one hour to run out, although we had four hundredweight on the end, and about two hours to reel in. In any case, since the weights attached to the hemp lines were too heavy for the limited steam power available on board, which was mainly used either to power the dredging platform or to keep the ship from drifting during depth soundings, such plummets were slipped and left at the bottom of the sea after each measurement.

At the same time, the SMS Gazelle was sent by the Imperial German Navy in 1874 on a two-year voyage, charged with carrying to the Kerguelen Islands one of the several German scientific expeditions that were sent to different sites around the world, to observe the transit of Venus on 9 December 1874; as well as with promoting oceanography and conducting physical and oceanographic research in the maritime sciences. For the latter purpose, the ship used 1 in (2.54 cm) thick, three-strand cable lay, (Note: Cable lay refers to the lay length, which is the distance required by a twisted strand to complete one revolution around the diameter of the rope.) sounding lines that were produced by the Chatham shipyard by twisting 27 yarns of Italian hemp, for a total length of 10,000 fathoms (11.4 mi; 18.3 km). Despite having an estimated breaking load of 792 kg (1,746 lb) when dry and 702 kg (1,548 lb) when wet, these lines never broke during the voyage and they were used exclusively for deep-sea explorations.

==== Further applications ====
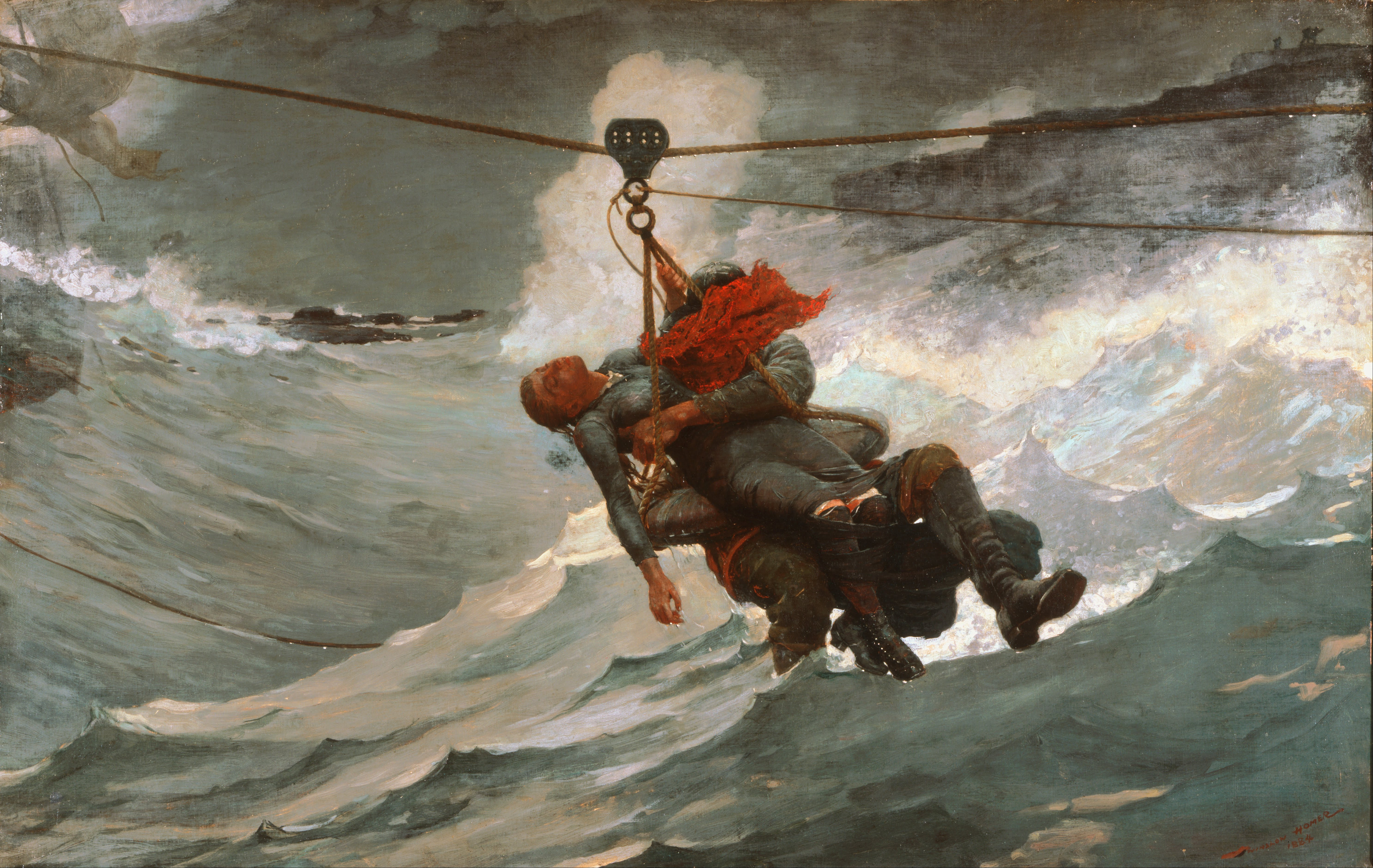
Painting by Winslow Homer depicting the rescue of a passenger from a stricken ship in 1884.

In addition to depth sounding, another notable use of Italian hemp ropes on the high seas was in whale hunting, whereby for instance a 5 in (12.7 cm) thick line would be fastened to a 76 in (1.93 m) long and 110 lb (49.9 kg) heavy iron harpoon, while around 50 fathoms (100.0 yd; 91.4 m) of a somewhat smaller line would be coiled under the harpoon gun. This latter forerunner line provided slack to be carried with the harpoon as it flew through the air, and the rope continued below deck through a double winch at the bow of the whaling ship, for a total length of over 1,000 fathoms (1.1 mi; 1.8 km). The harpoon lines were made of the finest Italian hemp, and they were tested for a breaking point of 18 long tons (40,320 lb; 18,289 kg), while the forerunner line was tested for at most 16 long tons (35,840 lb; 16,257 kg), although those made especially for hunting blue whales would be able to resist a strain of 28 long tons (62,720 lb; 28,449 kg). In any case, if the line was kept tight and there were no sudden jerks, then the ropes would seldom break.

During the 1860s, Italian hemp ropes were also used in maritime rescue operations, specifically as part of rocket-based line thrower systems such as the Boxer rocket, a two-staged gunpowder-charged projectile developed by British colonel Edward Mounier Boxer in 1865. In accordance with the rescue process and apparatus recommended at the time by HM Coastguard, and also used by the Board of Trade, the released 500 yd (457.2 m) long, 1 in (2.54 cm) thick, and 46 lb (20.9 kg) heavy, Italian hemp line was the first of a series of increasingly stronger lines that were sent from the shore to the shipwreck, and it also carried a tally board with instructions for the survivors in four different languages on how to proceed. To their end of the rocket line, the rescue crew fastened a heavier endless line, known as a whip, with a tail block attached. Once secured to the mast of the wreck, the whip carried out a hawser to which a breeches buoy was attached, in order to bring the survivors to shore one by one.

=== Italian hemp and mountaineering ===
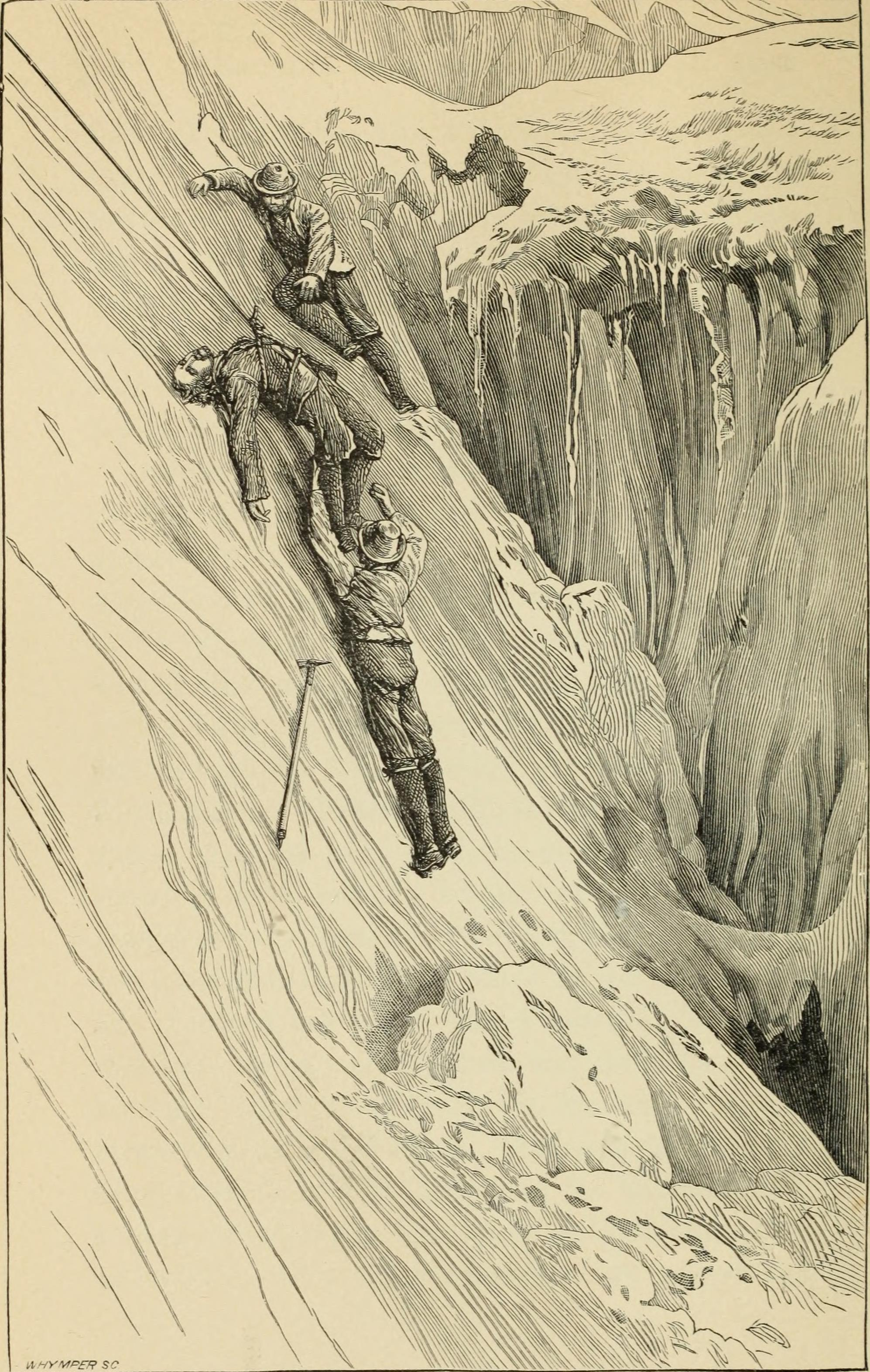
Illustration depicting the rescue of a porter from a crevasse in an Alpine glacier in 1896.

Disse la canapa al lino: tu ti rompi e io m'affino.
Note. Proverb on the durability of hemp, meaning Said the hemp to the flax: you break and I sharpen up.

During the golden age of alpinism, the strength of Italian hemp was also noticed in the context of the development of protection systems for rock climbing and mountaineering. Also known as canaponi, hemp ropes in the mountain regions were not initially meant for climbing, considering their overall weight (especially when wet) and rigidity, but rather they were used by shepherds to tie their animals. In any case, the first hemp climbing ropes were used without harnesses during both ascent and descent, while the belaying consisted of simply passing the rope around the body, with appropriate vests being used to reduce both rubbing-related pain and clothes creasing.

In 1864, a special committee of the Alpine Club approved the use of ropes made from Manila hemp, Italian hemp, and flax for mountaineering purposes. The aim of the committee was to determine what is the strongest kind of rope which is light enough to be carried about, considering that the alpine traveller's rope, if tried at all, will have to resist a sudden jerk, which may be a very violent one. In particular, dedicated tests showed that no plaited rope could stand a 12 st (168.0 lb; 76.2 kg) person falling for 5 ft (1.5 m), and only four types of rope would take it. Subsequently, the committee increased the required minimum tensile strength to being able to endure both a 12 st (168.0 lb; 76.2 kg) person falling for 10 ft (3.0 m), and a 14 st (196.0 lb; 88.9 kg) person falling for 8 ft (2.4 m), which reduced the acceptable rope types to the aforementioned final three. However, none of them could stand a 14 st (196.0 lb; 88.9 kg) person falling for 10 ft (3.0 m), and they tended to break at a dead weight of 2 long tons (4,480 lb; 2,032 kg).

In terms of their weight, the three approved types of rope were considered to be the heaviest ropes that could still be conveniently carried about in the Alps, with the Italian hemp rope weighting 4.5 lb (2.0 kg) per 100 ft (30.5 m), while both the Manila hemp and flax ropes weighted 4.6 lb (2.1 kg) per 100 ft (30.5 m). In regard to their extensibility, no rope with a potential extension lower than 12.5% was considered fit for use in mountaineering, and most Manila ropes were found to extend between 15% and 16% when dry, while the Italian hemp ropes extended somewhat less. Finally, among the identified advantages in using Italian hemp, the committee found that the rope was both harder and less bulky with respect to the other two, and therefore it was reckoned that it would probably wear best, while being the least likely to cut against rocks. On the other hand, among the disadvantages, it was also found that Italian hemp ropes were much more stiff and difficult to untie than the others, and that they were very difficult to handle when wet, as they tended to kink. Nevertheless, any kind of waterproofing was reported to be highly damaging to both hemp and flax; moreover, every knot tied along the ropes was found to cumulatively weaken them and thus constituted a potential breaking point, so much so that none of the approved ropes types could pass the second one of the two previously mentioned tensile tests, if they presented a knot.

A notable example of the use of Italian hemp ropes in mountaineering is the first technical climb of the Devils Tower in Wyoming in 1937, led by the German American pioneer of free climbing Fritz Wiessner, during which each climber carried a 35 m (115 ft) long safety rope made of the best quality Italian hemp. The ropes were tested using weights up to 1.5 t (3,307 lb; 1,500 kg), and they were estimated to stretch between 20 ft (6 m) and 25 ft (8 m), which would correspond to an extension between 17.1% and 22.9%, thus acting as a cushion to the climbers in case of a fall. Italian hemp ropes were also used during Wiessner's ill-fated American Karakoram expedition of 1939, which unsuccessfully attempted the first ascent to the then unclimbed summit of K2. Considered to be the best ones available at the time, even though they were only half as strong as the kernmantle ropes that would become available a few years later, the Italian hemp ropes still had the disadvantage of being water absorbent and proved to be totally unmanageable when wet and frozen. Another notable incident involving hemp ropes was during the first ascent of Monte Cervino, led by English mountaineer and author Edward Whymper on 14 July 1865, in what has been described as the first great tragedy of modern alpinism. In the widely reported incident, one of the climbers slipped during the descent, pulling down four others who were attached to the same line; and the latters only managed to survive because the hemp rope broke.

=== Italian hemp and aeronautics ===
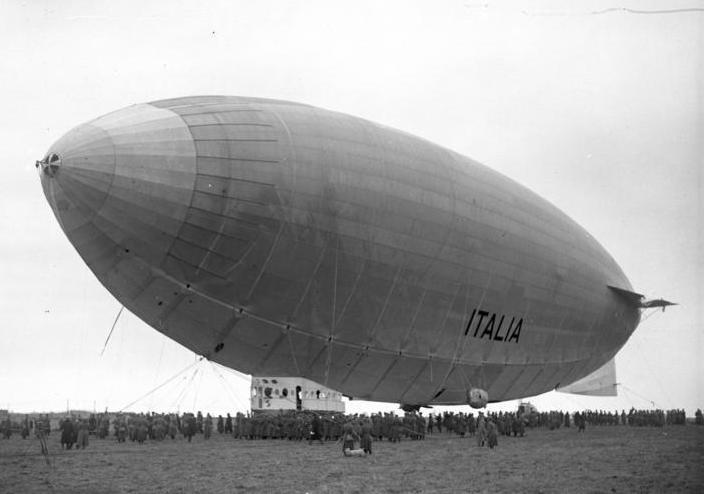
Royal Italian Air Force semi-rigid airship Italia in 1928.

A lump of hemp acts as a good hygrometer, and prognosticates rain when it is damp.
Note. Proverb on the sensitivity of hemp to dampness, which makes it a good material for hygrometers, with hemp strings forecasting rain by getting shorter, and dry weather by lengthening again.

In the early years of modern aeronautics, Italian hemp was one of the materials used to produce some of the rigging ropes used in free balloons, kite balloons, and airships, together with Manila hemp. In regard to their different qualities, American-made balloons mostly used Manila hemp ropes, which were hard-laid and could resist moisture to a certain extent. Conversely, Italian hemp ropes were loose-laid and soft in texture; they tended to fray out; and they adsorbed moisture freely, thus increasing the weight carried by the balloon, especially in damp, foggy, and rainy weather. Nevertheless, some of the rigging of kite balloons was made up from steel wire, while airships were almost completely rigged with wire cables, although either Manila or Italian hemp ropes could also be attached to sections of the handling lines by reeving through the eye in the lower ends of these parts.

In addition, mooring lines made of the best grade Manila or Italian hemp were used for anchoring balloons to the ground in windy weather. As an example, a mooring harness was fitted along the top of kite balloons, to which a total of sixteen drop forged steel rings were attached and used both to anchor the balloon and for bagging down. In particular, picket lines were fastened to these rings, namely seven ropes were attached on each side, one on the nose, and one at the tail of the balloon; and the ends of these lines were fitted with eyes for reeving the anchor lines through.

A notable example of the use of Italian hemp ropes in early aeronautics was during the ill-fated three-men Arctic balloon expedition of 1897, led by Swedish engineer and aeronaut Salomon August Andrée, which unsuccessfully attempted to reach the North Pole on board the polar balloon Örnen (i.e., The Eagle). The hydrogen balloon itself had a volume of 170,000 cu ft (4,814 m^{3}), while a total of 15 mi (24 km) of Italian hemp ropes made up the overlaid net, which supported the large gondola at the bottom through the 48 carrying lines that were attached to the carrying-ring. In addition, the net had been soaked in acid-free vaseline, to prevent it from absorbing water during the voyage.

== Kingdom of Italy ==
=== Medical use of cannabis ===
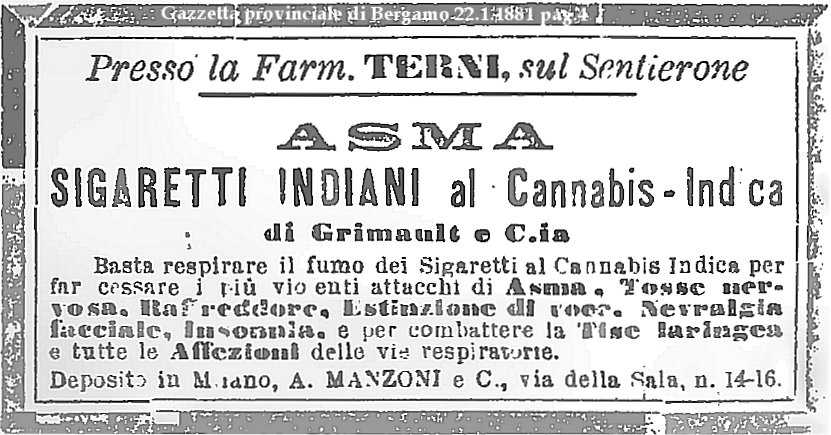
Advertisement for cannabis indica cigarettes in 1881.

Bergamo Provincial Gazette – January 22, 1881 – p. 4

At the TERNI Pharmacy in the Sentierone street – ASTHMA – Cannabis Indica INDIAN CIGARETTES – by Grimault & Co.

It is enough to breathe the smoke of the cannabis indica cigarettes to stop the most violent attacks of asthma, nervous cough, cold, extinction of voice, facial neuralgia, insomnia, and to combat laryngitis and all the ailments of the respiratory airways.

Stocks in Milan, A. Manzoni & Co., via della Sala, n. 14–16.

Note. English translation of the advert shown on the right, which inaccurately promotes cannabis cigarettes as a remedy for several ailments.

In the late modern period, the spread of the use of cannabis for recreational purposes in Europe is generally attributed to the return of French soldiers from Napoleon's military campaigns of 1798–1801 in Egypt, where the lack of alcohol prompted them to try hashish as an alternative. Nevertheless, the first scientific studies on the medical use of cannabis were carried out by Irish doctor William Brooke O'Shaughnessy in 1839, when he administered cannabis-based medicine to patients suffering from various diseases, ranging from epilepsy to rheumatism, and noticed an anticonvulsant, analgesic, and antiemetic efficacy. Most notably, the contemporary Italian review of Dr. O'Shaughnessy's major 1840 paper on Indian hemp, appears to be the first modern Italian writing on the subject and it also highlights a particular interest on the part of Italian doctors, considering that the 1840 Bengali journal article was only published on a London medical journal in 1843. Even though it cannot be excluded that cannabis indica could have occasionally been present in Italy during the ancient and medieval periods, its rarity is attested by the absence of any reference to the plant in the 12th–13th century poem Regimen sanitatis Salernitanum by the Schola Medica Salernitana. Instead, the first reference to its presence in Italy was made in 1845, while the first Italian experience with the plant was reported in 1847, with doctors having been the first to import dried flower buds and hashish, to then market them in pharmacies.

==== Experimentations with hashish ====
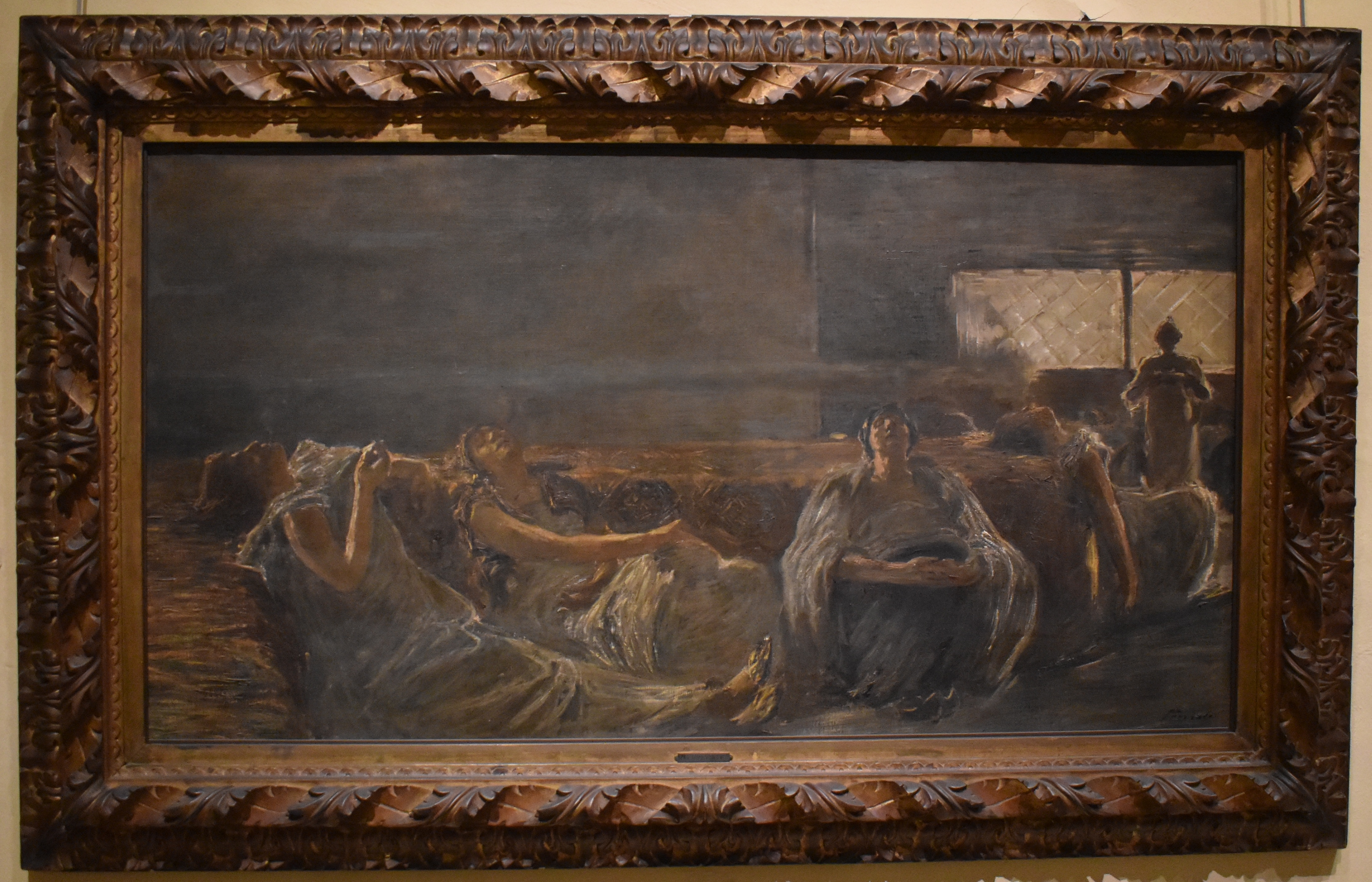
Painting by Gaetano Previati depicting women smoking either hashish or opium in 1887, in a typical contemporary representation of Orientalism.

On 26 January 1860, a Medical Commission delegated with the study of hydrophobia decided that, at the first possible case of canine rabies, the use of hashish would have been experimented as a potential remedy, by administering a dose able to develop energetic phenomena without endangering the life of the patient. On 12 May 1860, patient Gaetano De Ponti was admitted to the Ospedale Maggiore di Milano for a suspected case of hydrophobia, whose prodromes started to appear on 7 May following a dog bite he suffered on the previous 11 April. During the first 24 hours of hospitalization, 2.5 g (0.088 oz) of hashish were administered in four doses however, besides a milder delirium and an overall lack of aggressive behavior, the characteristic hydrophobic symptoms did not abate at all, and the patient died on 14 May. Similar unsuccessful results had been previously observed in two other rabies cases in 1849, in which both hashish grains and cannabis tinctures had been administered, both orally and by enema.

The use of hashish as a remedy for rabies had been suggested to the commission by Dr. Giovanni Polli, at the time a fellow at the Istituto Lombardo Accademia di Scienze e Lettere, who performed several experiments on the use of hashish, both on himself and on two of his colleagues. The violent symptoms he experienced were reminiscent of the pathognomonic symptoms of hydrophobia, and therefore he postulated that such action on the nervous system in general, and the cerebral nerves in particular, could potentially constitute a possible counteract to the development of the disease. Earlier studies by Dr. Polli, dating back to 1849, further focused on the use of hashish in pharmaceutical formulations, while other proposed applications of the drug included the treatment of cholera, lypemania, as well as various nervous diseases.

==== Experimentations with cannabis indica ====
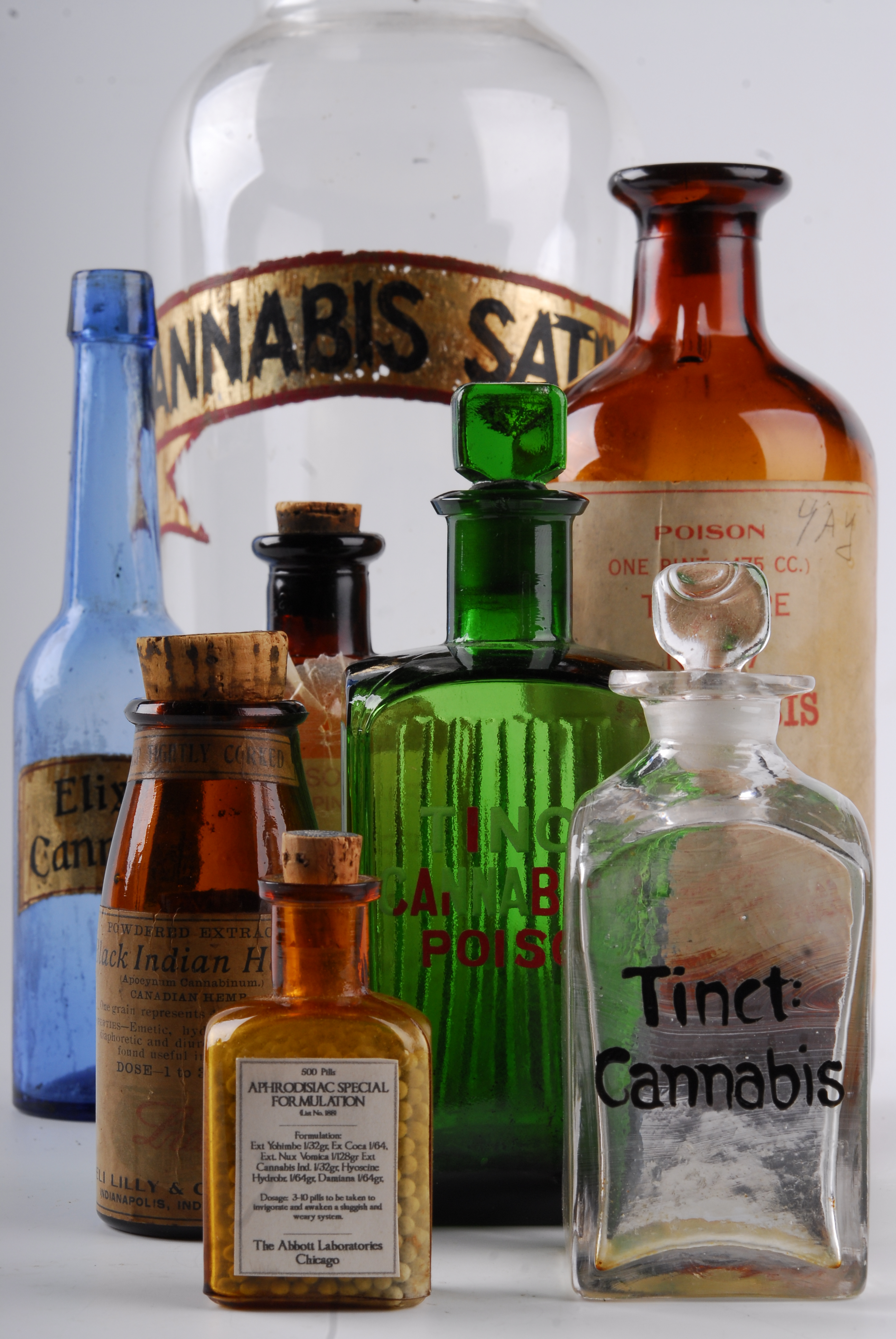
Medicine bottles from the 19th century on display at the Hash, Marihuana & Hemp Museum in Amsterdam, the Netherlands.

Similarly to Dr. O'Shaughnessy, some of the earliest attempts to treat patients with cannabis indica in Italy were made in 1887 by Dr. Raffaele Valieri, the then chief physician at the Hospital for the Incurables in Naples, which was dedicated to the treatment of patients in conditions of extreme poverty. In particular, the hospital operated in the context of four major outbreaks of cholera, which ravaged the city in 1855, in 1866, in 1873, and in 1884, causing thousands of deaths due to the severe overcrowding of the poorer neighborhoods combined with an underdeveloped sewage system, and thus prompted several major redevelopment projects in 1885. In any case, Dr. Valieri spent years experimenting with the medical use of cannabis for treating nervous conditions both on patients and on himself, testing different administration methods, while also taking notes on both positive and adverse effects.

As an example, while visiting the hemp-producing center of Casoria during the flowering period, Dr. Valieri personally tested and documented the effects of the released pollen after receiving reports that local farmers could not rest in the vicinity of the blooming hemp plants, or even sleep in farmhouses located in the middle of the fields. According to these reports, the farmers would experience heavy-headedness, somnolence accompanied by hallucinations and weird dreams, as well as an increasingly talkative, unruly, and brawling-prone behavior, in otherwise placid individuals. In other experiments, Dr. Valieri tested several administration methods including mastication, smoking pipes and cigarettes, decoctions and infuses, liquors, distilled water, pills, pearls, essential oils, tinctures and extracts. According to his findings, medical cannabis proved to be helpful in the treatment of hysteria, asthma, pulmonary emphysema, migraine, exophthalmic goiter, facial hyperkinesia, as well as other neuroses originating from both the central and peripheral nervous systems, neuralgia of the peripheral nerves, the trigeminal nerves, the occipital cervical plexus, the brachial plexus, the lumbar plexus, and the sacral plexus.

Based on the observed beneficial properties of medical cannabis, and considering its popularity especially among patients with asthma, Dr. Valieri started lobbying the Health authorities so that they would reduce the cost of cannabis, to make it more affordable for patients. Furthermore, the doctor campaigned for the establishment of an inhalation room in all of the Local Health Agencies, similar to the one he established in his hospital, in which patients could inhale the air-filling smoke produced by the combustion of cannabis. The main setback for the spread of medical cannabis in Italy was that, while by the end of the 19th century its use in clinical practice was well established in several parts of the world, the popular Indian variety was difficult to find in the Italian market. In fact, the first experiences and studies in Italy regarding the cultivation of cannabis indica plants only took place in 1931 at the Experimental Facility for Medicinal Plants in Naples, under the direction of botanist Biagio Longo, the then prefect of the Botanical Garden of Naples. Therefore, given the general unavailability of cannabis indica at the time of his studies, Dr. Valieri tested the medical properties of several Italian varieties found in Casoria noting that, while the effects were the same as the ones experienced with cannabis indica, they required a doubling of the previously prescribed dose. Nevertheless, the medical use of cannabis suffered a significant global decline during the 20th century due to several factors, including the introduction of more effective treatments for various ailments; its pharmacological instability, derived by the fact that the active principle (THC) had not yet been isolated, and therefore its effects were difficult to predict and standardize; and the economic costs associated with importing the medicine from abroad, especially in the context of two world wars.

==== Hemp fever ====
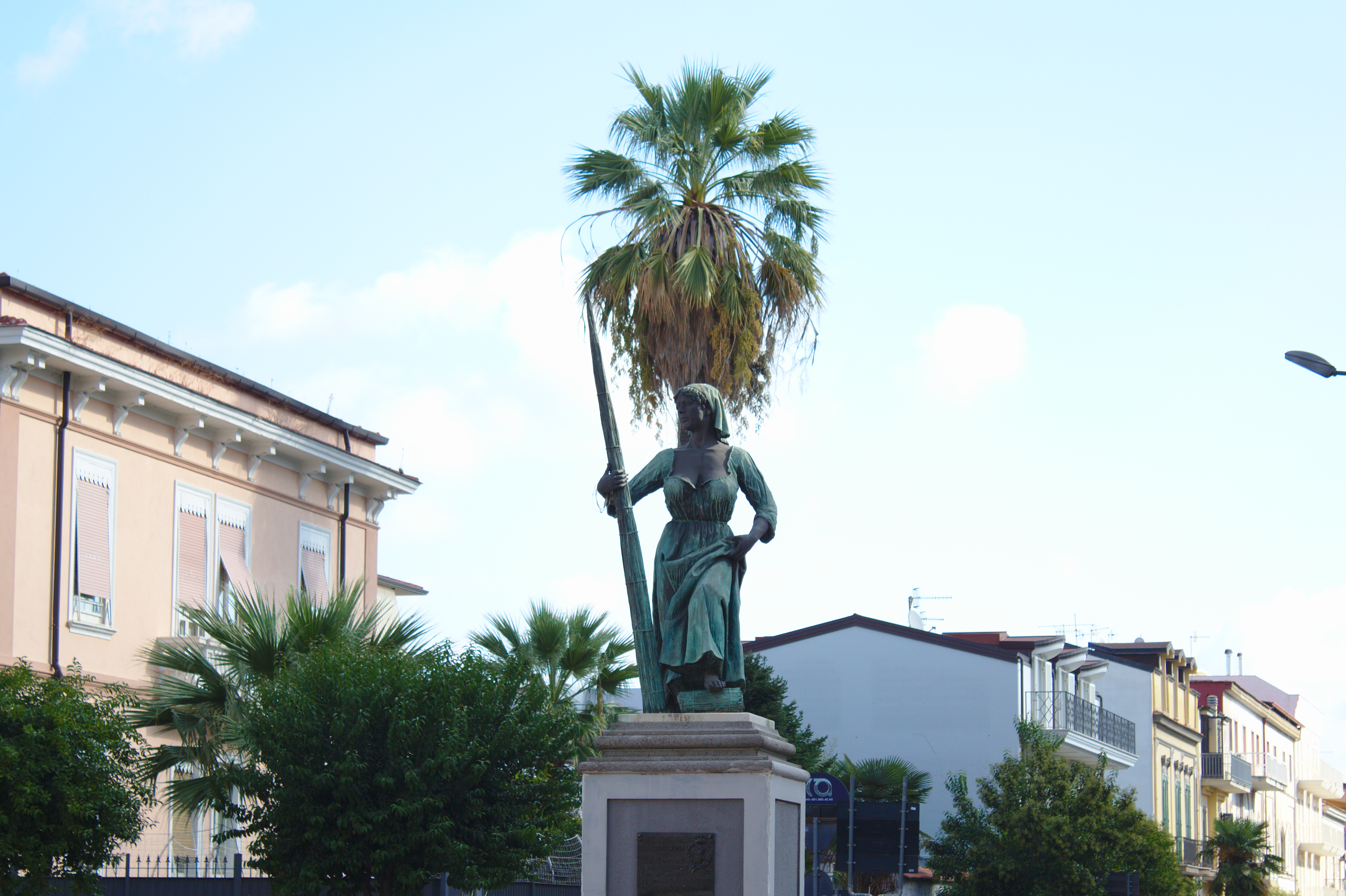
Statue depicting the canapina, a woman holding a bundle of hemp stalks, in Frattamaggiore.

Similarly to the reports heard by Dr. Valieri regarding the hemp fields in Casoria, the Medical-Surgical Society of Bologna was notified of a comparable condition, initially designated as summer fever due to its periodical occurrence, that affected especially young people and outdoor workers in the late 1800s. Lasting a few days, the symptoms included lack of appetite, headache, fatigue, skin rashes, fleeting joint and muscle pain, and occasionally mild epistaxis and diarrhea; and all these could be aggravated by the accompanied sudden increase in body temperature, sometimes surpassing 40 °C (104 °F), at the end of which the fever spontaneously remissed. Even though the condition itself was not severe overall, it regularly affected hundreds of people in the territory of Bologna alone, including a reported 12,000 military personnel over a decade from the local garrison, which at the time averaged 4,000 soldiers in the summer.

A connection between the observed summer fever and the seasonal hemp pollen was proposed by medical captain Dr. Giuseppe Mendini, who also dismissed the idea that the fever was caused by miasms emanating from organic residue during the 13-day long draining of the local Channel of the Reno for summer maintenance. The correlation proposed by Dr. Mendini was based on his own studies of the affected patients, which suggested a pollen-related allergy; and on the following circumstantial observations:

- the annual appearance of the epidemic coincided with the blooming of hemp plants;
- the fever epidemic was stronger during the years that saw the lushest hemp fields, with entire families of farmers being affected;
- the worst cases in a given year similarly occurred in the areas with the lushest fields, due to a higher toxicity of the released pollen;
- as opposed to hay fever, which was also known as an aristocratic disease for mainly affecting intellectuals and members of the upper class, the hemp fever affected mostly the rural populace, while better-located city dwellers were less impacted;
- soldiers stationed in Bologna who were sent off for military exercises, far from the hemp fields, were not affected by the summer fever;
- during the blooming of hemp, both domestic animals, bovines, and equines showed clear signs of nasal pain; and
- while cases of summer fever had been observed in several Italian cities, the first epidemic occurrence was reported in the major hemp-producing center of Bologna, in 1888.

Among hemp spinning workers, a similar poisoning was observed to affect mainly hemp beaters, and to a lesser extent carders, with two different orders of symptoms. In the acute form, patients experienced headache, dyspnea, chills, and various neuralgia; followed by stomatitis, conjunctivitis, nasal ulcerations, as well as erythema and eczema comparable to those of flax workers; while during rest such patients had fantastic dreams. All these symptoms abated and the patients recovered after leaving the profession; however, in the chronic form, such acute events were followed by symptoms that were thropic and nervous in nature. These included extreme weight loss, abdominal retraction, brown coloring of the integuments, excessive hair growth, nail deformity, weaker sensitivity, reduced tendon reflexes, muscle weakness, lack of genital sensitivity, polyuria, and an altered smell of the urine. Similarly to other industries, most of these workers also suffered from bronchitis as a result of the dust inhaled during work.

=== Early drug prohibition ===
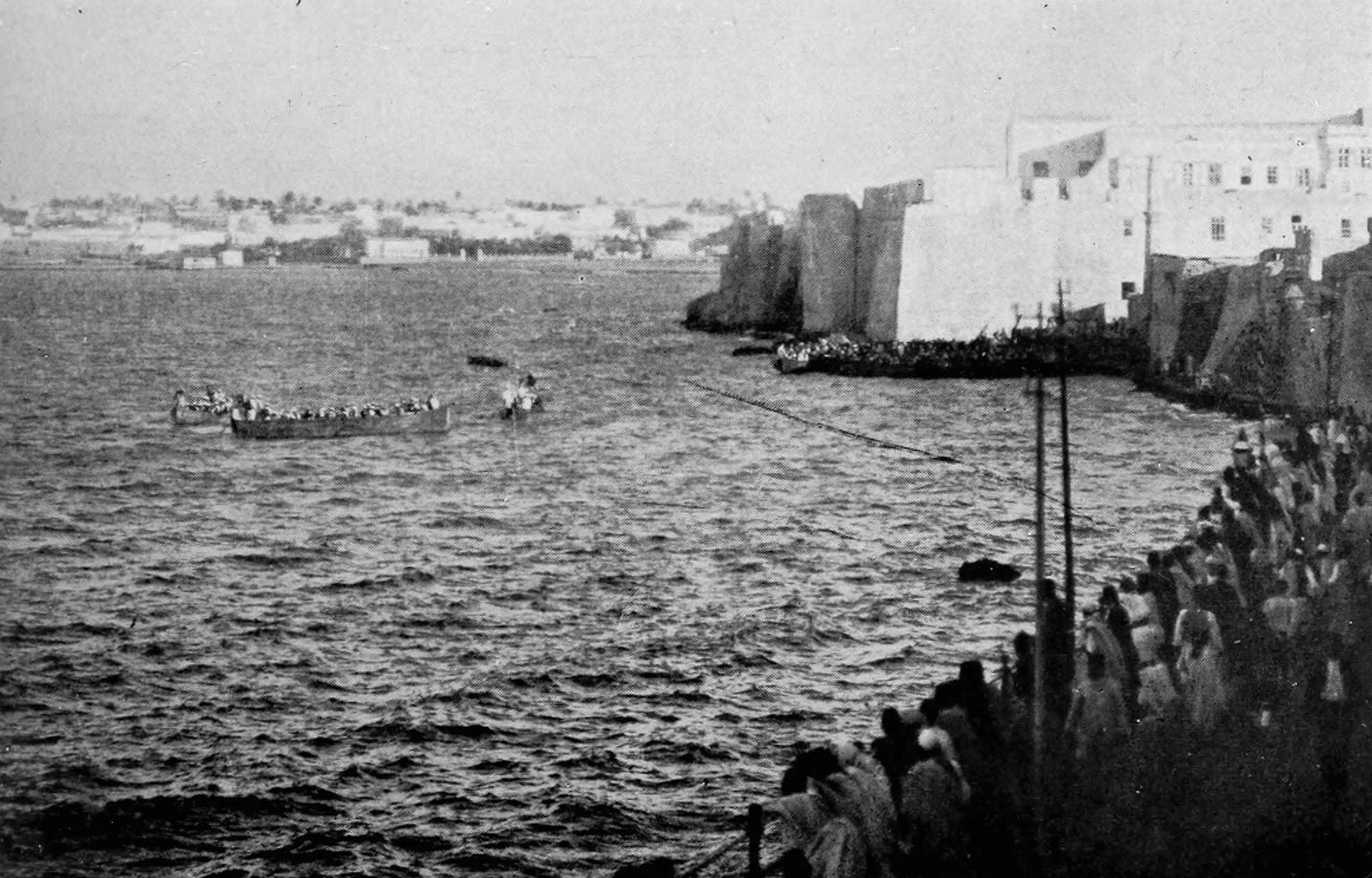
The first detachment of Italian sailors landing underneath the Konak in Tripoli on 5 October 1911.

In the early stages of the international cannabis prohibition, the United States did not play a leading role at all, while the role of Italy, South Africa, Egypt, and Turkey is seen as largely overlooked. At the First International Opium Conference, held in the Hague in 1911–1912, Italy lobbied for an international ban on cannabis, largely due to the prevalence of the use of hashish in its North African colonies of Tripolitania and Cyrenaica, which were annexed from the Ottoman Empire after the Italo-Turkish War of 1911–1912.

Even though the 1912 Conference was focused on opium, leading to the First International Opium Convention, the so-called issue of Indian hemp was examined, however nothing substantial came out of it. Instead, the regulation of cannabis came with the Second International Opium Conference, held in Geneva in 1925, at the behest of Egypt, and previous encouragements from South Africa and Italy, among others. In fact, the use of both marijuana and hashish had already been made illegal in Italy through the passage of the Mussolini-Oviglio Law 396/23, on 18 February 1923.

In any case, the section of the 1925 Opium Convention dealing with cannabis represented a compromise, in which the signatories were committed to limit exclusively to medical and scientific purposes the manufacture, import, sale, distribution, export and use of extracts and tinctures of Indian hemp. The final document did not constitute an absolute prohibition, since it only dealt with the international trade of cannabis, while it neither prohibited its production, imposed controls on domestic traffic or consumption, nor mandated government production estimates. In fact, the compromise changed the language that was used in the proposed first draft, which incurred the objections of countries like India, where weaker cannabis-based preparations often accompanied social events, religious ceremonies, and festivals, even though the more potent hashish was generally frowned upon. In regard to the matter, the United Kingdom remained ambivalent, while the United States remained focused on opium.

=== Industrial hemp sector ===
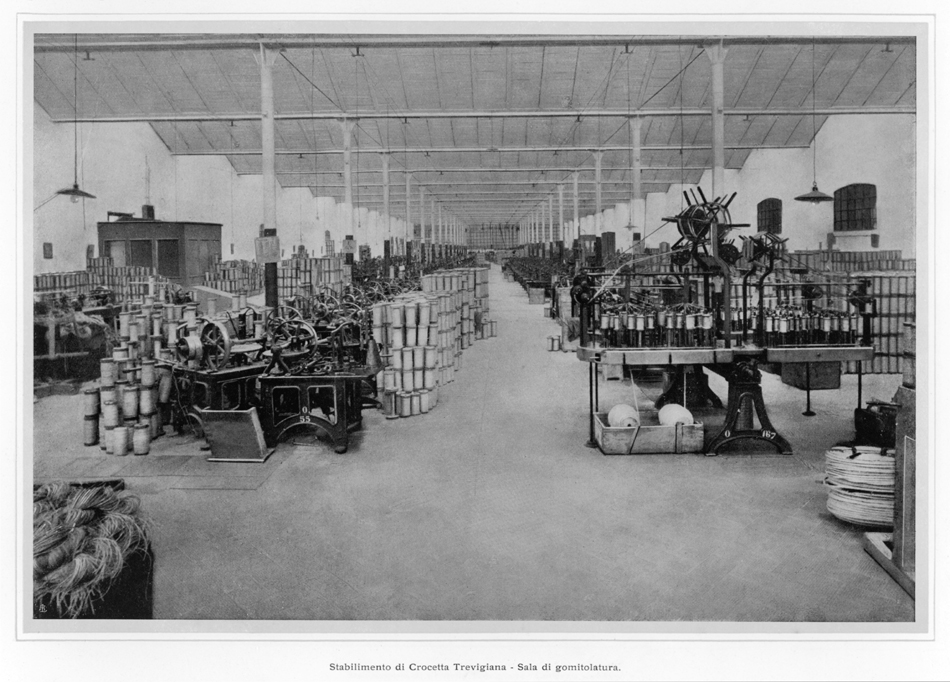
Interior of the Canapificio Veneto factory in Crocetta Trevigiana, near Treviso, around 1920.

The transformations brought about by the French Revolution and the following conflicts during the late 18th – early 19th century, marked the end of protectionist Italian hemp sectors such as those implemented in the Kingdom of Piedmont and the Republic of Venice, which had created privileged manufactures supported by the State according to a Colbertist model. Nevertheless, even though these producers could not compete with good quality, cheaper, imported fabrics, rural areas developed a more resilient proto-industrial textile sector based on the self-organisation of local families. As a result, the rural hemp sector increased its share in the textile production in Italy, while also limiting the scope of new industrial enterprises, with the Italian hemp industry not fully developing until the 1870s.

The first attempts to mechanize the spinning and weaving of hemp took place during the 1840s in Lombardy, followed by the establishment of important hemp processing factories between the 1850s and 1870s in Veneto and Emilia, and around the shipyards of Genoa and Naples. The growth of the industrial hemp sector saw the prominence of Lombardy, thanks to the availability of both capitals and technical skills, with three Lombard companies in particular cornering the national market during the 1870s and 1880s. In 1873, these private businesses merged into the Linificio e Canapificio Nazionale, with the purpose of industrializing the processing of flax and hemp, thus establishing one of the oldest fiber-processing companies in the world that is still in operation to the present day. By the beginning of the 20th century, the Linificio e Canapificio Nazionale reportedly became the largest manufacturer of hemp threads and fabrics in Europe; however, during the 1920s, the Italian production only managed to cover the internal demand for these products, even when including the several other smaller producers. In any case, hemp production in Italy expanded significantly during the 1860s and 1870s, but then experienced a contraction as part of the general crisis in the European agriculture of the 1880s. In addition, other more permanent factors also contributed to the decline of the hemp sector, including the competition from other fiber crops and foreign imports, the reduced need of hemp ropes and sails for ships, the lack of new technologies in the maceration and processing of hemp, and the damage caused by infesting plants such as the Orobanche ramosa. Nevertheless, at the end of the 19th century the hemp sector was still fundamental for the Italian rural economy, and it made Italy the second producer and exporter of hemp worldwide after Russia.

The plentiful home supply of good raw hemp, combined with comparatively cheap labor, generally gave the Italian hemp industry a competitive advantage in the international market of the 1920s, especially with the fall in Russian hemp production after the Great War and the rise in the prices for vegetable fibres until 1930. Nevertheless, the significant costs associated with the used machinery, combined with the somewhat limited domestic demand for hemp textiles, made the industry dependent on its foreign customers for disposing of its products, mostly in the form of raw hemp and tow. In fact, the notable size of the Italian hemp sector even led to an overproduction crisis in 1921, which caused the prices of hemp to fall heavily, and the cultivation area to significantly shrink for the following two years. According to contemporary analyses, the improvements needed by the Italian hemp industry at the time included a more careful selection of the planted seeds; using the plant residues to manufacture cellulose instead of burning it; mechanizing the process of separating the fiber from the plant; as well as enhancing both the existing agricultural methods and the techniques used in the domestic textile industry, to make hemp textile preferable to linen and cotton.

During the Ventennio, the Fascist regime gave particular attention to hemp as an autarkic fiber, with a specific policy of using it to replace imported fibers (e.g. cotton), satisfy the internal demand, and develop exports. As a result, the use of hemp was expandend to several new sectors during the 1930s, with the support of a State purchasing program, and the national cultivation area increased significantly between 1934 and 1941, before starting to decline in 1942.

==== Labor market ====
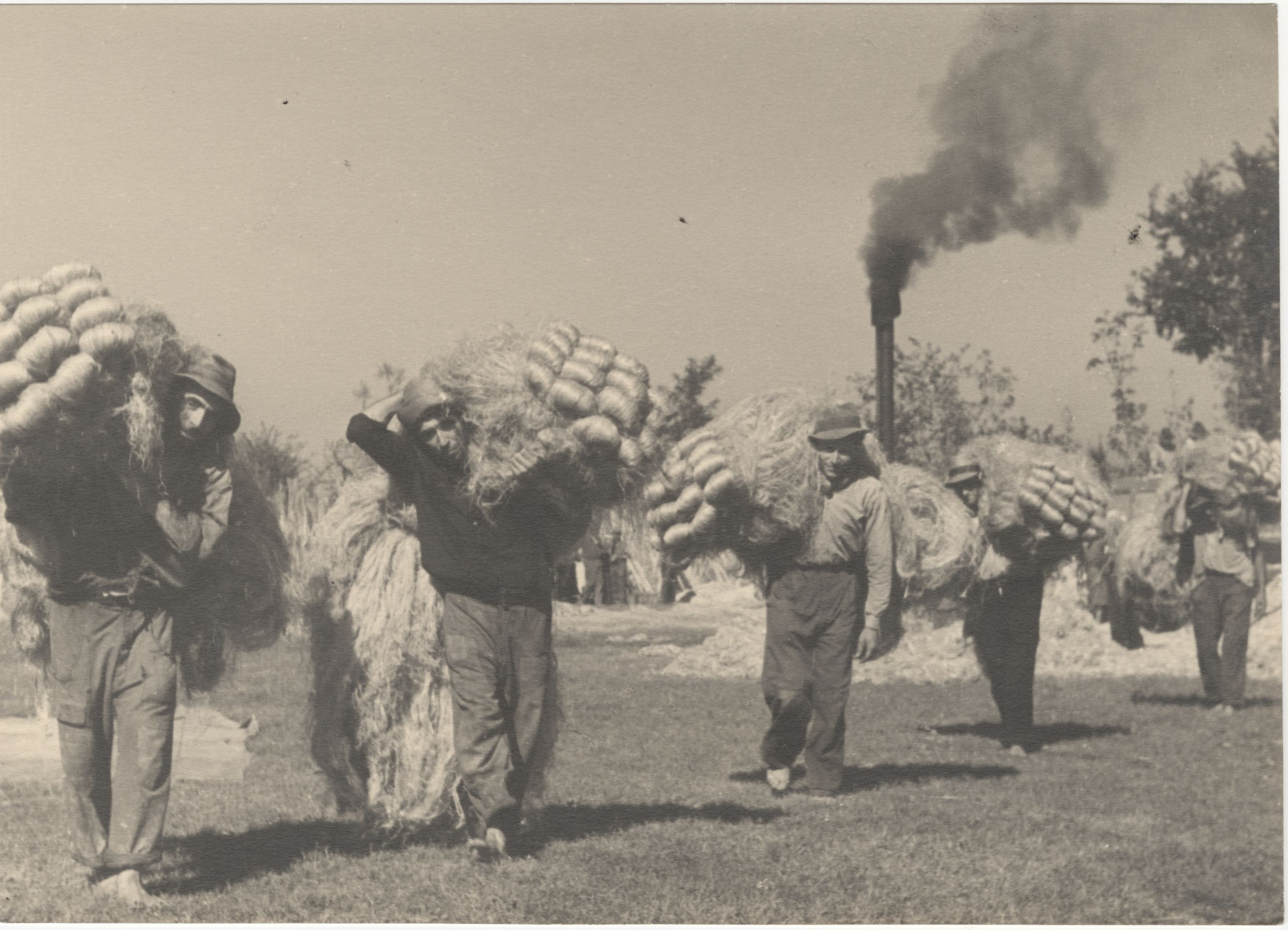
Laborers carrying bundles of hemp fiber in 1930.

Par vedar un bel canvil, semna in avril.
Note. Emilian proverb on growing hemp, meaning To see a good hemp field, sow in April.

In terms of the contemporary working conditions, the wages of Italian farmers in 1920 could range between the equivalents of 10 to 12 US¢/h (i.e., 1.28 to 1.53 US$/h in 2019) for heavy summer work (e.g. harvesting, threshing, and gathering hemp), around 7 US¢/h (i.e., 0.89 US$/h in 2019) for lighter summer work, and a minimum of 5 US¢/h (i.e., 0.64 US$/h in 2019) in winter. Daily working hours were fixed at a maximum of eight in the summer, while overtime was exceptional and paid at a rate between 25% and 50% above the normal wage, and in no case could the work day exceed ten hours. As a reference, it was calculated at the time that each hectare of hemp field required at least 2,600 working hours in total from the different categories of workers involved in the sector, namely 1,000 hours from farmers, mezzadri, coparticipants, and casual workers; 100 hours from the various supply chain workers, including haulers, carriers, warehouse workers, and packagers; and at least 1,500 hours from industrial workers. In the hypothetical case that all the hemp fiber produced in Italy was processed domestically, and considering the 100,000 ha (1,000 km^{2}; 386 mi^{2}) in the entire national cultivation area, the Italian hemp sector at the time would have required annually a total of 32.5 million working days.

In many parts of the country, the use of machinery was allowed only on condition of full employment of all available labor, including women, while workers had to be hired exclusively through a labor exchange, on which both employers and laborers were represented. Moreover, joint municipal commissions determined the minimum number of hands to be employed on each farm, with some districts requiring landowners to commit to steadily employ one person for every 15 acres (0.061 km^{2}), while also giving precedence to union labor. Joint commissions of employers and laborers were also appointed to verify that the work was fairly distributed between permanent and casual labor, with agreements stipulating that the use of machinery had to cease when unemployment was prevalent in a certain area.

In the early 1930s, the Italian hemp sector suffered a significant downturn, which caused the national production to decrease from an estimated 123,900 t in 1925 to 50,000 t in 1932, while the cultivation area decreased from 111,500 ha (1,115 km^{2}; 431 mi^{2}) to 57,000 ha (570 km^{2}; 220 mi^{2}) over the same period. (Note: Different sources may report slightly different figures, as it can be noticed from the estimates listed for the same years in the National Hemp Production Table, in the next section.) The main factors that contributed to the crisis included a reduced demand for Italian hemp from foreign buyers, as a consequence of both the Great Depression of 1929–1939 and international competition; a reduction in the price of cotton; an increased and significant competition from foreign fibers, including Manila hemp and sisal; a limited adaptability of the Italian hemp industries to the expanding needs of the consumers, when compared to the great potentials offered by both the cotton and jute industries; and a relative increase in the production costs of hemp fiber, due to both tax and wage rises. All these factors prompted a political discussion on the need for a complete overhaul of the hemp production and processing sector, to improve it as much as possible, given that over half of all the hemp factories shut down as a result of the crisis, while the cotton and jute industry sectors were still respectively operating at 75.8% and 68–76% capacity, compared to pre-crisis levels. Furthermore, the Italian hemp sector at the time employed an estimated 30,000 industrial workers, as well as 500,000 farm workers from 100,000 families, most of whom had suddenly found themselves out of work.

==== Italian hemp varieties ====
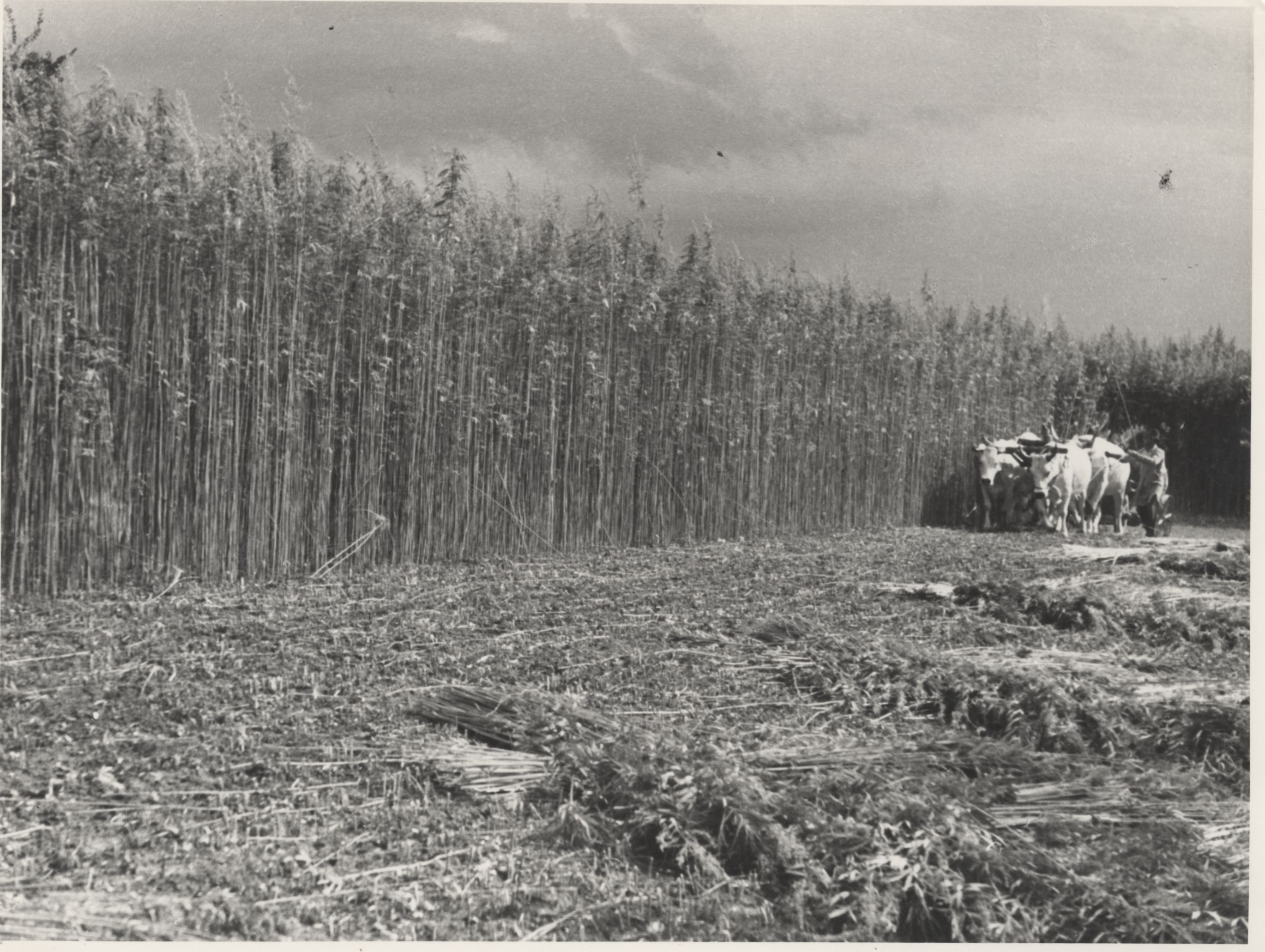
Traditional hemp cutting in 1955, using an ox-drawn mower.

Mais ce ne sont pas de tiges de chanvre ces-ci, ce sont des arbres!
Note. Interjection attributed to prof. Janusz Jagmin, Director of the Hemp-growing Facility of Poland, meaning But these are not hemp stalks, they are trees!, referring to the 7 m (23.0 ft) tall Canapa gigante hemp plants on display at the First Agricultural Exhibition of the Housewives of Carmagnola in 1935.

During the 1920s, the main varieties of cannabis sativa cultivated in Italy were commonly divided into the Pedemontana and Sinensis denominations, while the cannabis indica varieties were not grown in the country. These cultivars could also be divided into giant hemp plants, which were considered suitable for the production of fiber; and dwarf hemp plants, which were instead considered suitable for the production of seeds, although such distinction was not as clear-cut due to the various factors that could ultimately determine their height. In any case, the main Italian hemp varieties included:

- the Bologna (a.k.a. great hemp or chanvre de Piedmont in France), cultivated in the provinces of Bologna, Ferrara, and Modena in Emilia-Romagna, and Rovigo in Veneto. This cultivar averaged nearly 12 ft (3.7 m) in height thanks to the local rich alluvial soil, as well as the intensive cultivation that was practiced there. However, the variety was found to deteriorate rapidly when cultivated elsewhere, namely ranging just between 8 ft (2.4 m) and 11 ft (3.4 m) in height when grown in dedicated test sites that were set up in Washington, D.C., and Lexington, KY. Nevertheless, it was recommended in the 1914 USDA report as one of the most promising varieties for introduction in the United States, in small quantities, for the purpose of improving the Kentucky hemp by means of cross-fertilisation and selection.
- the Canapa piccola (i.e., small hemp), cultivated in the Arno valley in Tuscany, with plants ranging between 4 ft (1.2 m) and 7 ft (2.1 m) in height locally, while ranging between 4 ft (1.2 m) and 6 ft (1.8 m) in height in the test sites.
- the Neapolitan varieties, cultivated in the area around Naples in Campania, and even on the sides of Mount Vesuvius, with the large seeded cultivar ranging between 7 ft (2.1 m) and 10 ft (3.0 m) in height in the test sites, while the small seeded cultivar rarely exceeded 4 ft (1.2 m) in height at the same location.
- the Ortichina (i.e., small nettle) varieties, which group together several dwarf cultivars, some of which were exclusively used for the production of seeds in central and southern Italy. In particular, Frattamaggiore and Aversa were two other noteworthy centers for the cultivation of hemp in Campania.
- the Canapa gigante (i.e., giant hemp), cultivated in the area around Carmagnola in Piedmont, with plants ranging between 5 m (16.4 ft) and 6 m (19.7 ft) in height, thanks to their significantly reduced medullary cavity which increased their robustness. However, similarly to the other hemp varieties, such height could be negatively affected by several factors, including growing the plants in a different environment or cross-breeding them with poor-quality foreign hemp seeds. As an example, anomalous weather conditions in Carmagnola in 1936 caused abnormal height differences even in the best quality giant hemp, in a rare phenomenon that was labelled at the time as climatic dwarfism.

The average yield in Italy, based on statements of annual average yields for 5 to 10 years, was estimated in 1914 to be equal to 622 lb/acre (697.2 kg/ha) of hemp fiber, which was the second-biggest yield in Europe after France, which produced an average of 662 lb/acre (742.0 kg/ha). In the 1920s, the average yield in the whole Kingdom was instead reported equal to 1,000 kg/ha (892.2 lb/acre), with peaks of more than 1,200 kg/ha (1,071 lb/acre) in the major production centers.

In the 1940s, Italy was believed to be the second-biggest producer of industrial cannabis in the world, after the Soviet Union, although statistics from China, another major producer, are not available. According to the national farmers association Coldiretti, almost 100,000 ha (1,000 km^{2}; 386 mi^{2}) of farm land in Italy were dedicated to the production of cannabis at the time. Moreover, according to contemporary newsreels, the main hemp-producing Regions were Emilia-Romagna, Terra di Lavoro, and Piedmont, with the annual national production of bast fibre reaching as much as 130,000 t, while the average yield was still reported equal to 1,000 kg/ha (892.2 lb/acre).

=== Italian hemp trade ===
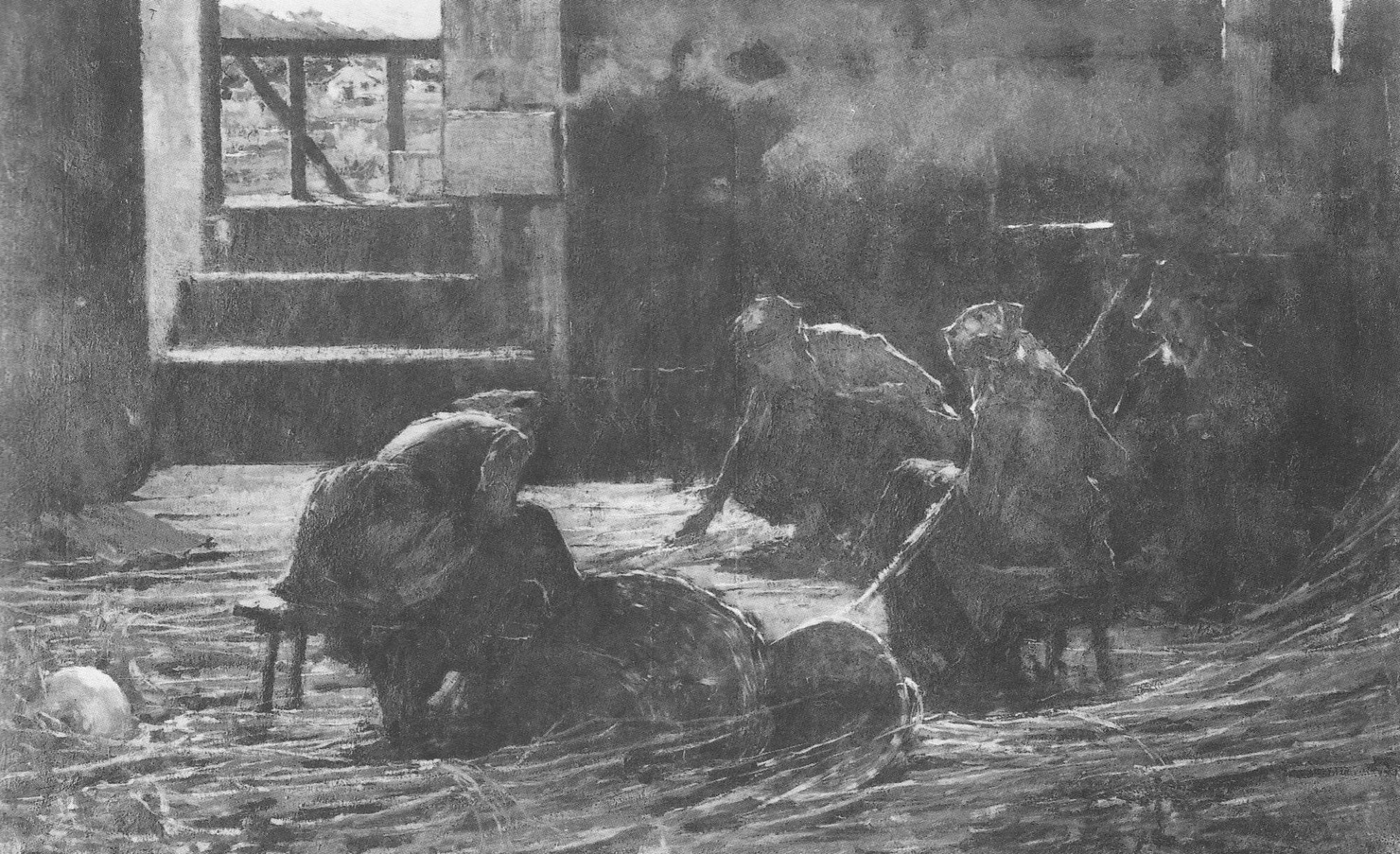
Painting by Francesco Filippini depicting the manual scutching of hemp stalks in 1890.

Hemp has been placed on the Nation's agenda by the Duce, because by its autarkic excellence it is destined to emancipate us as much as possible from the burdensome tribute we still provide abroad in the textile fiber sector. It is not only the agricultural-economic side that interests us, but also the social side, whose impact could not be better highlighted than by the following figure: 30,000 workers employed by the Italian hemp industry. (Note: In this excerpt, Mussolini is referring to himself in the third person.)
Note. Excerpt translated from a speech by Italian dictator and journalist Benito Mussolini in 1925, on the importance that the hemp sector had for the Fascist regime, in the context of the contemporary negative balance of trade for textiles.

By the end of the 19th century, the Italian hemp was considered the best one among those imported into the American market, so much so that the more careful cultivation and processing practices used in Italy, as well as France, were proposed as reference for those American growers wishing to improve their products from the cheaper, less sought-after, dark hemp to the higher-priced light hemp, and thus compete with the imported goods. On the other hand, Russian hemp ropes of the best quality were more extensively used by the US Navy than any other rope type, while Italian hemp was only used for packing for engines, since its price was more than double that of Russian hemp at a time of lower demand, considering that both warships and merchant vessels were transitioning from sailing ships to steamships. In any case, the United States Department of Agriculture compiled a report on the worldwide production of hemp in 1914, citing Italy as one of the main producer of hemp fiber for export, together with Russia, Hungary, and Romania. In fact, the yearly average estimates for the five years between 1909 and 1913 reported 80,902 ha (809 km^{2}; 312 mi^{2}) of farm land in Italy being occupied by hemp fields, producing 83,500 t of hemp fiber, compared to a yearly worldwide production ranging between 500,000 and 800,000 t.

Although not as important as silk, as far as the textile industry was concerned, hemp was one of the few raw textile materials that Italy exported, considering that the country was at the time the second-biggest producer in Europe, after Russia. The hemp fiber produced in Italy was exported at a rate of 50% of production on average, together with a considerable amount of tow, and the main importers of Italian hemp in the 1920s were Germany, England, (Note: Even though England is specifically mentioned in the cited source, it is possibly a misnomer referring to the whole United Kingdom.) France, Belgium, the Netherlands, and the United States. The quality of Italian hemp was highly appreciated, especially due to the excellent manner in which it is handled during the extraction of the fiber by the highly skilled rural labor trained in this task. Nevertheless, the 1914 USDA report already described the Italian hemp as the highest-priced hemp fiber in both the American and European markets, further noting that it was obtained from plants that were similar to those cultivated in Kentucky at the time. The cause of the higher price was attributed to the process of water retting, as well as to the increased care and labor involved in the preparation of the fiber. This made the water-retted Italian hemp less competitive against the dew-retted American hemp, whose main competitors at the time were the dew-retted Russian and Hungarian hemp. On the other hand, its different qualities made it more suitable for use in certain kinds of twines, as well as the finer grades of carpet warp, for which the American hemp was not well suited.

In regard to hemp seeds, they were primarily used in Italy for planting new crops, but they were also exported, especially the Carmagnola variety. As an example, more than 8,000 ha (80 km^{2}; 31 mi^{2}) of farm land in the region of Odessa, in Ukraine, were sowed in 1933 using Canapa gigante hemp seeds imported from Italy; and the successful acclimatization of the plants led to expansion plans for the following year to the regions of Kiev and Kharkov. However, in case of short supplies, such as during the shortage that occurred in 1924 as a consequence of the aforementioned significant reductions in the cultivation area in 1922 and 1923, hemp seeds could also be imported to Italy from abroad. In the case of the 1924 shortage, exotic hemp seeds of the small nettle varieties were imported from both Manchuria and Russia, although they were considered of low quality, as they began to blossom already in April instead of late July, while the resulting plants were severely limited in height. Considering the significant damages caused by the imported seeds to large swathes of the Italian hemp fields, the situation was seen as an opportunity for American hemp farmers to promote their own seeds as a high-quality alternative. In particular, American exporters were advised to provide guarantees, such as the year in which the seeds were gathered and the assured germination percentage, since it was more or less customary for Italian farmers to delay payment until after germination, and to seek either a discount or a rebate in proportion to the difference between the percentage of germinating seeds and the initial guarantee.

In the late 1920s – early 1930s, Italian hemp exports decreased significantly, as did the national consumption, in the context of the contemporary monetary policy of revaluation of the lira. During the 1930s, the main importer of Italian hemp was by far Germany, which at the time acquired over 70% of the exports, followed by France and the United Kingdom. Nevertheless, the exports of raw hemp declined substantially during that period with respect to the previous decade, mainly due to the increase in the internal demand, whose purpose was to reduce cotton imports by replacing them with mixtures of hemp and other fibers; although it was estimated that the complete replacement of the 200,000 t of annual cotton imports would have required a national hemp cultivation area equal to 250,000 ha (2,500 km^{2}; 965 mi^{2}). The increased internal demand for hemp was also prompted by the economic sanctions that were imposed on Italy by the League of Nations in 1935, as a consequence for the Abyssinia Crisis. As an example, due to the significant difficulties in importing leather under the embargo, the then-emerging luxury fashion house Gucci was forced to develop a new material out of woven hemp sourced from Naples. In fact, the brand's first commercially successful bags were made from this hemp-based material and featured the now iconic brown-on-tan diamond pattern.

=== Hemp fiber production ===
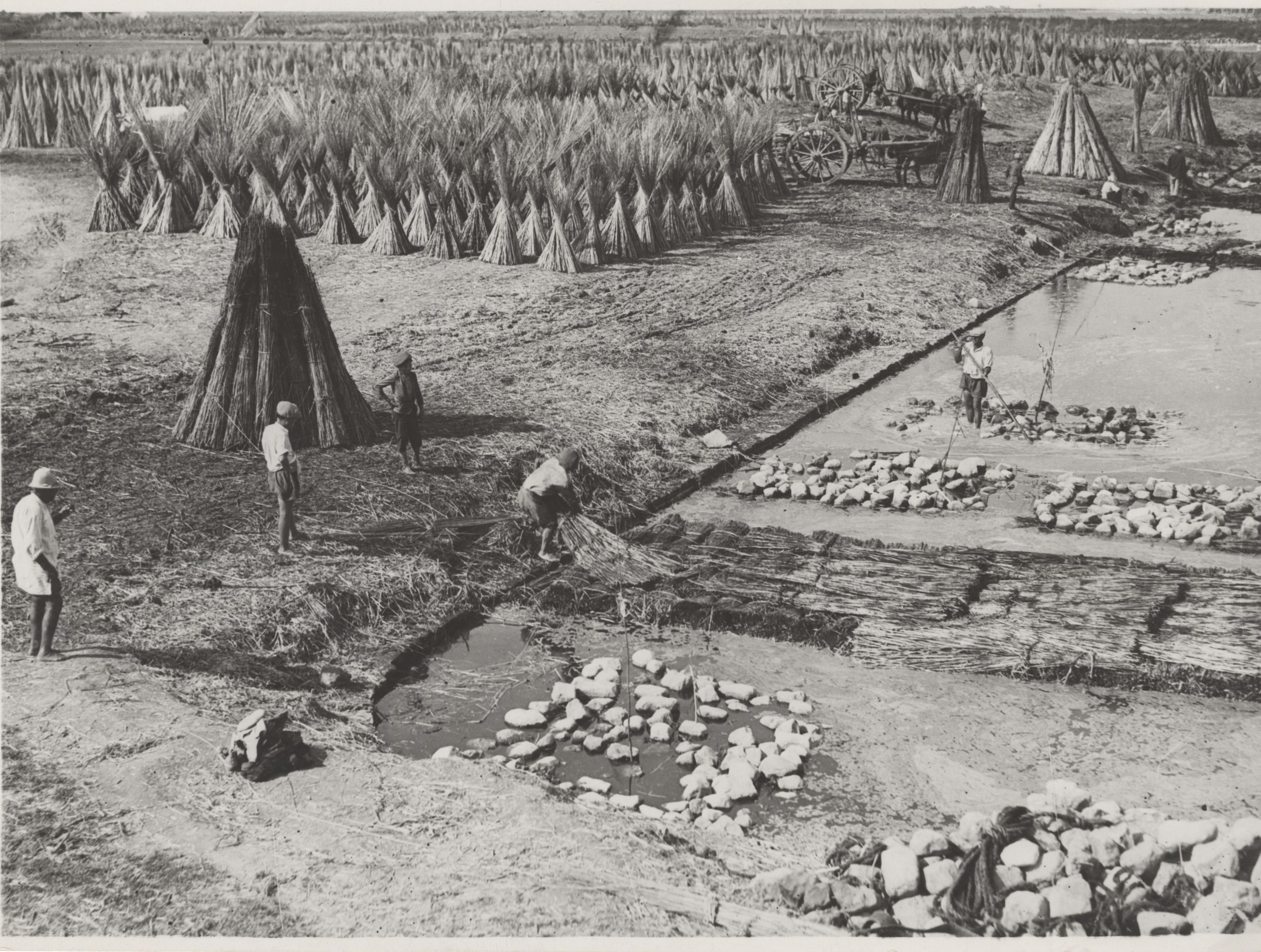
Sheaves of hemp stalks being water-retted and dried in Frattamaggiore in 1930.

La canapa che l'uccello non becca, serve per fare il suo laccio.
Note. Proverb on dealing early with problems, meaning The hemp that the bird doesn't peck, is used to make its snare.

The hemp plants were harvested between the end of July and the beginning of August, either manually or mechanically, after which the stalks were left on the ground to dry, to be then bundled together, stacked into large rafts, weighed down using heavy stones, and immersed into open-air tanks filled with soft water. The initial water retting usually lasted for eight days, after which the sheaves were taken out and dried, and then returned to the tanks for a second slightly longer retting, resulting in a soft white fiber. In the retting tanks, specific bacteria (e.g. Bacillus felsineus) processed the stalks while being kept at the best conditions in terms of temperature and air supply. The retting lasted until the bark, which includes the fiber, readily separated from the stalk, after which the process was interrupted before other bacteria could attack the fiber. After water retting, the inner woody shell of the barks was broken into pieces and removed using either manual tools or movable breaking-and-scutching machines, thus leaving just the clean, long, and straight fiber.

Besides the need of deep, soft, moist, and deeply worked soil that is rich in organic matter, several other factors were identified that could affect both the quality and the quantity of the produced hemp fiber:

- During the sowing, in March, farmers had to take into account the quality of the soil, the amount of fertilizer used, and the desired fiber qualities. In particular, densely planted seeds would produce taller and less-ramified plants, resulting in a long, fine, and delicate fiber, while sparser seeds would produce a coarser and more resistant one.
- During the harvest, between the end of July and the beginning of August, the maturity of the hemp plants had to be carefully assessed, since a difference of a few days could have significant effects. In particular, a premature harvest would produce a paler, less resistant fiber, and also in smaller quantities, while a late harvest would return a thicker, darker, rougher fiber, which was also more labor-intensive to extract. According to historical memory accounts from Emilia-Romagna, for instance, the harvest there generally started on 6 August, when the hemp plants reached the breadth of a finger and a height equal to around 3 m (9.84 ft).
- During the water retting, farmers used their experience and knowledge to determine its duration, which ranged between four and ten days, depending on factors like the water temperature and quality, as well as the particular hemp variety used. Moreover, the quality of the water within the open-air retting tanks was greatly affected by adverse weather, as well as the consecutive rettings of multiple stocks. Furthermore, the possible mishandling of the hemp stalks during this difficult process could also damage the fiber.
- After the retting, the numerous sheaves were each untied at one end and the stalks were then left to dry in the open in cone-shaped stacks. In case of fair weather, the hemp would acquire a good, bright color between blond and light silver, while rain would prevent the hemp from properly drying, and make it lose color and brightness. Moreover, the mud at the feet of the stalks would cause irregular hues, while the dripping rainwater would affect the divisibility of the fiber, and therefore its fineness, elasticity, and its ability to be spun. These risks were significant, since the twice or thrice-repeated retting could extend the process to a few weeks, thus increasing the probability of bad weather.

In the mountainous regions, the irregular terrains prevented the hemp plants from being cultivated and processed on an industrial scale, mainly due to the fragmentation of the fields both in terms of ownership and proximity, to the higher production costs related to the more rudimental techniques used, and to the generally lower quality of the produced fibers, with respect to the ones from the plains. In particular, the mountain hemp fibers were usually shorter and more fragile, and this prevented the application of potentially damaging processing methods, that were instead commonly used elsewhere. On the other hand, they were softer than the lowland fibers thanks to the implemented dew retting process, in which the maceration was based on the action of mycelia rather than bacteria, although in general said process also caused the resulting fibers to acquire significantly darker hues with respect to the water-retted fibers. In any case, the higher production costs and the lower fiber qualities eventually made these activities uncompetitive, which in turn contributed to the depopulation of the mountain regions over time, as said activities could not ultimately be replaced with alternative jobs.

==== Water retting tanks ====
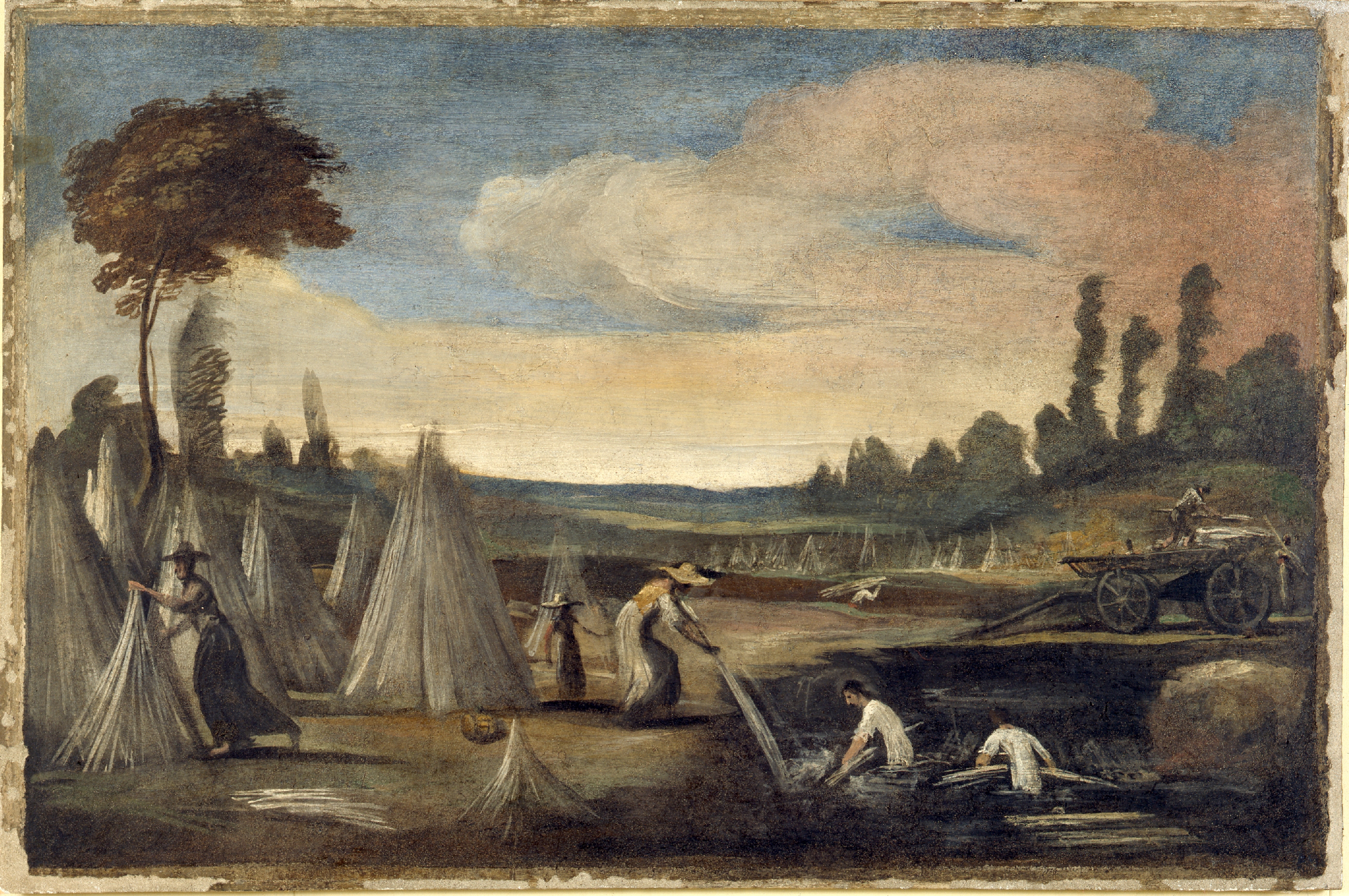
Detached fresco by Guercino depicting the retting of hemp stalks in the 17th century.

The average retting tanks consisted of artificial, water-filled, rectangular basins of variable depths, although they were not usually deeper than 2 m (6.56 ft). These tanks were usually filled up in mid-July through dedicated aqueducts, and could also be used for fish farming, while they were drained again during winter, to remove the sediments and stones that deposited at the bottom during their use. As the water was being pumped out, a significant number of goldfishes, which proliferated inside the tanks during the retting season, was easily caught by hand, and then sorted based on their size, variety, and color, to ultimately be sold as pet fish. For that purpose, part of the catch was also exported all over Europe, while other suitable specimens were instead selected for future breeding, and their numbers were promptly replenished with the extensive use of dried water fleas as feed for their offsprings.

In some locations the retting process was done using running water, still the tanks had to be located far away from population centers, due to the strong odors produced by the maceration of the hemp plants. In particular, the induced microbial fermentation caused the release of several gases, including carbon dioxide, methane, and hydrogen sulphide, while also increasing both the temperature and turbidity of the water. Furthermore, Highway Code regulations promulgated in 1933 regarding the safeguard of public spaces and roads and the circulation of animals and pedestrians, specifically prohibited the free drainage of water from the roads into lateral ditches, as well as the establishment of maceration sites for either hemp or flax within such ditches.

Considering the noticeable impact that maceration sites had on their surroundings, several studies were made regarding the feasibility of replacing the rustic retting process with industrial equivalents, which combined the microbiological processes with artificial chemical ones. In particular, the industrial maceration significantly reduced the required fermentation time from 8–10 days to just 40–50 hours, while also removing the previously mentioned weather-related issues. On the other hand, dedicated studies indicated that the quality of artificially retted fibers was lower with respect to the rustic ones, even though the production percentages for both scutched hemp and tow were almost the same. Most notably, a fierce debate was reported in the 1930s between those in favor and those against the industrialization of the retting process, with the former highlighting the aforementioned advantages in terms of both time and reliability, while also claiming that the retting tanks constituted potential breeding grounds for malaria-carrying mosquitoes. Conversely, advocates of the rustic process pointed at the lower quality of the industrially produced fiber, as well as the economic costs associated with the centralization of the sector, including setting up the factories, transportation costs, and loss of rural jobs; while also dismissing the idea of the retting tanks as centers of malaria, citing studies reportedly showing that mosquitos larvae could not survive in such waters due to the aforementioned effects of the fermentation process.

==== Photo gallery ====
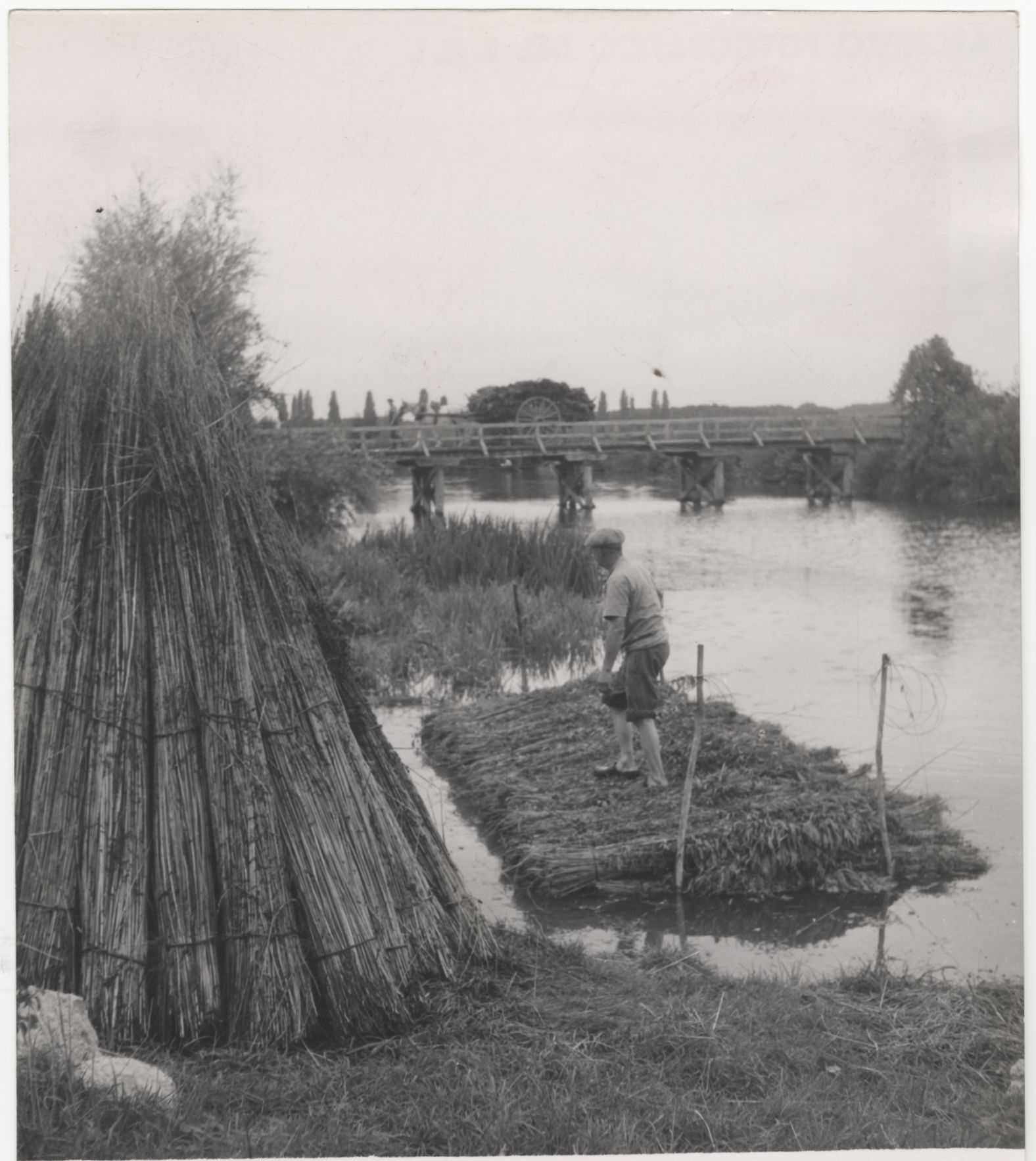
Hemp sheaves being stacked into rafts for the maceration process in Indre-et-Loire in 1959.

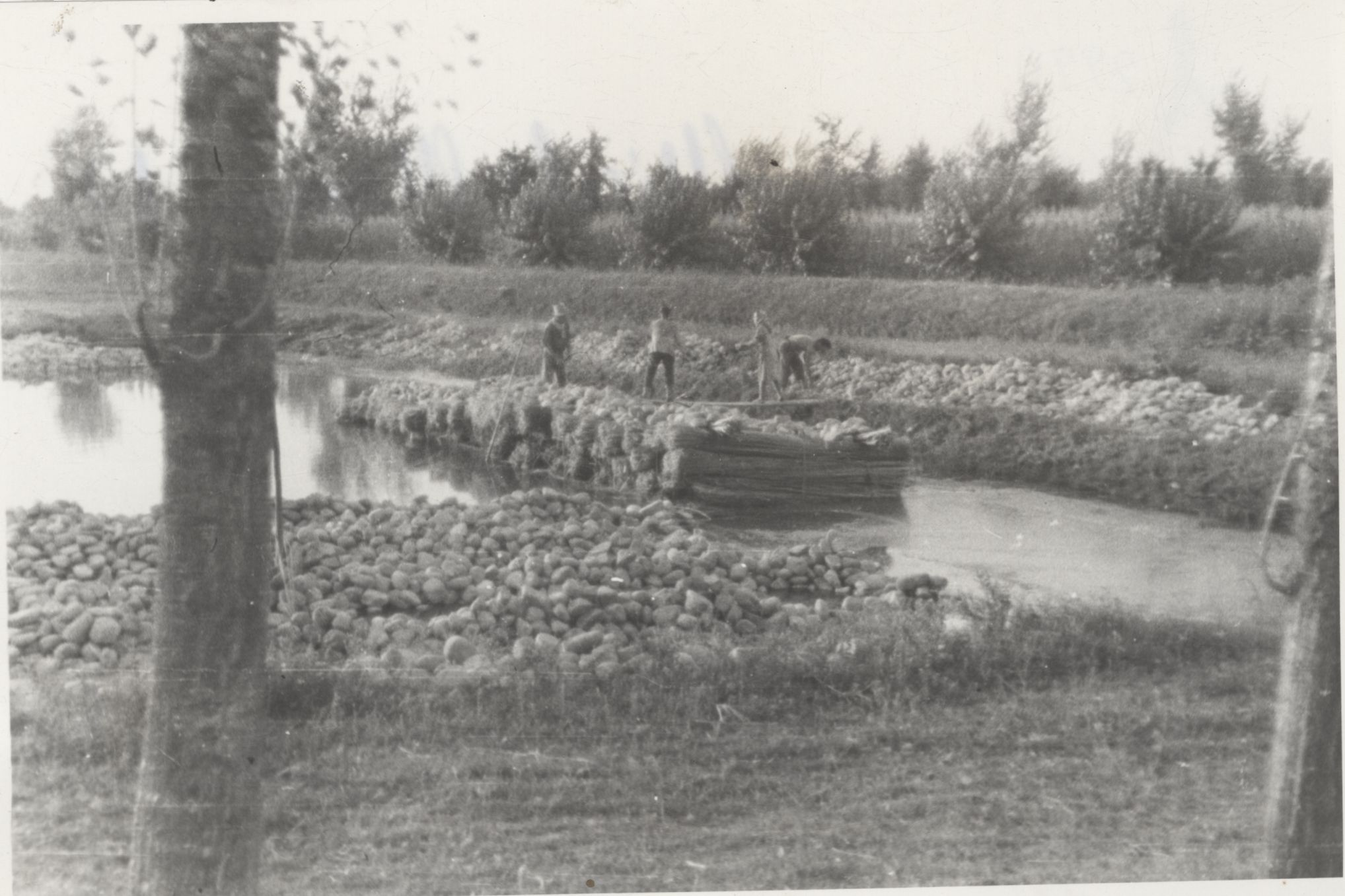
Hemp rafts being weighed down using heavy stones in 1950.

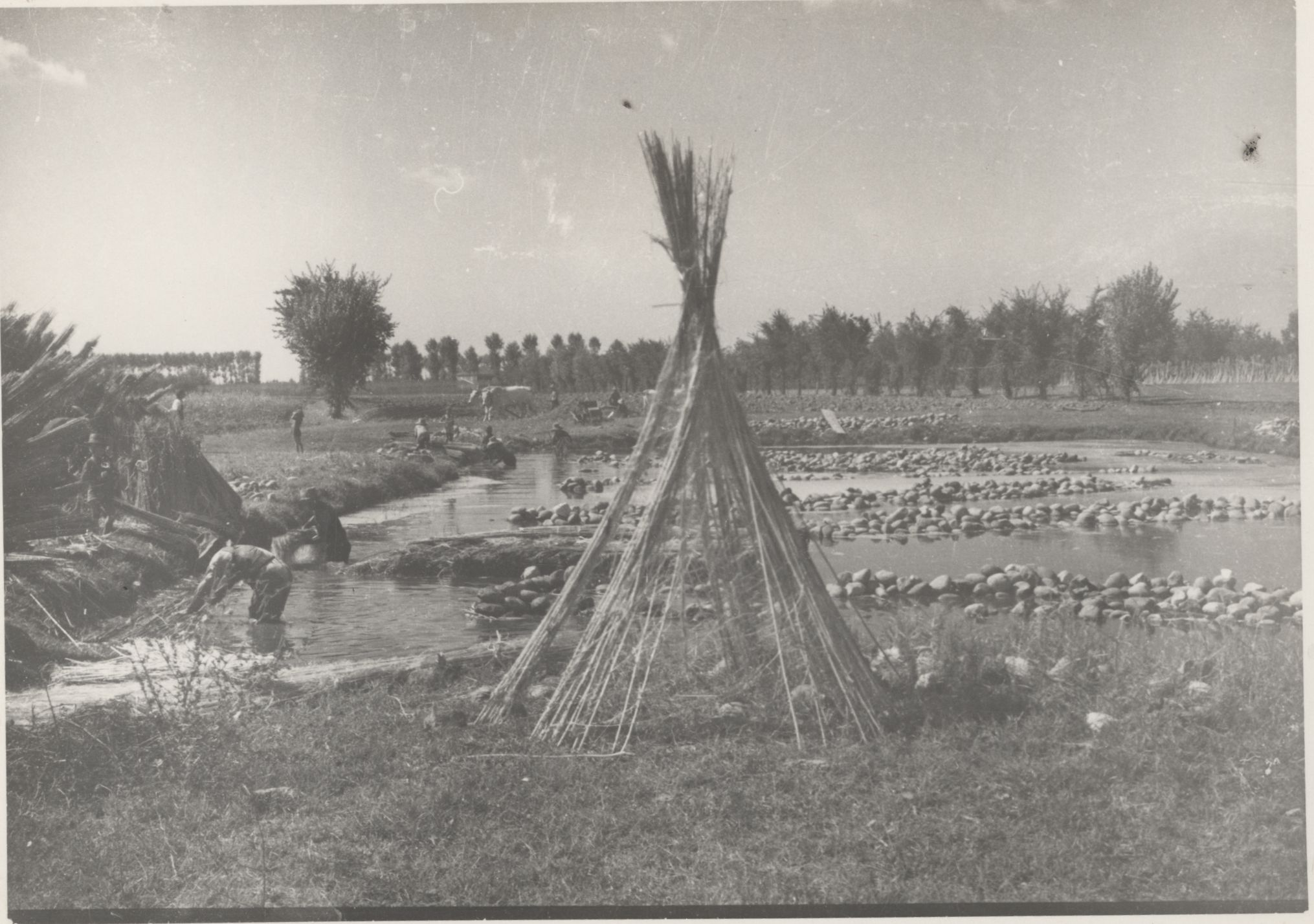
Maceration of hemp in 1950.

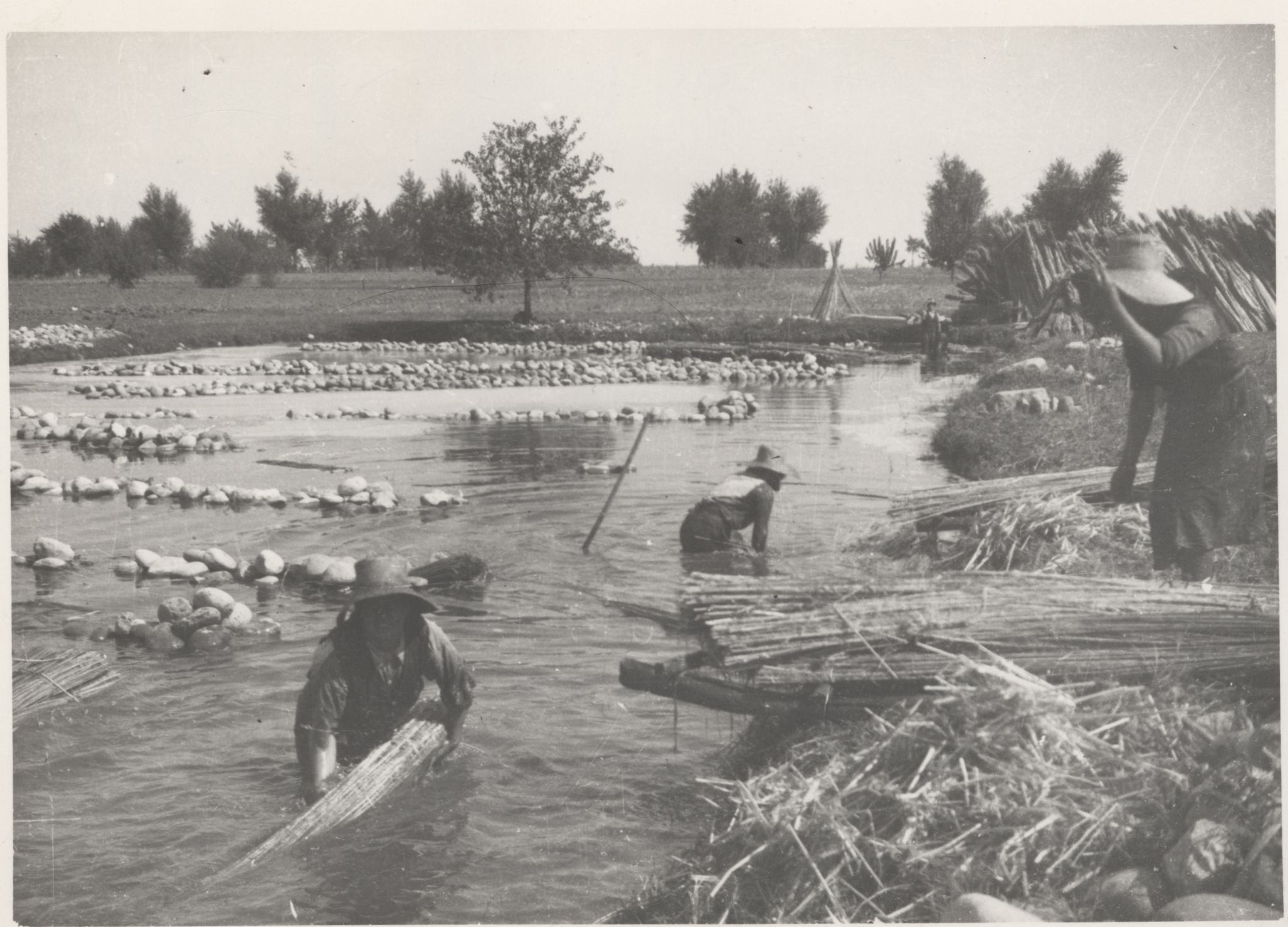
Macerated hemp sheaves being taken out of the retting tanks near Ferrara in 1950.

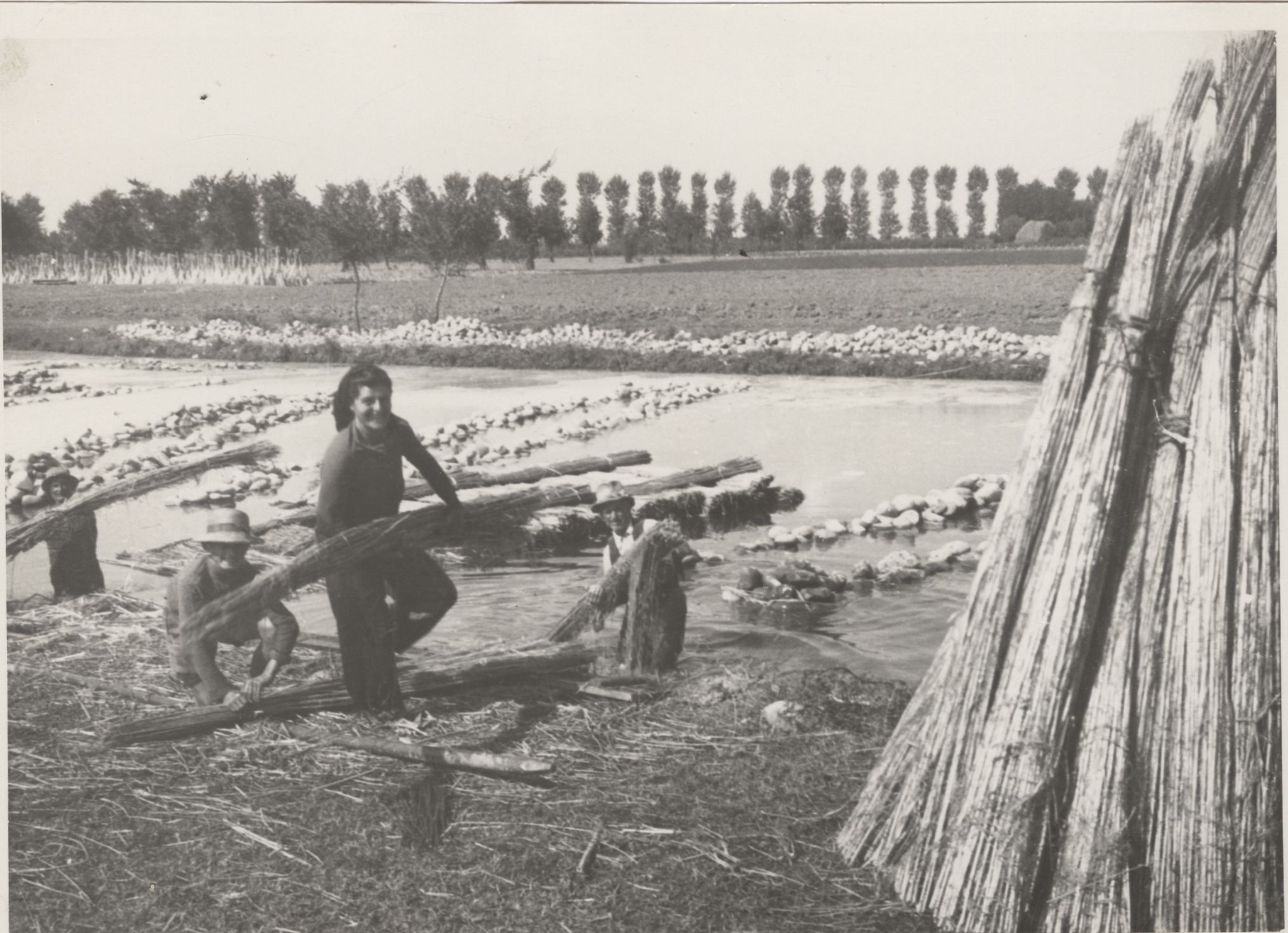
Macerated hemp sheaves being taken out to be dried near Ferrara in 1950.

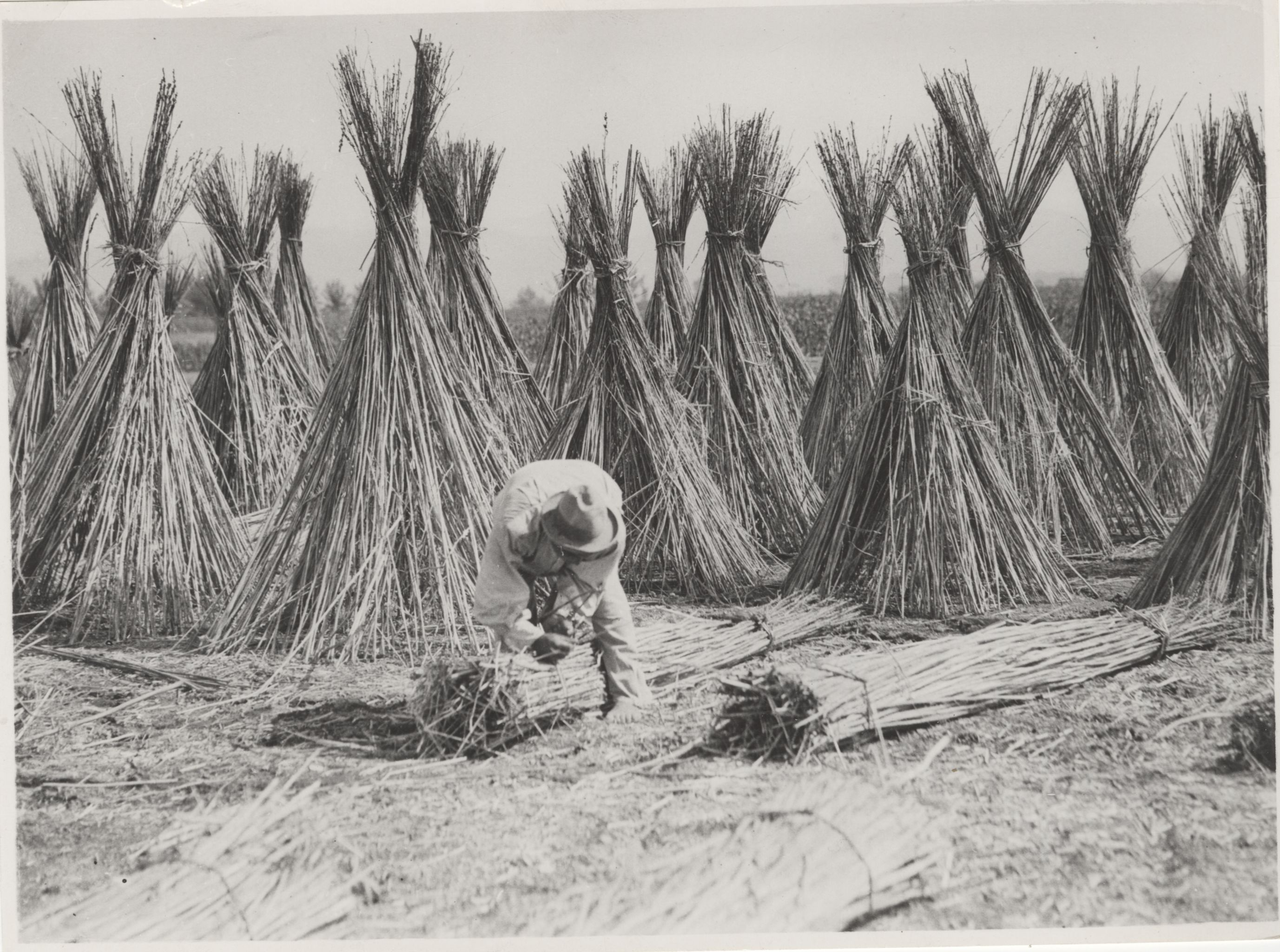
Drying macerated hemp stalks in Frattamaggiore in 1930.

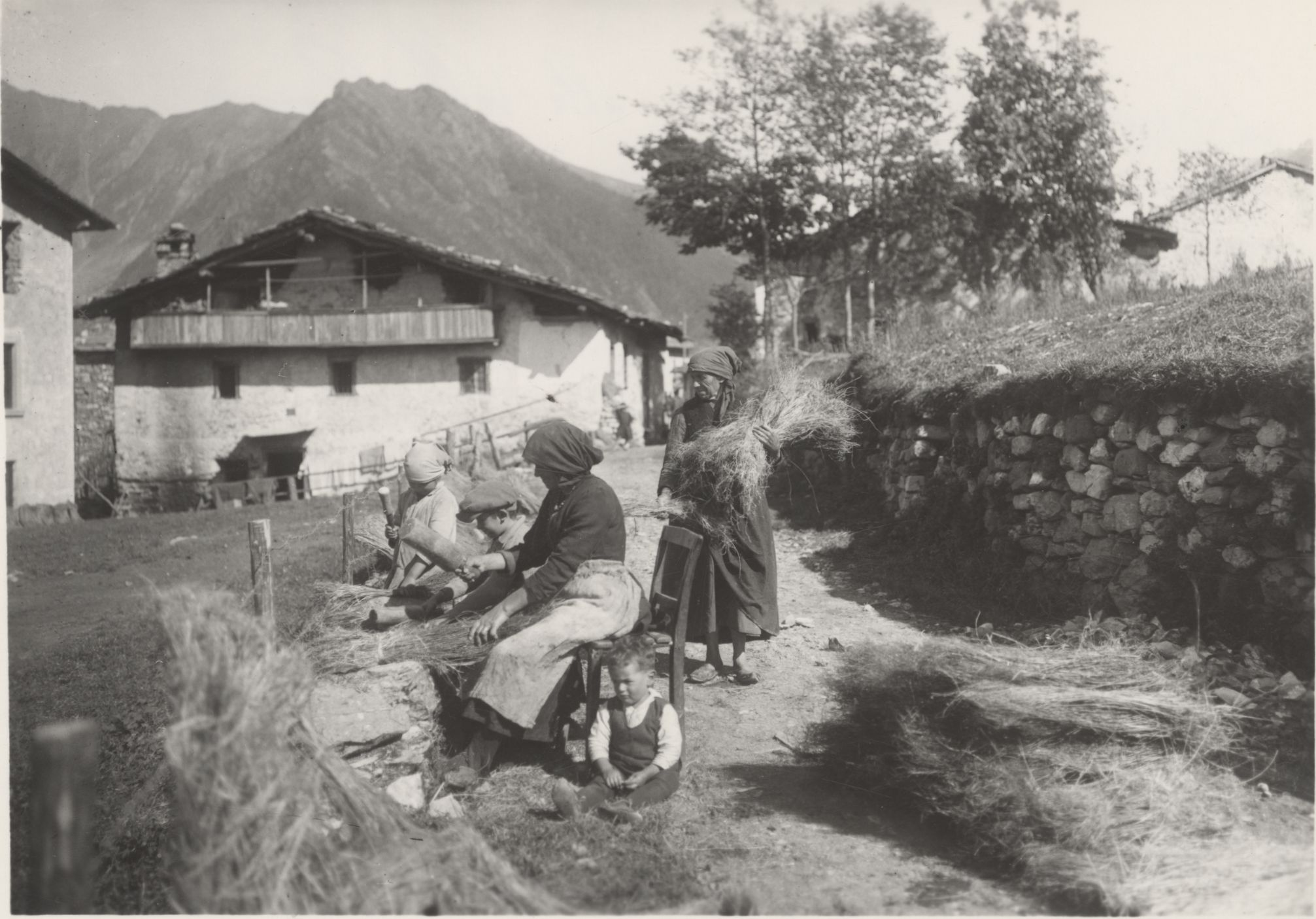
Manual breaking of hemp stalks in Val Camonica in 1950.

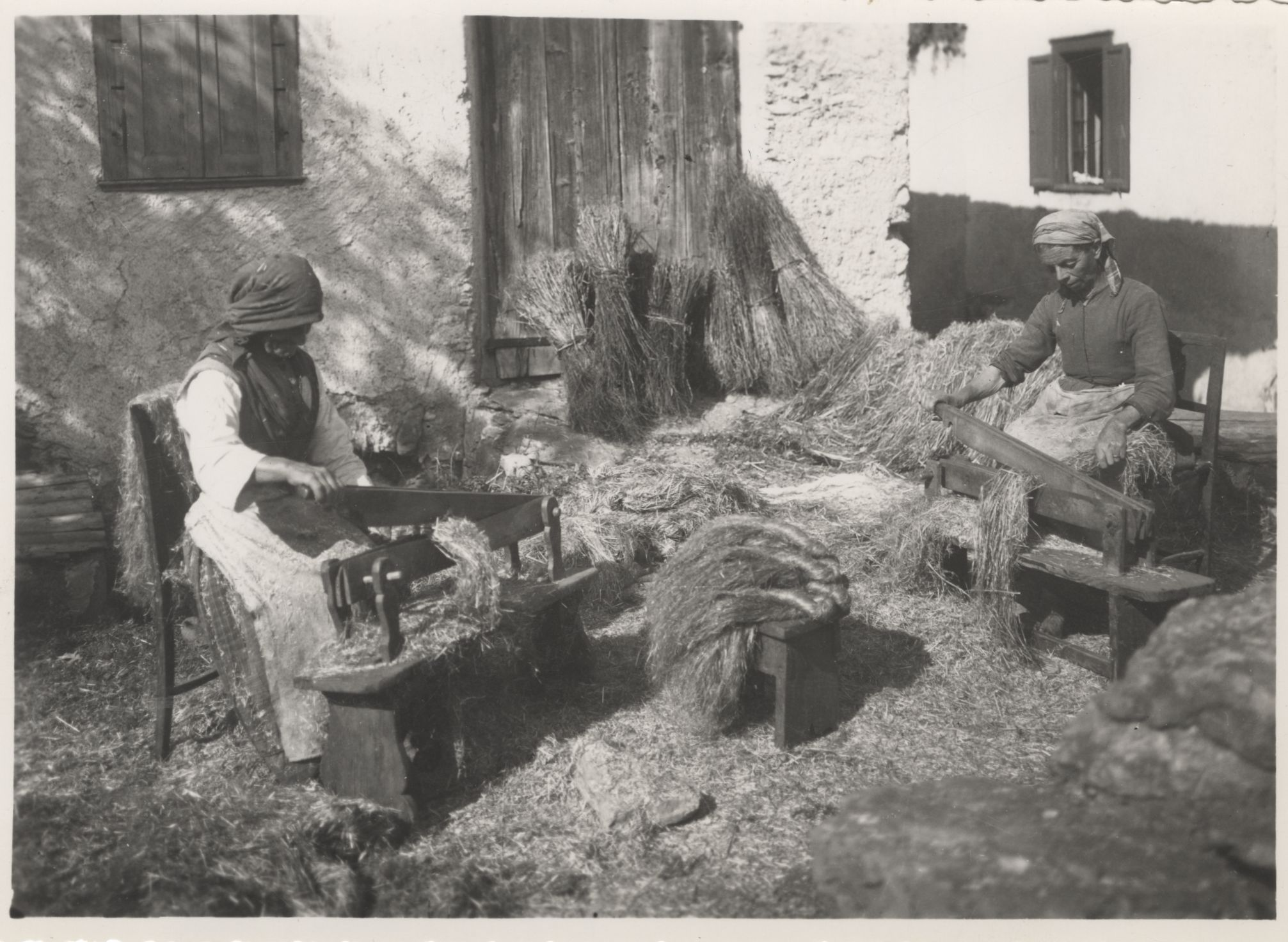
Manual breaking of hemp stalks in Schilpario in 1950.

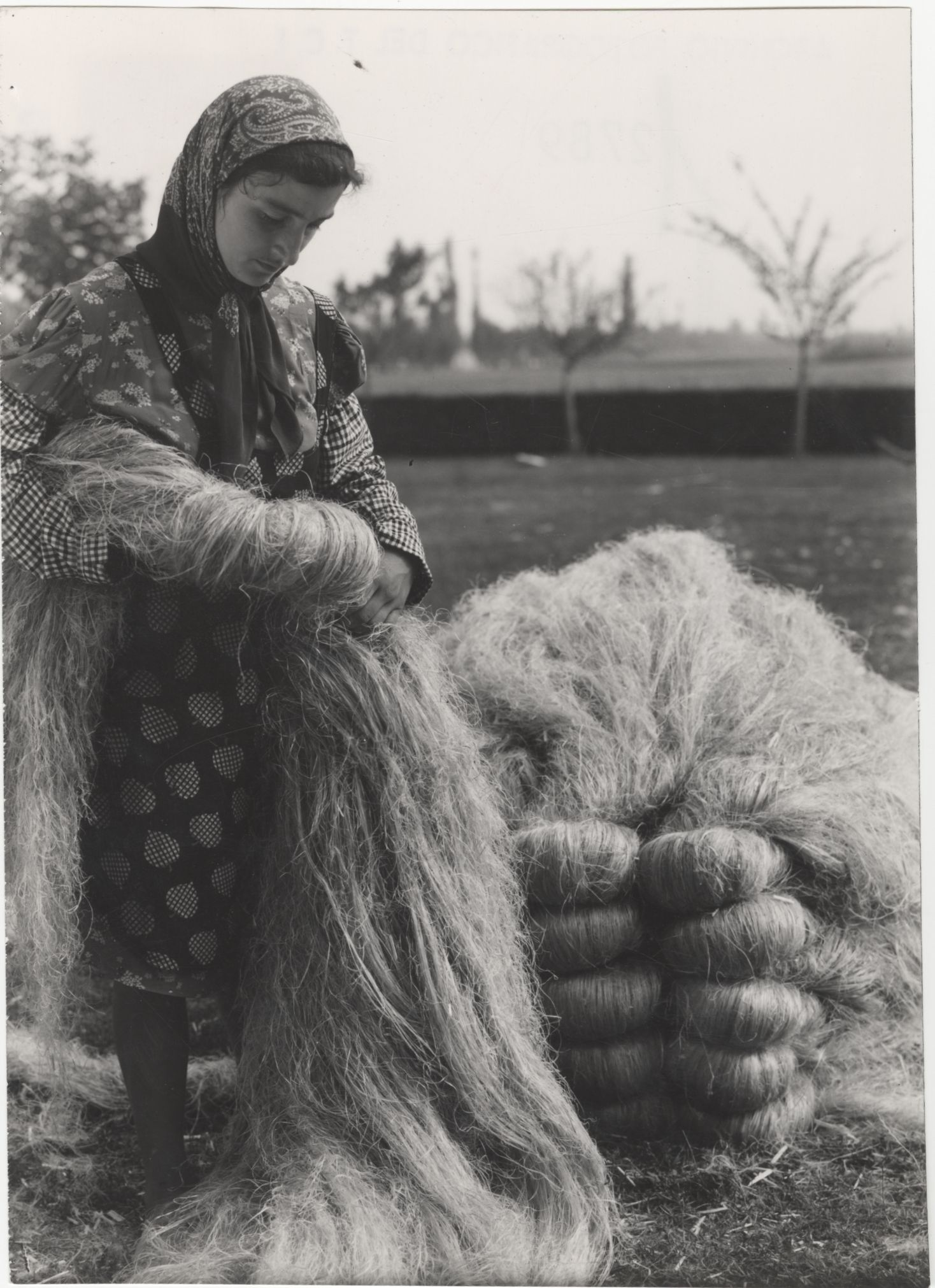
Bundling hemp fiber in 1950.

National yearly estimates or averages for the production of hemp in Italy, with the extrapolated data given in italics.
Year/Period	Cultivation area [ha]	Production [t]	Production rate [kg/ha]	Export [t]	Import [t]	World cultivation area [ha]	World production [t]	Refs.
1864	–	38,400	–	–	–	–	–	
1870–1874	134,900	96,500	715.34	–	–	–	–	
1876–1881	135,400	97,200	717.87	–	–	–	–	
1879–1883	120,300	85,300	709.06	–	–	–	–	
1880	–	81,600	–	–	–	–	–	
1881	–	84,000	–	–	–	–	–	
1882	–	82,300	–	–	–	–	–	
1883	–	87,500	–	–	–	–	–	
1884	–	82,100	–	–	–	–	–	
1885	–	79,400	–	–	–	–	–	
1886	–	84,200	–	–	–	–	–	
1887	120,000	85,000	708.33	–	–	–	–	
1888	–	69,800	–	–	–	–	–	
1889	–	84,600	–	–	–	–	–	
1890	110,100	79,200	719.35	–	–	–	–	
1891	104,800	71,400	681.3	–	–	–	–	
1892	100,800	64,600	640.87	–	–	–	–	
1893	101,100	67,500	667.66	–	–	–	–	
1894	104,700	79,500	759.31	–	–	–	–	
1895	105,000	75,700	720.95	–	–	–	–	
1903–1912	79,477	79,500	1,000.29	–	–	–	–	
1909	78,800	75,000	951.78	–	–	–	–	
1909–1913	80,902	83,500	1,032.11	53,486	6,100	–	500,000–800,000	
1910	80,000	83,100	1,038.75	55,000	–	–	–	
1911	74,700	64,500	863.45	–	–	–	–	
1911–1922	–	85,457	–	–	–	–	–	
1912	85,400	90,800	1,063.23	48,000	–	–	–	
1913	86,600	90,900	1,049.65	–	–	–	550,000	
1914	87,200	97,400	1,116.97	68,000	–	–	688,000	
1915	–	–	–	29,000	–	–	627,000	
1916	–	–	–	35,068.8	–	–	282,000	
1917	–	–	–	28,467.8	–	–	398,000	
1918	–	–	–	–	–	–	410,000	
1919	91,863	94,299	1,026.51	35,000	–	–	557,000	
1920	95,101	97,889	1,023.32	65,000	–	–	430,000	
1921	84,984	82,899	975.47	26,840	1,848	–	470,000	
1922	53,014	50,400	950.69	60,831 (Note: The apparent overestimation of the export data for 1922, and possibly 1923, when compared to production and imports, may be due to the possible inclusion of tow, or even of finished products containing hemp, however this is not specified in the cited source.)	1,768	–	505,000	
1923	67,987	60,299	886.91	56,860	1,595	–	507,000	
1924	70,213	73,999	1,053.92	51,942	5,042	952,225	467,563	
1925	109,994	123,831	1,125.8	46,355.7	–	–	762,000	
1926	105,128	121,219	1,153.06	53,697.1	–	–	699,100	
1926–1929	–	94,900	–	76,300	–	–	–	
1926–1930	87,817	94,201	1,072.7	–	–	–	–	
1927	84,000	83,000	988.1	83,903.3	–	–	552,000	
1928	84,579	85,275	1,008.23	50,920.8	–	–	550,000	
1928–1938	73,529.41	75,000	1,020	–	–	–	420,000	
1929	89,000	87,303	980.93	53,990.5	–	–	561,000	
1930	87,000	91,353	1,050.03	49,357.7	–	–	494,000	
1930–1933	–	64,800	–	56,600	–	–	–	
1930–1934	–	64,410	–	–	–	–	–	
1931	64,750	53,600	827.8	48,207	–	–	393,000	
1931–1933	–	–	–	43,000	–	–	–	
1932	53,823	55,299	1,027.42	33,037.4	–	–	338,000	
1933	57,061	58,799	1,030.46	42,748.7	–	–	340,000	
1934	61,512	62,899	1,022.55	40,172.5	–	–	331,000	
1934–1938	–	88,800	–	42,500	–	–	–	
1935	67,582	66,399	982.5	–	–	–	342,000	
1936	74,867	87,257	1,165.49	–	–	–	392,000	
1936–1938	–	–	–	30,000	–	–	–	
1936–1939	85,000	110,000	1,294.12	–	–	–	–	
1936–1943	85,000	100,000	1,176.47	–	–	–	–	
1937	90,000	110,000	1,222.22	–	–	–	418,000	
1938	91,054	108,629	1,193.02	–	–	–	413,500	
1938–1942	–	119,748	–	–	–	–	–	
1939	–	–	–	–	–	–	416,000	
1940	86,850	109,200	1,257.34	–	–	–	300,000	
1941	102,500	135,300	1,320	–	–	–	–	
1942	87,007	100,698	1,157.36	–	–	–	–	
1943	70,415	73,028	1,037.11	–	–	–	–	
1944	52,204	55,792	1,068.73	–	–	–	–	
1945	–	–	–	–	–	–	280,000	
1946	61,174	68,726	1,123.45	–	–	–	–	
1946–1949	61,000	68,700	1,126.23	–	–	–	–	
1947	52,380.95	55,000	1,050	7,500	–	–	–	
1948–1952	58,000	69,300	1,194.83	31,300	–	–	–	
1948	–	76,800	–	20,000	–	–	–	
1949	–	70,500	–	36,400	–	–	–	
1950	56,561	67,873.2	1,200	34,800	–	–	–	
1951	51,277	65,121.7	1,270	42,100	–	–	–	
1952	56,222	67,700	1,204.15	22,900	–	–	–	
1953	54,073	63,500	1,174.34	–	–	–	–	
1954	33,909	42,010	1,238.9	33,706	–	–	–	
1955	33,709	42,080	1,248.33	14,197	2,600	–	–	
1956	36,503	42,750	1,171.14	12,519	6,100	–	–	
1956–1960	–	22,226	–	–	–	–	–	
1957	31,232	29,980	959.91	12,700	3,500	–	–	
1958	16,096	14,808	919.98	10,300	3,200	–	–	
1959	13,651	12,610	923.74	11,562	3,800	–	–	
1960	12,518	11,490	917.88	7,400	7,100	–	–	
1961	12,601	12,150	964.21	5,545.5	7,600	–	–	
1961–1965	10,000	12,000	1,200	–	–	633,000	364,000	
1962	14,605	14,107	965.9	–	11,730	–	–	
1963	12,213	14,170	1,160.24	–	–	–	–	
1964	8,765	9,570	1,091.84	–	–	–	–	
1965	8,858	9,800	1,106.34	3,500	7,900	–	–	
1966	9,410	11,320	1,202.98	–	–	–	355,000	
1967	6,066	7,210	1,188.59	–	–	–	349,000	
1968	4,002	4,750	1,186.91	–	–	–	299,000	
1969	1,861	2,135	1,147.23	–	–	–	300,000	
1969–1971	1,000	–	–	–	–	–	–	
1970	899	1,008	1,121.25	–	–	–	295,000	
1971	–	500	–	–	–	–	284,000	
1972	–	300	–	–	–	–	262,000	
1972–1973	–	–	–	–	–	–	260,000	
1973	270	300	1,111.11	–	8,238	439,000	254,000	
1974	–	–	–	–	–	–	247,000	
1975	–	–	–	–	–	–	249,000	
1976	–	–	–	–	–	–	244,000	
1979–1996	0	0	0	0	–	–	–	
1991	0	0	0	0	–	330,000	–	
1998	350	–	–	–	–	–	–	
2001	200	–	–	–	–	–	–	
2004	1,100 (Note: The cited source attributes the reported cultivated area to a dedicated Ministerial Decree and economic incentives, although the outlying figure could have been misreported.)	–	–	–	–	–	–	
2009	30	–	–	–	–	–	–	
2010	183	–	–	–	–	–	–	
2013	400	–	–	–	–	–	–	
2016	2,800	–	–	–	–	–	–	
2017	1,300	–	–	–	0.3	–	–	
2018	4,000	–	–	–	11	–	–	
2020	–	–	–	76	49	–	–	
2021	–	–	–	190	65	–	–	
2022	–	–	–	18	62	–	–	

== Republic of Italy ==
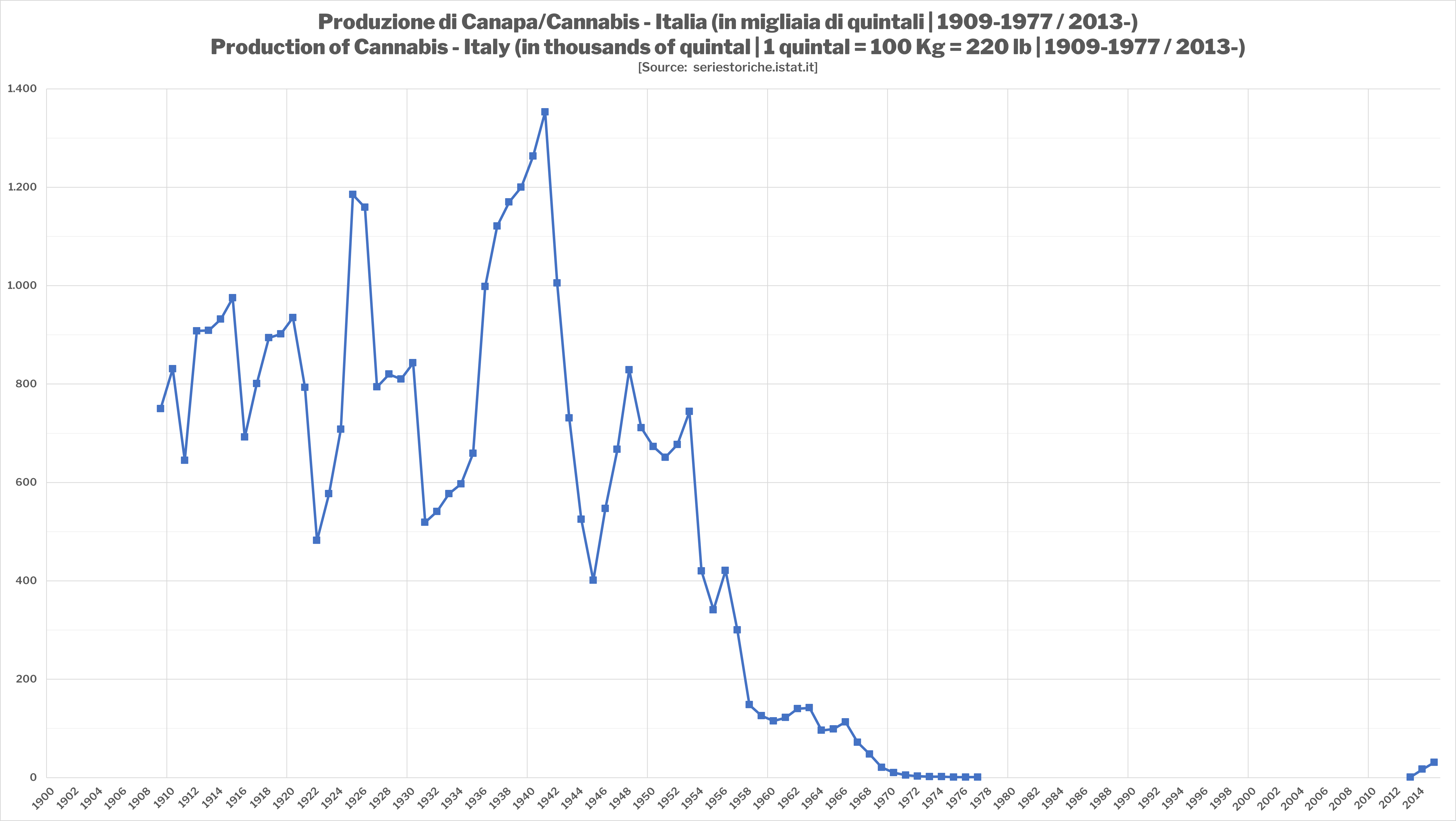
Italian hemp production statistics in thousands of quintals (i.e., hundreds of metric tons), as reported by ISTAT for the 1909–1977 and 2013–2015 periods.

The choice of Rome as the seat of this Congress underlines the importance in Europe of Italian hemp, renowned for centuries for its quality, a heritage maintained and developed by the patient effort of generations of growers and industrialists. But the time is no longer when sons could calmly continue the work of their fathers without worrying about the vicissitudes of the international market. Competition from other natural or artificial textile fibers, the development of the mechanical industry, the internal legislation of each country and that of other nations constitute all factors which considerably influence the interests of your Confederation.
Note. Excerpt translated from a speech by Pope Pius XII, addressing the participants of the Fifth International Assembly on Flax and Hemp, on 4 October 1954.

The decline of hemp production in Italy came with the economic boom of the 1950s and 1960s, during which time synthetic fibers (e.g. nylon) were introduced into the market and the international campaign against narcotics intensified. In particular, industrial cannabis almost completely disappeared from most Western European countries by the end of the 1960s, with France and Spain being the only two countries which basically never interrupted the cultivation of hemp, although they still had significantly different and volatile trends. This significant decline is mainly attributed to competition from both industrial fabrics and cotton for textiles, metallic materials for naval ropes, as well as Manila and jute for packaging during long sea voyages. Other contributing factors include a tightening of regulations for textile hemp, increases in the cost of labor that could not be easily replaced by mechanization, and the significant environmental impact of the retting tanks.

In May 1959, possible measures aimed at counteracting the decline in hemp cultivation were proposed during the World Congress of Agricultural Research, at the FAO Headquarters in Rome, by Mario Bonvicini, Director of the Istituto di Allevamento Vegetale per la Cerealicoltura (i.e., Institute of Plant Breeding for Cereal Cultivation) in Bologna. The proposed measures included research being conducted at the international level, genetic improvement of hemp crops, and mechanization, with the latter being the most important one, especially in regard to the labor-intensive maceration process. However, director Bonvicini recognized that none of the industrial maceration attempts had yet obtained a fiber of comparable quality to that obtained from rustic maceration, and as a result it was not possible to ensure the long-term viability of the crop. Furthermore, no supporting policies were implemented for the declining sector, even after the Constitutional Court ruled on 4 April 1963 that the strict regulatory system for hemp cultivation, a legacy of Fascist corporatism, was unconstitutional. To the contrary, as part of its drug prohibition policy, Italy endorsed all the three major drug control treaties, namely the Single Convention on Narcotic Drugs of 1961, the Convention on Psychotropic Substances of 1971, and the United Nations Convention Against Illicit Traffic in Narcotic Drugs and Psychotropic Substances of 1988, and soon after the passage of the anti-drug Cossiga Law 685/75 of 1975, hemp fields in Italy all but disappeared.

=== Hemp farming techniques ===
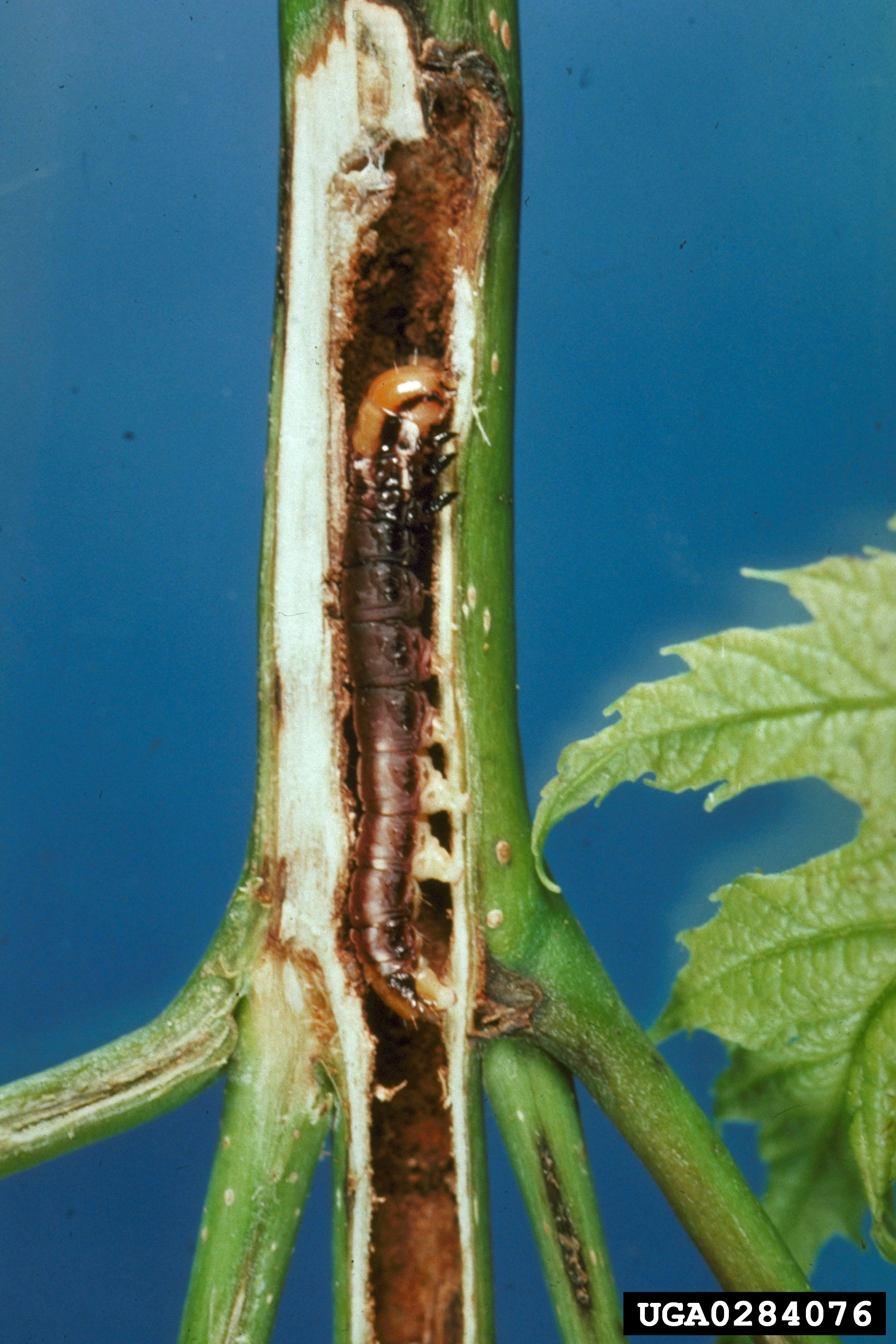
A plant stem being severely damaged by a stalk borer.

Canape cresce dappertutto, ma la Canape à vendere ne in cielo, ne in terra, ma nel letame.
Note. Old common Romagnol saying on the need for fertilizers to obtain high-quality hemp, meaning Hemp grows everywhere, but hemp fit for sale [grows] neither in heaven, nor in earth, rather in manure.

In the 1950s, the cultivation of hemp in Italy was concentrated in the traditional areas of Emilia, Polesine, and Campania. At the time, the hemp farming and processing sector was reported to employ as many as 200.000 people, including more than 160.000 farm workers and more than 30.000 industrial workers. At the agricultural stage, the hemp production cycle committed every member of the family of a mezzadro, and it generally involved soil preparation and manuring in November, hoeing and sowing between February and March, weeding in April, harvesting and maceration in August, and schutching and further processing in September. The most significant threat to the crops during their entire development was posed by both strong winds and hail, which could severely damage the hemp stalks, thus affecting both the quantity and the quality of the produced fiber; and against which no effective defensive measure could be devised.

Similarly to all rotational crops, hemp fields required a significant amount of manure, usually between 50 t/ha (20 long ton/acre) and 70 t/ha (28 long ton/acre), although in areas where the latter was not readily available, it could still be substituted with a particular herbal mix, known as pascone in Campania, made of favette, barley, and oat. Prior to sowing, the soil enrichment was completed with a significant amount of chemical fertilizers, which could vary from the traditional simple mixtures of mineral superphosphate, ammonium sulfate, and potassium sulfate; to the more complex substances including the NPK fertilizers 11–22–16 and 06–12–09, PK fertilizers, and diammonium phosphate. Once the hemp plants reached about 10 cm (3.9 in) in height, ammonium nitrate was used to help their critical early development, after which hoes were used for soil aeration and weed control. A further nitrogen-based enrichment was conducted once the hemp plants reached between 30 cm (11.8 in) and 40 cm (15.7 in) in height, in particular by using the highly concentrated and granulated urea, while a second round of manual tilling was carefully performed prior to the crop becoming too tall. The fast growth of the hemp plants to their maximum height was also encouraged by the densely planted seeds, which would prompt the individual plants to fiercely compete for sunlight.

Beside soil enrichment, farmers also used aldrin to kill off all ground-based insects that could harm the crops, especially during their early stages, including elateridae, cockchafer larvae, agrotis larvae, and field crickets. The manually-spread fertilizers and insecticides were both buried into the soil through dedicated tilling machines, which would also soften the earth in preparation for the sowing. The main pest for the hemp plants was the european corn borer, whose larvae would penetrate the stalks during the months of April and May, to develop within the medullary channel. This process would cause severe internal damage to the crops, especially following the imaginal stage, with the ruined stalks being easily broken by the wind. To stop the development of these pests, farmers used to spray the hemp crops with a mixture of DDT-based insecticides, water, and organophosphorus compounds. Other noteworthy parasites included the Tylenchus devastator, which prevented the normal development of the plants; and the Altica oleracea, which gnawed on the tender leaves. In regard to cryptogamic infections, particularly significant were the Ascobacterium luteum, which caused bacteriosis; the Botrytis felisiana, which especially impacted the hemp fields in the territory of Ferrara; and the Peronospora cannabina, which affected the leaves. Finally, notable infesting plants included the Orobanche ramosa, whose shoots would develop from the numerous seeds at the expense of the hemp crop, although they were less effective against the Carmagnola variety; the Cuscuta europaea, which was contrasted by destroying and burning the affected areas; and the Polygonum convolvulus, which caused only little damage while twining around the hemp plants, and could be easily prevented with a more accurate hoeing and weeding.

=== Hemp production decline ===
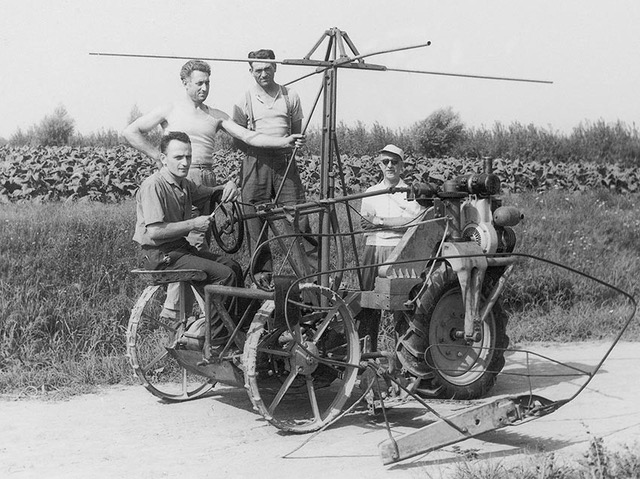
Machine designed by Ulisse Ferri (seated), for mowing and processing hemp plants in the 1950s.

Tutto di canapa mi voglio vestire.
Note. Quotation attributed to Italian performer Totò, meaning I want to dress all in hemp.

In the 1950s, while the Soviet Union remained the biggest producer of hemp in the world, Italy was overtaken by India in the second place, and then by Yugoslavia in the third place. The production of hemp in Asia in general, and India in particular, did not yet show significant oscillations since switching to more profitable crops was not yet feasible. Similarly, in Yugoslavia and Eastern Europe (e.g. Poland, Hungary, and Romania) the production trends remained more or less stationary, in part due to labor costs not yet being a limiting factor, and thus the produced hemp constituted significant competition. Nevertheless, the total cultivation area in Europe was ever-shrinking, namely declining by 45.3% between 1961 and 1973, with the regional reduction peaking at 97.3% in Italy. In particular, hemp fields in the Soviet Union were reduced from an average of 663,000 ha (6,630 km^{2}; 2,560 mi^{2}) between 1934 and 1938, to an average of 556,000 ha (5,560 km^{2}; 2,147 mi^{2}) between 1948 and 1952, and then to 400,000 ha (4,000 km^{2}; 1,544 mi^{2}) in 1958; while in Italy the cultivation area declined from an average of 85,000 ha (850.0 km^{2}; 328.2 mi^{2}) between 1936 and 1939, to 16,000 ha (160.0 km^{2}; 61.8 mi^{2}) in 1958.

Global exports of hemp fiber were also declining, namely dropping by 46% from an average of 70,000 t between 1948 and 1952, to 38,000 t in 1958. In particular, Italy was the biggest exporter between 1948 and 1952 with 22,000 t of fiber and 9,000 t of tow, followed by India with 22,000 t of fiber, and then by Yugoslavia with 5,000 t of fiber and 7,000 t of tow; however, India was the biggest exporter in 1958 with 11,200 t of fiber, followed by Yugoslavia with 10,600 t, and then by Italy with 10,300 t. The main importers of Italian hemp were West Germany, Switzerland, Czechoslovakia, France, Austria, and the United Kingdom, while Italy started importing hemp mainly from Yugoslavia and India.

In 1973, Italy was the biggest importer with 8,238 t, which accounted for 25.8% of the global demand, while no significant export was reported, considering that the total cultivation area was reduced to just 270 ha (2.70 km^{2}; 1.04 mi^{2}), producing 300 t of fiber. The decline of hemp production in Italy was more pronounced in the North, while it was slower in the South, but it was nevertheless irreversible. In particular, Campania accounted for 77% of the national cultivation area in 1958, followed at a significant distance by Emilia-Romagna and Piedmont, with the latter being noteworthy primarily for the production of hemp seeds rather than fiber. The cultivation of hemp was prohibited in Italy by 1980, with the exception of very few and strictly controlled cases, which caused the germplasm of some old Italian varieties to be lost, and the development of new machinery for the cultivation and processing of hemp to be abandoned. In 1991, Italy was still reported as the biggest importer of hemp, while the national production completely ceased by that time. Similarly, world production continued to decline, with the total cultivation area reduced to 330,000 ha (3,300 km^{2}; 1,274 mi^{2}), while India and China both surpassed the Soviet Union, which was still a major producer nonetheless, to contend for the position of biggest producer.

=== Drug prohibition ===
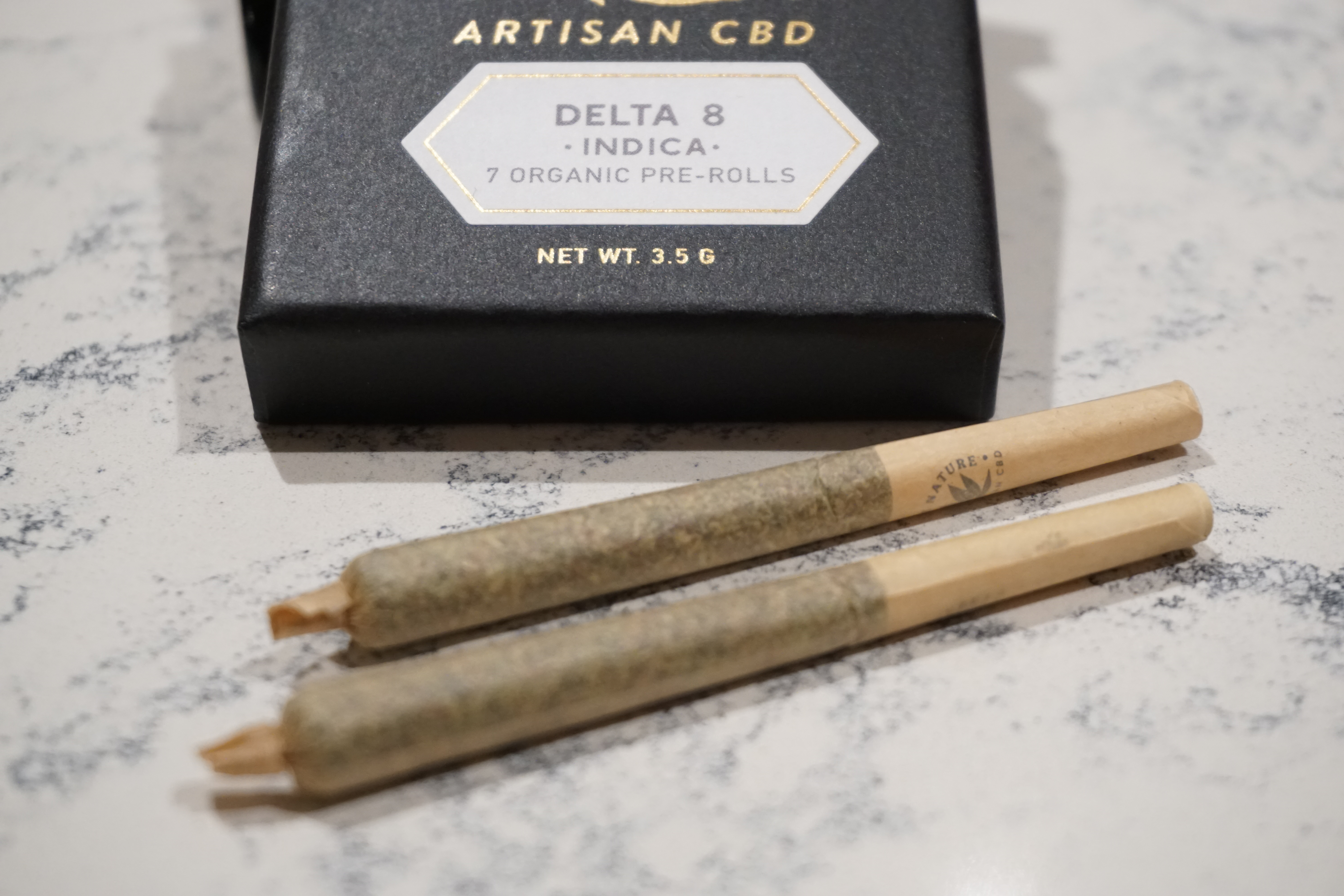
CBD pre-rolled joints infused with hemp flower and delta-8 THC.

The Law 685/75 introduced the concept of modest quantity to distinguish those who merely consume drugs from those who push them, with the latter being the ones whom the law was supposed to punish, while previously no such distinction was made. Nevertheless, with the lack of a specific definition for what constitutes a modest quantity of a certain drug, the matter was left to the discretion of the judges, and thus the Supreme Court of Cassation presented guidelines so that judges would reach consistent verdicts. In particular, the guidelines established that a modest quantity did not necessarily refer to a particular quantity of narcotics and that, before reaching a verdict, a court had to clarify the level of drug dependence of the defendant, and to scientifically establish the nature and composition of the confiscated drugs, as well as the average quantity of active principles that could be obtained from them. However, the so-called Iervolino-Vassalli Law, which was included in the Presidential Decree DPR 309/90 of 1990, substituted the concept of modest quantity with the one of average daily dose, where the maximum quantities that could be legally consumed were defined for each drug by Ministerial Decree.

In the context of the DPR 309/90, which covers the discipline of narcotics and psychotropic substances, prevention, treatment, and rehabilitation of the related stages of substance dependence, a mere drug abuser is considered to be a patient in need of rehabilitation, and therefore not subjected to penal system, but they can still be subjected to administrative penalties. Such penalties include the suspension of their driver's licence, gun licence, and passport, for a period of at least one month and at most one year. Nevertheless, the Radical Party led by Marco Pannella successfully campaigned for a referendum that repealed criminal penalties for the personal use of soft drugs in 1993, and thus the concept of average daily dose was eliminated, while the judicial discretion on a case-by-case basis was re-established. In 1996, a second ballot initiative was launched by Rita Bernardini and Mauro Sabatano, that aimed at the decriminalization of the cultivation of marijuana by removing references to Indian hemp plants from the relevant articles of the DPR 309/90. However, even though the request had been declared legitimate by the Supreme Court of Cassation on 13 December 1996, in terms of the validity of the collected signatures, the Constitutional Court ruled on 30 January 1997 that the ballot question was inadmissible, since the proposed changes would have violated international obligations, as defined in the aforementioned UN Conventions of 1961 and 1988. In particular, according to Article 75 of the Constitution, general referendums are allowed for repealing a law or part of it, when they are requested by either 500 thousand voters or five Regional Councils, while neither propositional referendums nor referendums on a law regulating taxes, the budget, amnesty or pardon, or a law ratifying an international treaty are recognised.

In 2006, the controversial Fini-Giovanardi Law 49/06 removed the distinction between hard and soft drugs, and thus made the possession of marijuana and hashish punishable as harshly as the possession of heroin or cocaine, until it was eventually struck down by the Constitutional Court in 2014. The decision to rule the Law 49/06 unconstitutional was based not on its content, but rather on the way the initial bill was passed into law, since it had been attached to a measure concerning the 2006 Winter Olympics in Turin through a procedure that violated Article 77 of the Constitution. In any case, the Law 49/06 tripled sentences for selling, cultivating, and possessing cannabis from 2–6 years to 6–20 years, thus leading to prison overcrowding, with 40% of inmates being jailed for drug-related crimes, although cannabis consumption was never criminalized. Furthermore, the Law 49/06 introduced the criterion of quantifying the amount of active principle within the confiscated drugs, as well as a zero-tolerance policy regarding behaviors and circumstances which could indicate drug trafficking. As a consequence, a crime would be committed if the quantity of active principle was above the limits set by the Ministerial Table, which for cannabis was established at 500 mg, corresponding to a gross weight of about 5 g, or about 15–20 joints.

Since 2014, the main legislation regarding narcotics is the Lorenzin Decree-Law 36/14, which establishes five Tables of Substances published by the Ministry of Health. The various controlled substances are included in their respective tables based on their assessed harmfulness, and cannabis is currently placed in the second one, along with its derivatives. Therefore, certain legal sanctions regarding the trade and consumption of cannabis are maintained, although they are less harsh than they were before. In particular, the possession of cannabis for personal use is currently decriminalized and subjected to fines and the confiscation of personal documents like passports and driver's licenses, while its unlicensed cultivation and sale are still illegal, and punishable with a prison sentence between 2 and 6 years, as well as a fine between €26,000 (29,000 US$) and €260,000 (290,000 US$).

=== EU regulations and incentives ===
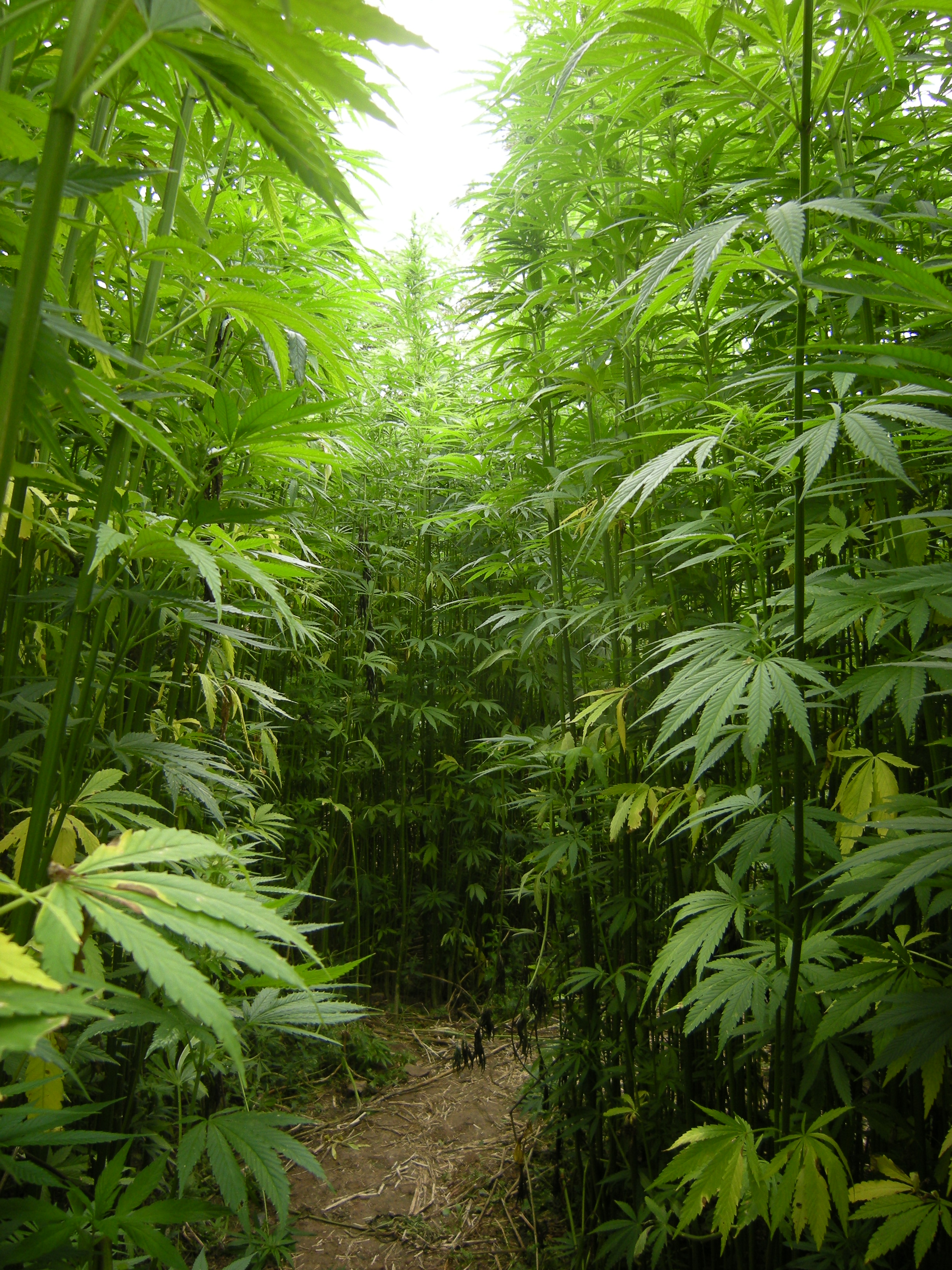
A hemp field in Côtes-d'Armor, Brittany, France.

Despite renewed interest in hemp cultivation from the early 1990s onwards, when it started being promoted throughout the European Union, industrial cannabis remained a niche crop for more than 20 years afterwards, with an estimated cultivation area between 10,000 ha (100.0 km^{2}; 38.6 mi^{2}) and 15,000 ha (150.0 km^{2}; 57.9 mi^{2}) in the entire Union. In particular, in 1994 and 1995, the only cannabis plants officially cultivated in Italy were the ones grown at the State research agency ENEA, under the strict control of the authorities, while research projects that were started in Emilia and Aosta Valley for educational purposes had been shut down.

Furthermore, following the cessation of hemp production in Italy, concerns were raised in the European Parliament in 1998, over the recovery and protection of the remaining endangered Italian varieties, as well as the potentially permanent loss of the biodiversity and economic benefits previously derived from the cultivation of hemp. The subsequent response from the European Commission referred to Council Regulation (EC) 1467/94 of 20 June 1994, whose objectives are to help ensure and improve the conservation, characterisation, documentation, evaluation and use of potentially valuable plant and animal genetic resources in the Community. At the same time, Italy started a program that aimed at the reintroduction of the cultivation of hemp in the country, by issuing yearly permits for hemp fields covering 1,000 ha (10.0 km^{2}; 3.9 mi^{2}), although it initially received mixed results due to the underperforming commercial use.

Nevertheless, further interest in hemp was prompted by Council Regulation (EC) 1251/99 of 17 May 1999, and subsequent implementing regulations, which established a support scheme for farmers growing specific arable crops, from a list that included industrial hemp. Following the establishment of these regulations, the area dedicated to hemp cultivation in the entire European Union increased by 75.1%, from 19,970 ha (199.7 km^{2}; 77.1 mi^{2}) in 2015 to 34,960 ha (349.6 km^{2}; 135.0 mi^{2}) in 2019, while the production of hemp increased by 62.4%, from 94,120 to 152,820 t. In particular, with the enlargement of the EU toward the countries of Eastern Europe, the Union became 3rd in the world in terms of hemp cultivation area, after China and Canada. At present, France is the largest hemp producer in Europe, accounting for more than 70% of the EU production, followed by the Netherlands at 10%, and Austria at 4%.

In regard to Italy, among the problems faced by Italian farmers at the time was the difficulty in finding the appropriate hemp varieties and growing techniques for the local terrains, considering that the almost complete disappearance of the old Italian varieties prompted the farmers to rely on seeds imported from France. Moreover, to qualify for EU grants, the grown plants needed to have a THC content at most equal to 0.2%, which could be difficult to achieve, especially when the plants are allowed to grow until the seeding stage. Furthermore, to make the operation commercially viable, farmers and technicians had to determine the properties of the different sections of the hemp plants; develop effective mechanical processes to clean and separate the various parts of the stem; and assess the quality of the produced fiber, when compared to the readily available French varieties, especially in regard to their most valuable applications in the textile market.

In 2014, Italian hemp varieties were tested as potential candidates for the possible reintroduction of hemp in the United States, after all existing American varieties were eradicated as a consequence of the war on drugs. The research was conducted at the Agricultural Experiment Station of the University of Kentucky, as well as several university-affiliated privately owned test sites within the State, after the then Kentucky Agriculture Commissioner James Comer negotiated the release of a shipment of Italian hemp seeds, that had been confiscated by the DEA in Louisville. The local soil and climate proved favorable for the test crops, which reached over 8 ft (2.4 m) in height within three months of planting, and this was seen as an opportunity to create jobs in the agriculture sector, following the decline in the tobacco production caused by the ending of Federal subsidies.

== See also ==
- Antiprohibitionists on Drugs
- Cannabis in Italy
- History of cannabis
- History of medical cannabis
- Timeline of cannabis law
