= Campanian Ignimbrite eruption =

Volcanic eruption about 40,000 years ago

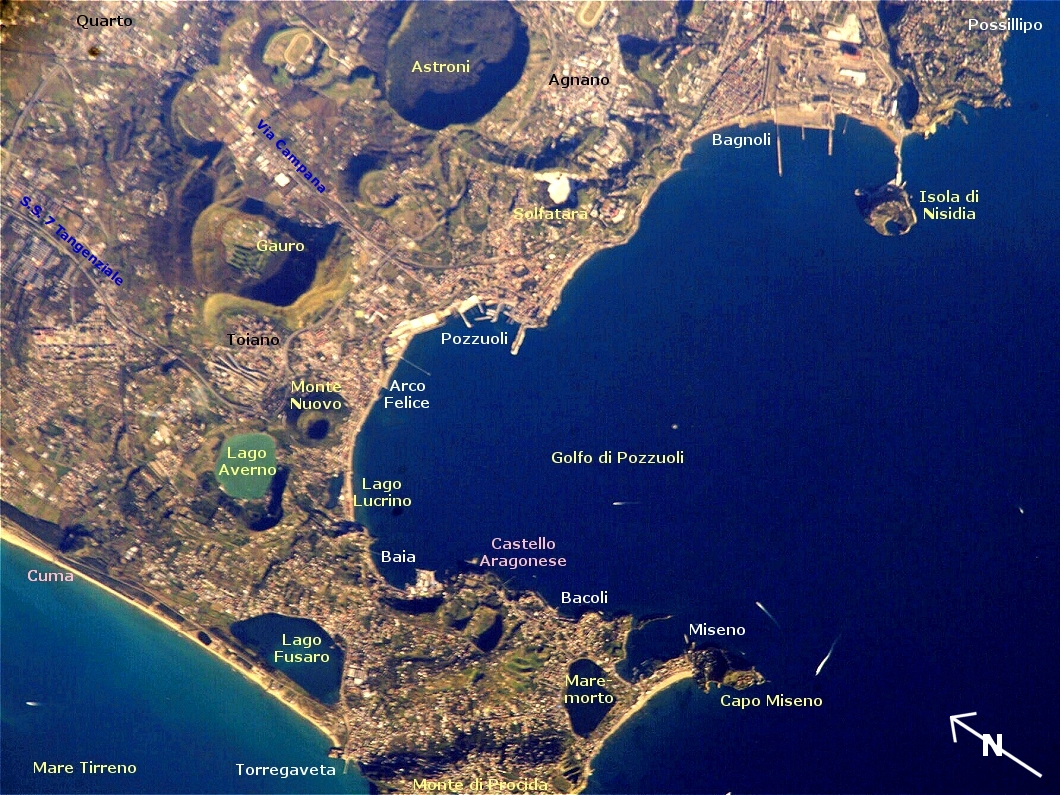
- Volcano: Phlegraean Fields
- Date: c. 39,500 years ago
- Type: Plinian eruption
- Location: Naples, Campania, Italy; 40.827°N 14.139°E
- Volume: 181–265 km^{3} (43–64 mi^{3})
- VEI: 7

Maps
- Location of eruption

The Campanian Ignimbrite eruption (CI, also CI eruption) was a major volcanic eruption in the Mediterranean during the late Quaternary, classified 7 on the Volcanic Explosivity Index (VEI). The event has been attributed to the Archiflegreo volcano, the 12-by-15-kilometre-wide (7.5 mi × 9.3 mi) caldera of the Phlegraean Fields, located 20 km (12 mi) west of Mount Vesuvius under the western outskirts of the city of Naples and the Gulf of Pozzuoli, Italy. It was the largest explosive volcanic event in Europe in the past 200,000 years, and the largest eruption of Campi Flegrei caldera.

Estimates of the date and magnitude of the eruption(s), and the amount of ejected material have varied considerably during several centuries the site has been studied. This applies to most significant volcanic events that originated in the Campanian Plain, as it is one of the most complex volcanic structures in the world. However, continued research, advancing methods, and accumulation of volcanological, geochronological, and geochemical data have improved the dates' accuracy.

The most recent results by radiocarbon and argon–argon dating are, respectively, 39,220 to 39,705 calendar year BP and 39850±140 year BP. The estimated eruptive volume in dense-rock equivalent (DRE) is in the range of 181–265 km^{3} (43–64 mi^{3}), and tephra has dispersed over an area of around 3,000,000 km^{2} (1,200,000 sq mi), commonly referred to as the ash horizon Y-5. The accuracy of these numbers is of significance for marine geologists, climatologists, palaeontologists, paleo-anthropologists and researchers of related fields as the event coincides with a number of global and local phenomena, such as widespread discontinuities in archaeological sequences, climatic oscillations and biocultural modifications.

== Etymology ==
The term Campanian refers to the Campanian volcanic arc located mostly but not exclusively in the region of Campania in southern Italy that stretches over a subduction zone created by the convergence of the African and Eurasian plates. It should not be confused with the Late Cretaceous stage Campanian.

The word ignimbrite was coined by New Zealand geologist Patrick Marshall from Latin ignis (fire) and imber (shower)) and -ite. It means the deposits that form as a result of a pyroclastic eruption.

== Background ==
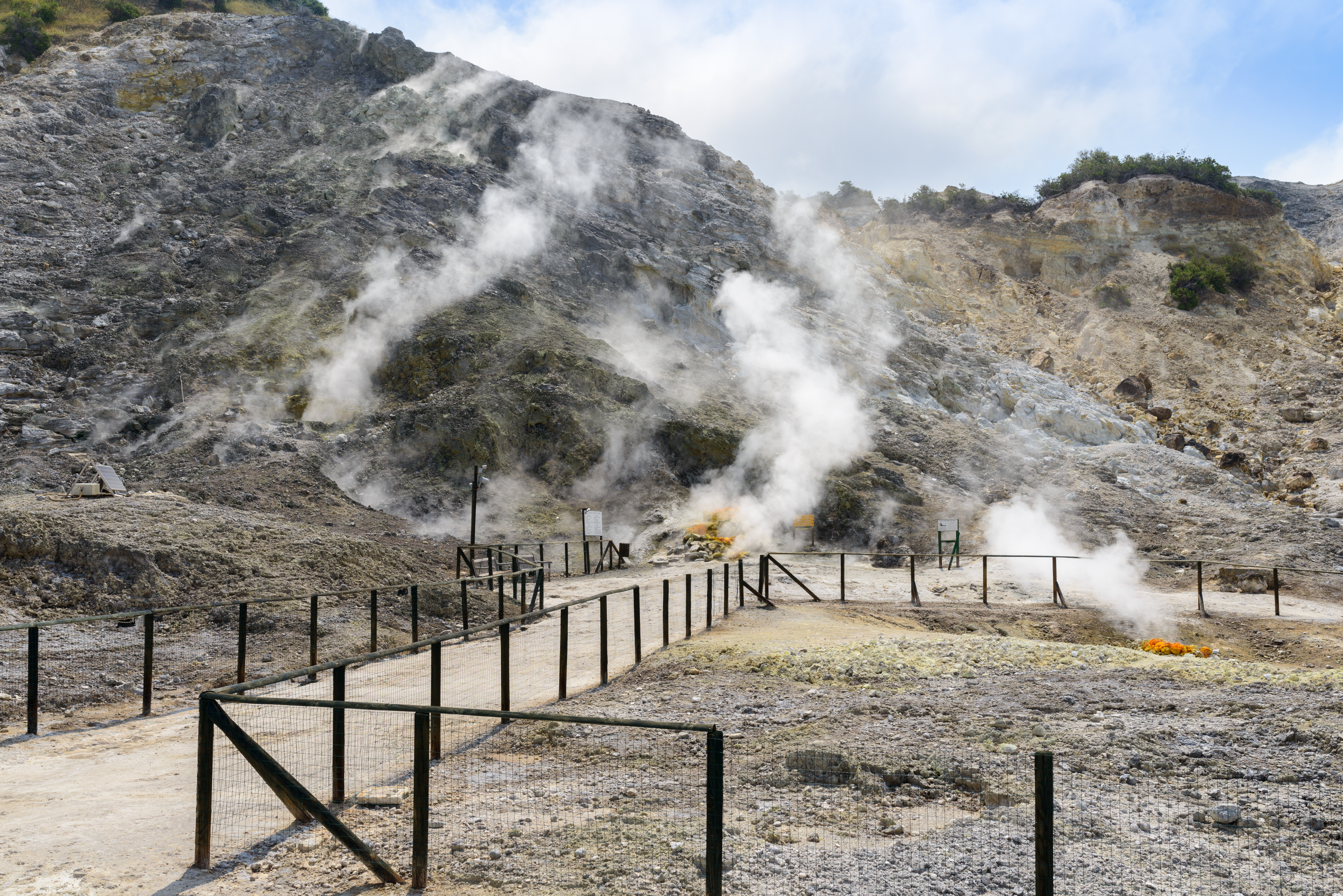
Solfatara Pozzuoli

The Phlegraean Fields (Italian: Campi Flegrei "burning fields" (Note: The term Campi Flegrei is mixed Latin and ancient Greek, indicating that the volcanic nature of the area has been well known in antiquity.)) caldera is a nested structure with a diameter of around 12 km × 15 km (7.5 mi × 9.3 mi). It is composed of the older Campanian Ignimbrite caldera, the younger Neapolitan Yellow Tuff caldera and widely scattered sub-aerial and submarine vents from which the most recent eruptions have originated. The Fields sit upon a Pliocene – Quaternary Extensional domain with faults, that run North-East to South-West and North-West to South-East from the margin of the Apennine thrust belt. The sequence of deformation has been subdivided into three periods.

=== Phlegraean Periods ===
- The First Period, which includes the Campanian Ignimbrite Eruption, was the most decisive era in the Phlegraean Fields' geologic history. Beginning more than 40,000 years ago as the external caldera formed, subsequent caldera collapses and repeated volcanic activity took place within a limited area.
- During the Second Period, the smaller Neapolitan Yellow Tuff eruption (Neapolitan Yellow Tuff or NYT) took place around 15,000 years ago.
- Eruptions of the Third Period occurred during three intervals between 15,000 and 9,500 years ago, 8,600–8,200 years ago and from 4,800 to 3,800 years ago.

The structure's magma chamber remains active as there are solfataras, hot springs, gas emissions and frequent episodes of large-scale up- and downlift ground deformation (Bradyseism) do occur.

In 2008 it was discovered that the Phlegraean Fields and Mount Vesuvius have a common magma chamber at a depth of 10 km (6.2 mi).

The region's volcanic nature has been recognized since Antiquity, investigated and studied for many centuries. Methodical scientific research began in the late 19th century. The yellow tuff stone was extensively quarried for centuries, which left large underground cavities that served as aqueducts and cisterns for the collection of rain water.

In 2016 Italian Volcanologists announced plans to drill a probe 3 km (1.9 mi) deep into the Phlegraean Fields several years after the 2008 Campi Flegrei Deep Drilling Project which had aimed to drill a 3.5 km (2.2 mi) diagonal borehole in order to bring up rock samples and install seismic equipment. The project was suspended in 2010 due to safety problems.

== Eruptive sequence ==
Diagram of a Plinian eruption. (key: 1. Ash plume; 2. Magma conduit; 3. Volcanic ash rain; 4. Layers of lava and ash; 5. Stratum; 6. Magma chamber)

The CI eruption has been interpreted as the largest volcanic eruption of the past 200,000 years in Europe. The eruption started with an intense Plinian phase, succeeded by a sequence of voluminous pyroclastic density currents with co-ignimbrite plumes. Both phases generated high eruptive columns, culminating in the widespread deposition of the Y-5 layer.

=== Plinian phase ===
The distribution of basal Plinian fallout strongly suggests that the onset of the eruption occurred in the northeastern sector of Campi Flegrei. This phase is supplied by the uppermost, most evolved trachytic magma of the chamber.

A detailed attempt to reconstruct this phase through direct field measurements recognized the evolution of the Plinian column through five units of fall deposits. The eruption first reached a column height of 29 km (18 mi) and then peaked at 39 km (24 mi), and during the latest stage, the top of the plume waned to 26 km (16 mi). The entire Plinian eruption lasted about 20 hours and emitted 7.8 km^{3} (1.9 mi^{3}) of magma. Another attempt at reconstruction by numerical simulation shows a different Plinian process. The eruptive column rose to 44 km (27 mi), and the entire phase was completed within 4 hours with a magma volume of 23 km^{3} (5.5 mi^{3}).

Plinian tephra is present in deposits to distances of at least 1,400 km (870 mi) and between 130 km (81 mi) and 900 km (560 mi) constitutes 35–45% of the Y-5 deposit.

=== Ignimbrite phase ===
The Plinian phase was followed by six main units of impressive pyroclastic density currents spreading over an area of 30,000 km^{2} (12,000 sq mi) and managing to surmount mountain ridges up to 1,000-metre-high (3,300 ft), extinguishing all life within a radius of about 100 km (62 mi).

The collapse of Plinian column due to an increase of the mass eruption rate produced the first ignimbrite unit, the Unconsolidated Stratified Ash Flow. Subsequently, the eruption advances into the climactic stage, generating three ignimbrite units, namely the voluminous Welded Grey Ignimbrite, Coarse Pumice Flow, and Lower Pumice Flow Unit. Collectively, these three units constitute the bulk of the CI eruption. The Y-5 co-ignimbrite ash dispersals to the southeast and northeast within 1,000 km (620 mi) of Campi Flegrei are associated with these first four units of pyroclastic density currents.

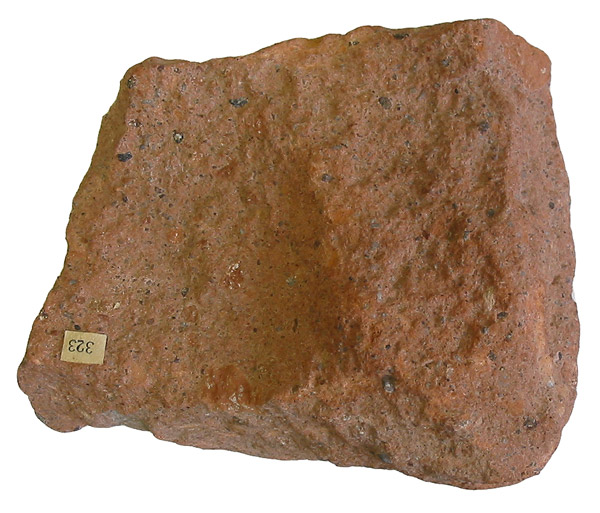
Ignimbrite

After the eruption of the first four units, the majority of the CI magma had been expelled, resulting in the collapse of the caldera. The collapse triggered a new phase of eruption of Breccia/Spatter Unit and Upper Pumice Flow Unit. The magma was sourced from the lowermost, less evolved portions of the chamber. These two units represented the last stage of eruption and were only emplaced as very proximal deposits along the caldera rim. Most of the ultra-distal dispersal > 1,500 km (930 mi) was associated with this stage.

Calculations of exposed and inferred thickness and area of pyroclastic density currents yield a total ignimbrite volume of 60–83 km^{3} (14–20 mi^{3}) of magma. Consequently, the DRE volume of co-ignimbrite ash based on vitric loss method falls in the range of 116–155 km^{3} (28–37 mi^{3}) DRE. The overall magma volume expelled during this phase amounts to 179–243 km^{3} (43–58 mi^{3}).

Numerical simulation obtained a lower estimate of 62 km^{3} (15 mi^{3}) DRE for co-ignimbrite ash.

== Global impact ==
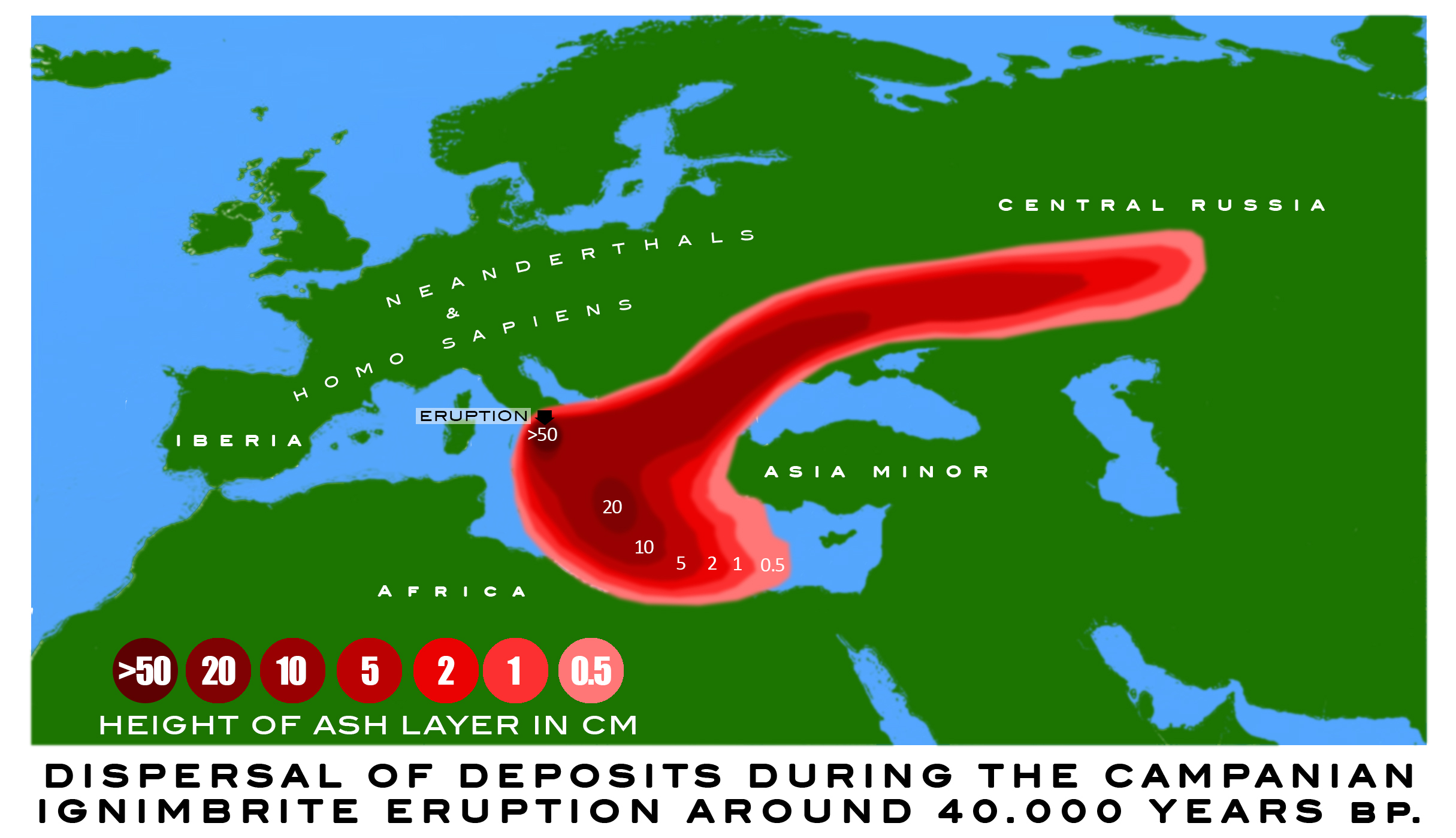
Graphic of deposit dispersal during the eruption

The Ar/Ar age of the CI eruption has been determined to 39850±140 year BP. The ^{14}C age of charred wood embedded in Welded Grey Ignimbrite has been calibrated to 39,220—39,705 year BP. The two ages of the CI eruption disagree on a scale of centuries, suggesting that the dating uncertainties of Ar/Ar or ^{14}C are underestimated. Nonetheless, the temporal proximity of CI eruption, Middle to Upper Paleolithic transition, Neanderthal disappearance, and the onset of Heinrich event 4 (HE-4) drew considerable scholarly attention.

=== Relation with Heinrich event 4 ===
In climatostratigraphy, the CI eruption occurred near the onset of a millennial-scale cold stadial that encompassed HE-4. Francesco G. Fedele and his team postulated that the volcanic winter of the CI eruption triggered HE-4, which saw the summer sea surface temperature plummeting by 3–6 °C along the Iberian margin and by 5 °C in the westernmost Mediterranean. However, this connection has been refuted by high-resolution paleoclimate records, which clearly indicate that the Y-5 layer postdates the onset of HE-4 by 700–800 years.

=== Volcanic winter hypothesis ===
Petrological studies show that the magma of the CI eruption contained 50–250 million tones of sulfur dioxide and is expected to have caused a severe volcanic winter on top of already cool climate of HE-4 by injecting stratospheric sulfur aerosols. Simulations of the CI eruption by the Community Earth System Model find that temperature anomalies in Western Europe reach –2 °C to –4 °C during the year following the eruption, and the peak cooling and acid deposition lasted one to two years.

To assess the volcanic winter using climate proxies, significant effort has been invested in directly detecting the sulfate signal of the CI eruption in polar ice cores, but these attempts have turned out to be fruitless. Several large sulfate peaks occurring near the onset of HE-4 have been tentatively attributed to the CI eruption, but it requires a well-characterized tephra find in the ice cores to ensure that the sulfate peak is indeed associated with the CI.

=== Relation with Neanderthal disappearance ===
Some hypothesized that a connection may exist between the CI eruption and the disappearance of Neanderthals in Europe. It is suggested that the CI eruption triggered a bio-cultural revolution, enabling modern humans to outcompete the Neanderthals. This has been rejected based on stratigraphical evidence that the cultural transition from Mousterian to Uluzzian or Proto-Aurignacian (indicating the replacement of Neanderthals by modern humans in archaeology) began below the CI tephra. In 2021, the timing of Neanderthal extinction has also been re-calibrated to 40700±200 year BP, thus predating the CI eruption.

=== Relation with Middle to Upper Paleolithic transition ===
At many European archaeological sites, Uluzzian and Proto-Aurignacian, transitional techno-complexes between the Middle and the Upper Paleolithic, are directly capped by the CI tephra. Radiocarbon dating of the Proto-Aurignacian or Uluzzian layers yielded ages statistically indistinguishable or barely older than the radiocarbon age of the CI eruption. Based on stratigraphic sequences alone, the CI eruption appeared synchronous with the end of the Proto-Aurignacian and Uluzzian cultures, and the emergence of the Early Aurignacian adaptation appeared immediately after the eruption. This has been interpreted as indicating that the impact of the CI eruption led to the abrupt end of the pre-CI lithic traditions and triggered the following Early Aurignacian revolution. However, when probability curves of boundary transition are taken into account, the Early Aurignacian culture emerged in some regions of Europe prior to the CI eruption, thus precluding the CI eruption from being the instigator of the Early Aurignacian.

== See also ==
- Supervolcano
