= Agnano =

Crater and Suburb of Naples

Coordinates: 40°50′41″N 14°08′59″E

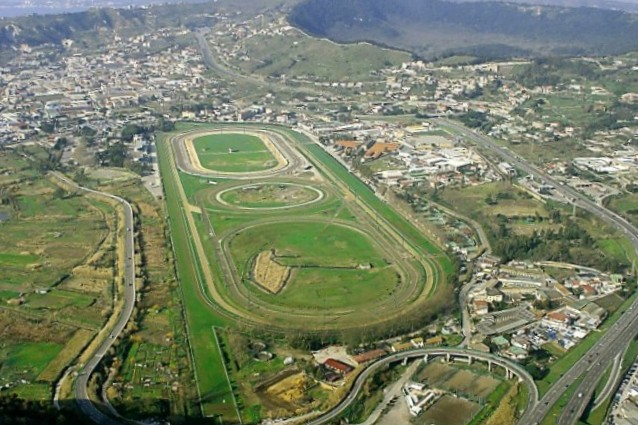
Agnano Racecourse showing the crater edges at the rear

Agnano is a suburb of Naples, Italy, situated southwest of the city in the Campi Flegrei region. It was popular among both ancient Greeks and Romans and was famed for its hot sulphurous springs.

== History ==
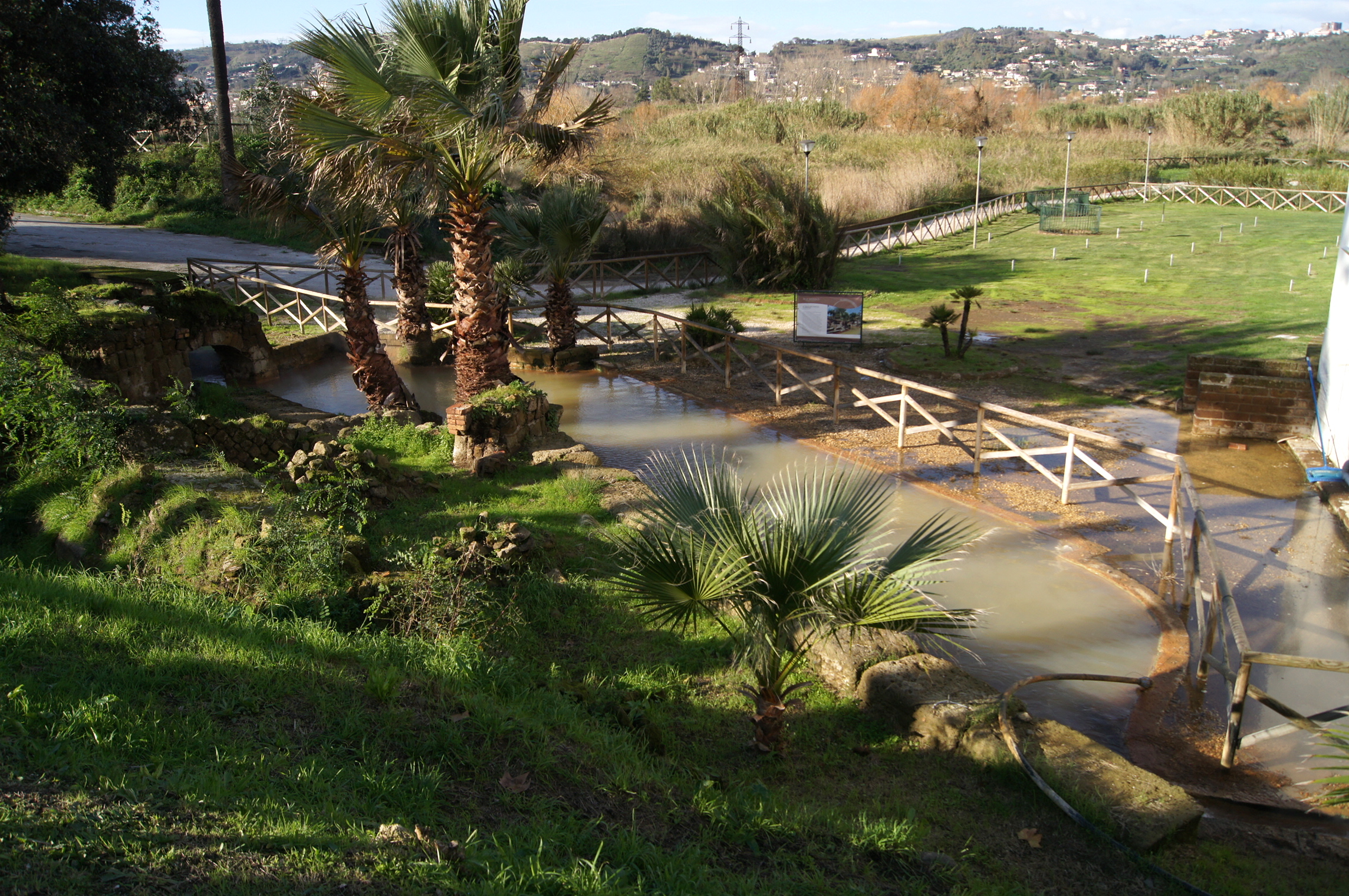
Greek/Roman Thermal baths

Lake Agnano formed in the Middle Ages in the volcanic crater but was drained in 1870 to increase arable land and reduce the habitat of the Anopheles mosquito, which carries the malaria parasite. The crater is now home to the Agnano hippodrome and the town.

After World War II, Agnano was home to the U.S. Naval Support Activity consisting of the U.S. Naval Hospital, administrative offices, barracks, and two Department of Defense Education Activity schools: Naples Elementary School and Naples American High School.

== Sights ==
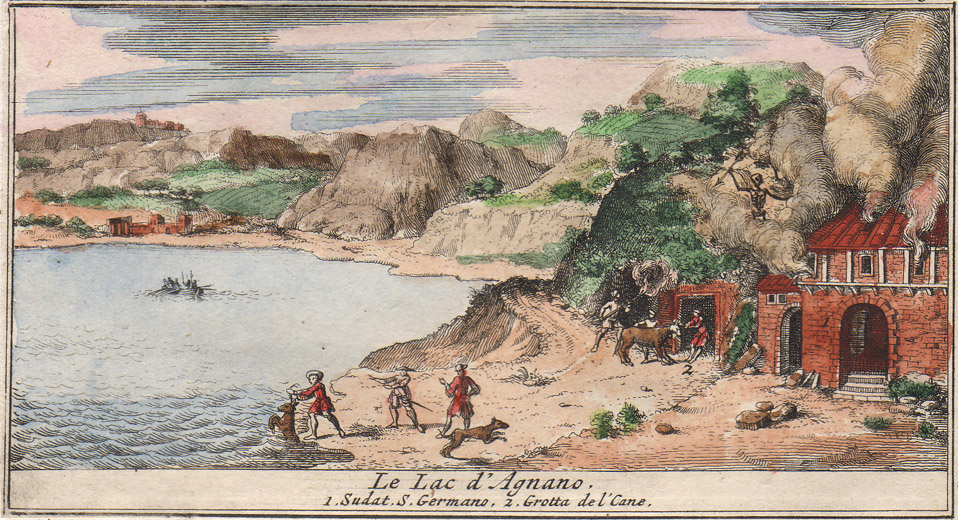
Lake Agnano and Grotto of the Dog (1751)

The ruins of ancient Greek thermal baths from the 4th-rd c. BC are visible in the former mud pit of the new baths. Most of the existing structures date from the Roman period of the 1st-2nd century AD and are to the west of the main road.

The Grotto of the Dog near the baths is an ancient cave which fills with volcanic carbon dioxide and has killed animals that entered it.

=== Ancient Roman Baths ===
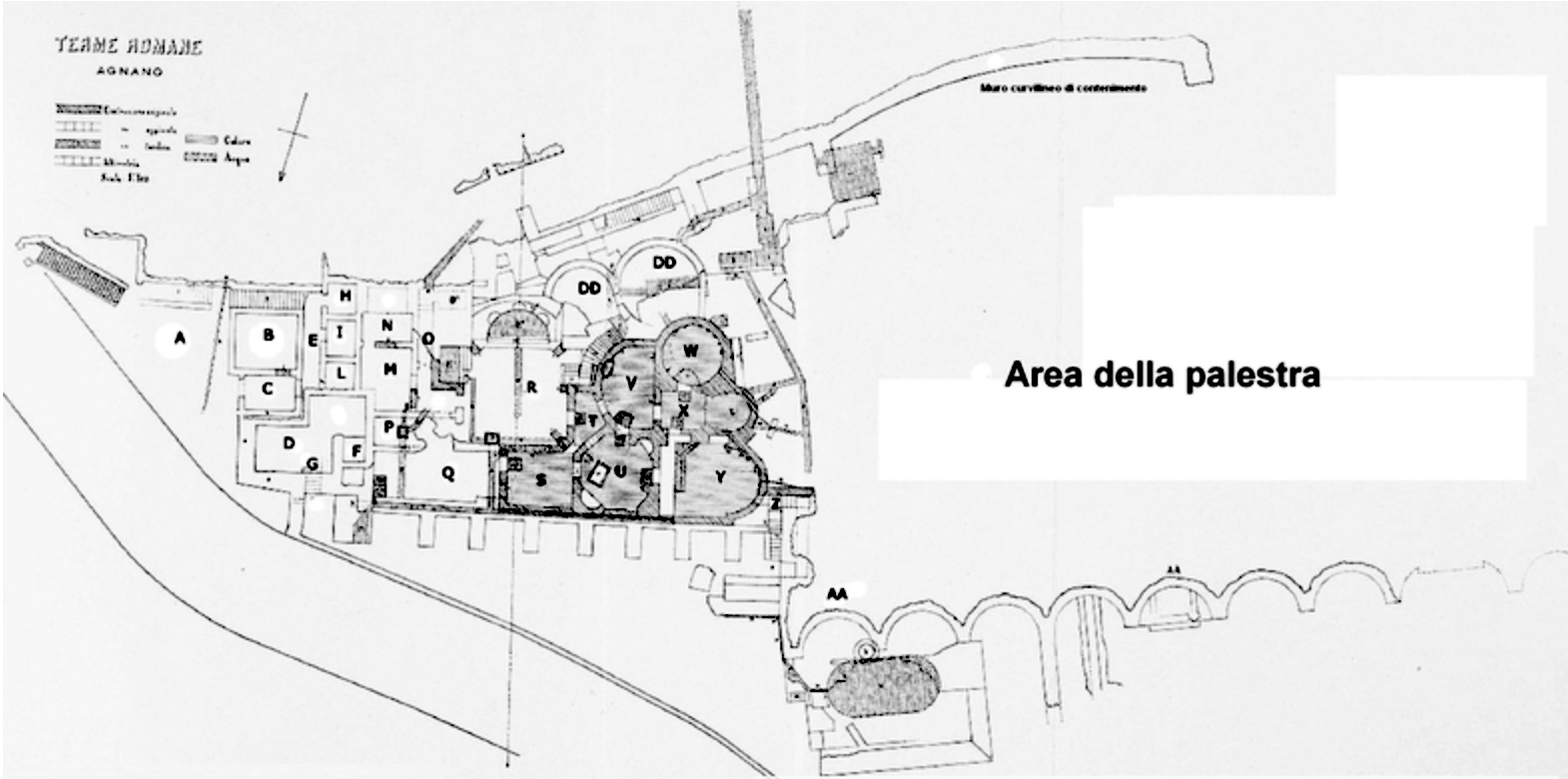
Roman baths of Agnano R:frigidarium X:tepidarium Y:caldarium V,W:laconicum

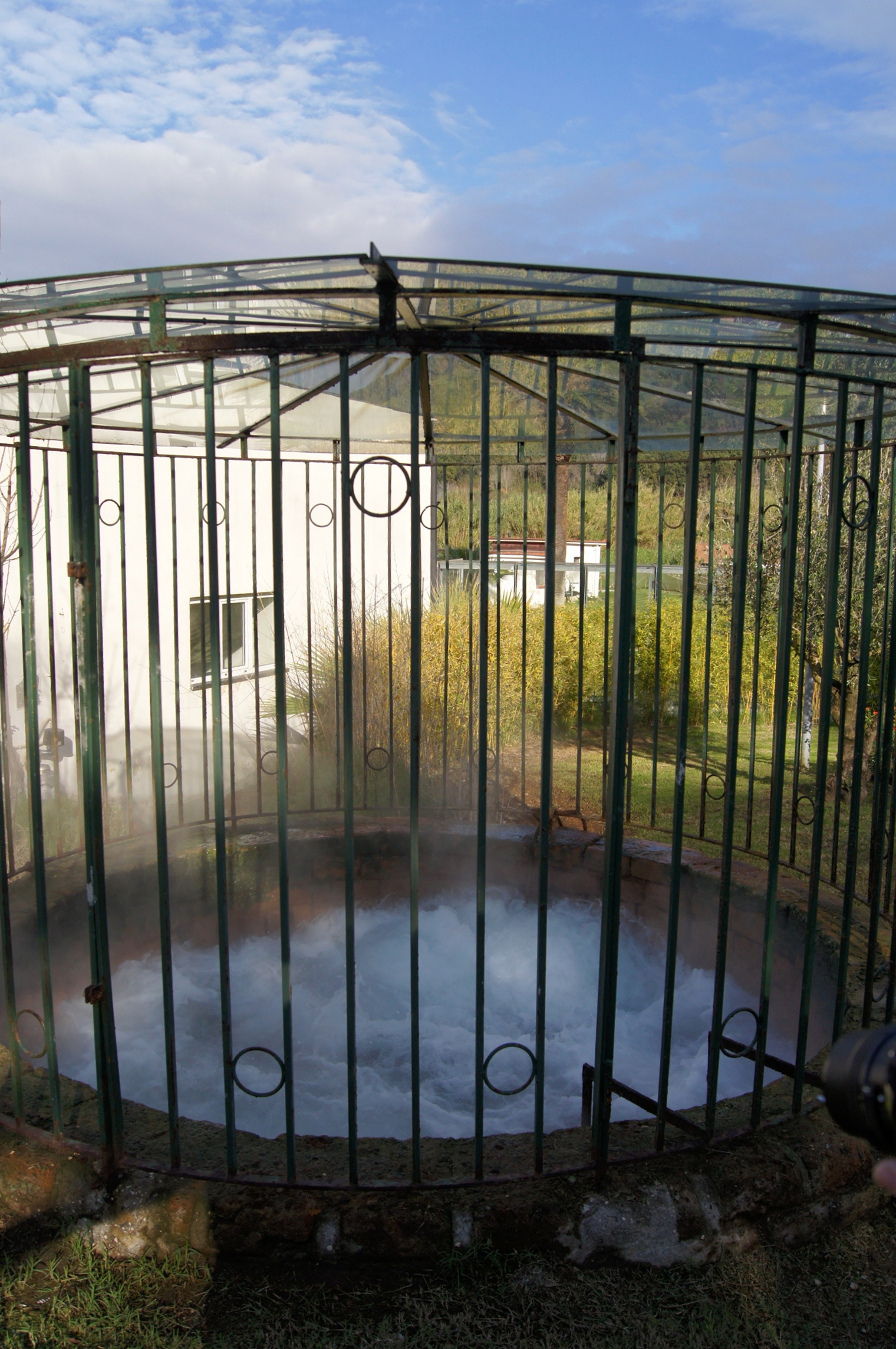
Hot Spring (40degC)

The remains are located in the grounds of the modern spa and in the adjacent CIM Military Equestrian Centre. The baths area is very extensive and occupies the entire northern side of the ridge on several terraces. The complex was investigated towards the end of the 1800s and systematically in 1911 by V. Macchioro. The baths were probably part of a mansio, or station, beside the road from Neapolis and Puteoli. At present parts of the main terrace, the baths and the curvilinear wall supporting an upper terrace are clearly visible.

The baths were fed by the copious local hot springs which still flow. For its cold water supply system, a series of cisterns communicating with each other are close to the curvilinear wall. After the Aqua Augusta (Serino aqueduct) was built in the late 1st c. BC, passing along the rim of the crater just above the baths, a secondary conduit branched off it to the baths through a 70 m-long tunnel dug into the mountain and which poured the water into two basins. From here the water reached the individual rooms by means of a system of tubs, pipes and taps, the main conduit of which ran under the floor of the frigidarium.

The baths included an apodyterium, frigidarium, and several warm rooms: (tepidaria, caldaria and laconica).

The laconicum was heated through openings both in the walls and from under the floor. As prescribed by Vitruvius, the bathing route involved the passage from the laconicum to the tepidarium so as to allow, after sweating, the use of the tepid bath. This room, equipped with a basin, also allowed the passage from the more heated rooms to the frigidarium . The calidarium is rectangular in shape with one of the short sides having an apse and is heated by a praefurnium or furnace so as to reach a higher temperature.

Magnificent mosaics and sculptures were discovered here.

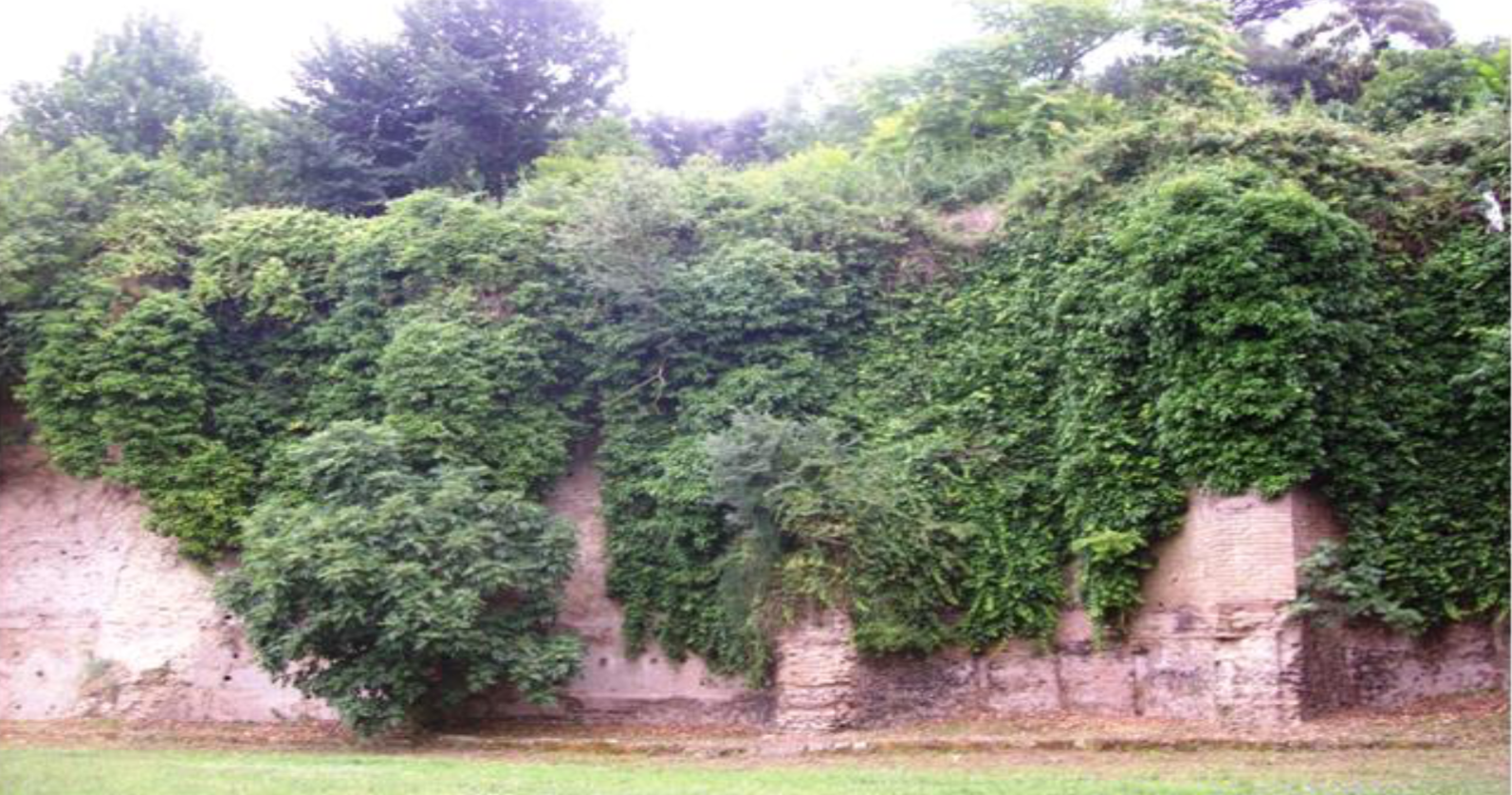
Terrace wall

=== Finds ===
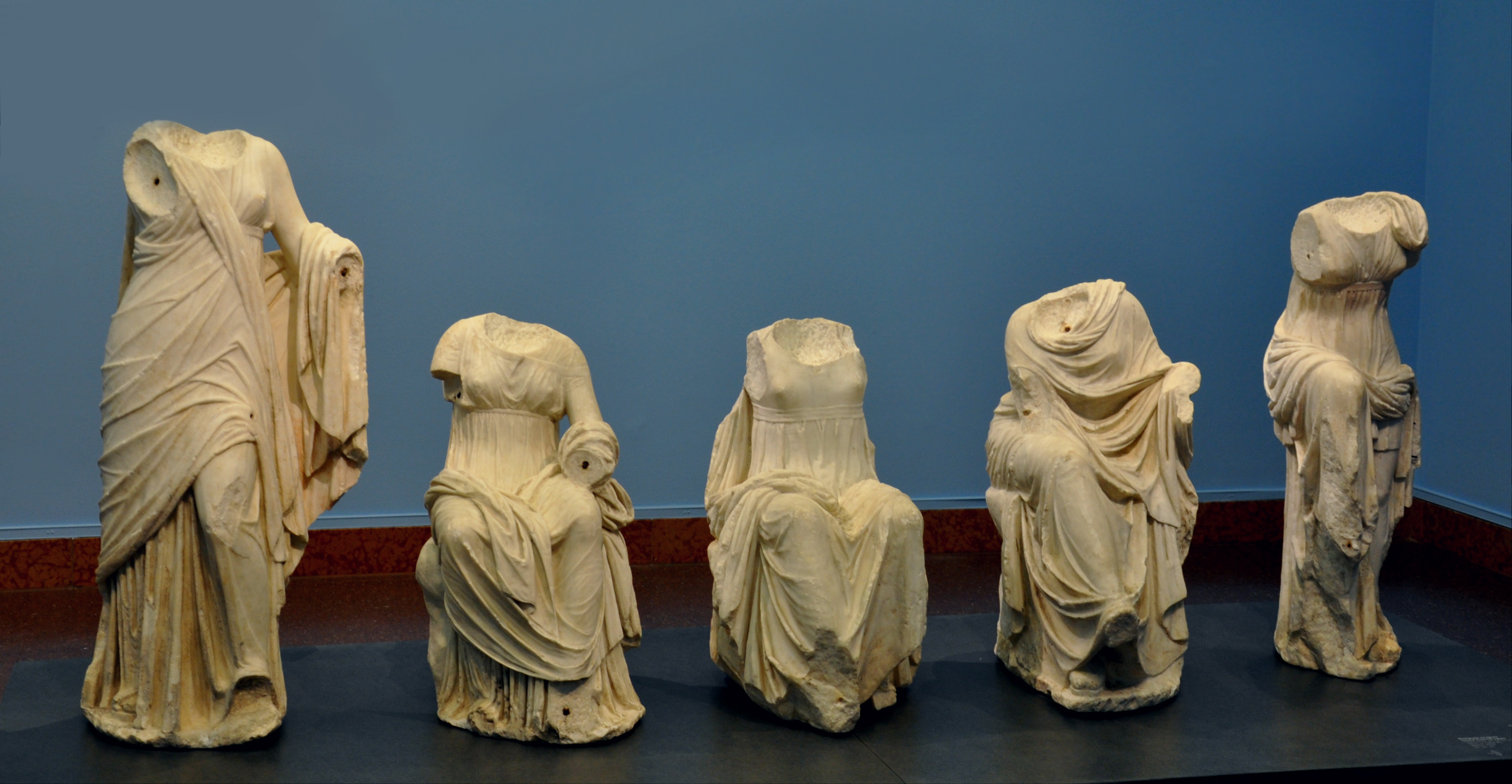
Muses group from Agnano, Greek 120-100BC, originally from Delos (Liebieghaus, Frankfurt)

A group of statues of muses, including the famous Frankfurt Urania, was discovered in the Roman baths and is now in the Liebieghaus museum. The figures, dating from 120-100BC, had been removed from their original location in ancient times and it is believed that they were originally from Delos near the temple of Apollo. The fine execution of the robes is especially skillful and their arrangement and textures emphasise the figures’ beautiful bodies. Although the condition of the group is somewhat fragmentary, the style is very naturalistic.

Four sculptures were also found in the frigidarium during the first excavations before 1911: Venus marina, armed Aphrodite, Hermes with child Dionysus, and Ganymede, now in the Naples museum datable to the first half of the 2nd century AD.
