= Phlegraean Fields =

Caldera volcano west of Naples, Italy

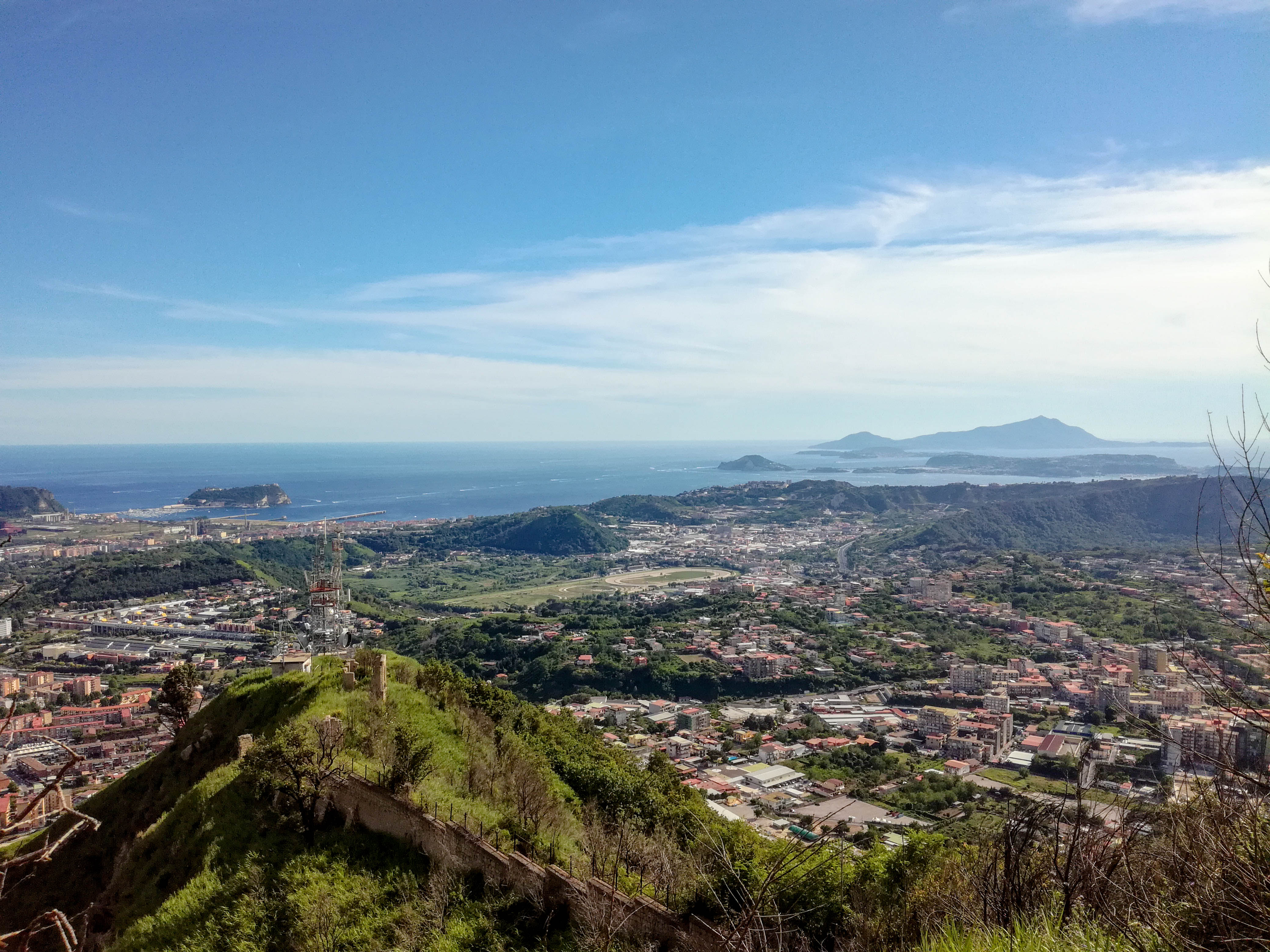
- The Phlegraean Fields, seen from the Hermitage of Camaldoli in Naples

Highest point
- Elevation: 458 m (1,503 ft)
- Coordinates: 40.827°N 14.139°E

Naming
- Native name: Campi Flegrei (Italian)

Geography
- Location: Metropolitan City of Naples, Campania, Italy

Geology
- Rock age: 40,000 years
- Mountain type: Caldera
- Volcanic arc: Campanian volcanic arc
- Last eruption: 29 September to 6 October 1538

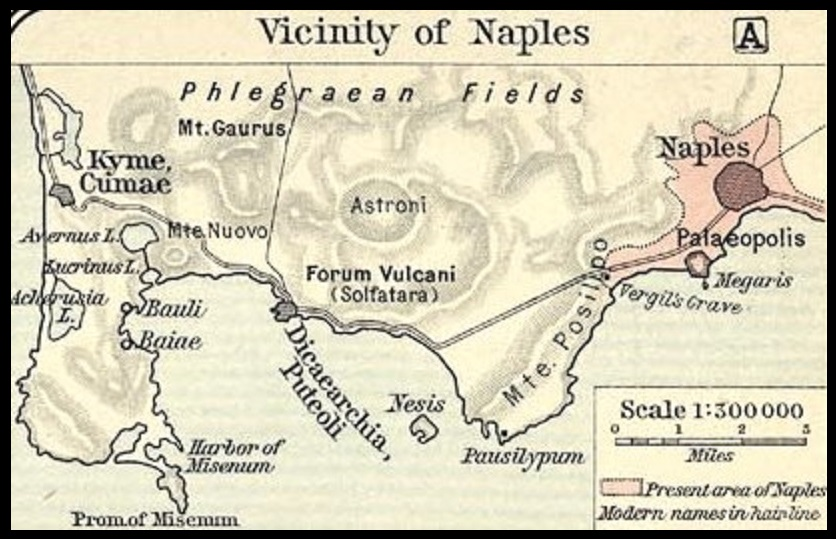
A 1911 map of the Phlegraean Fields

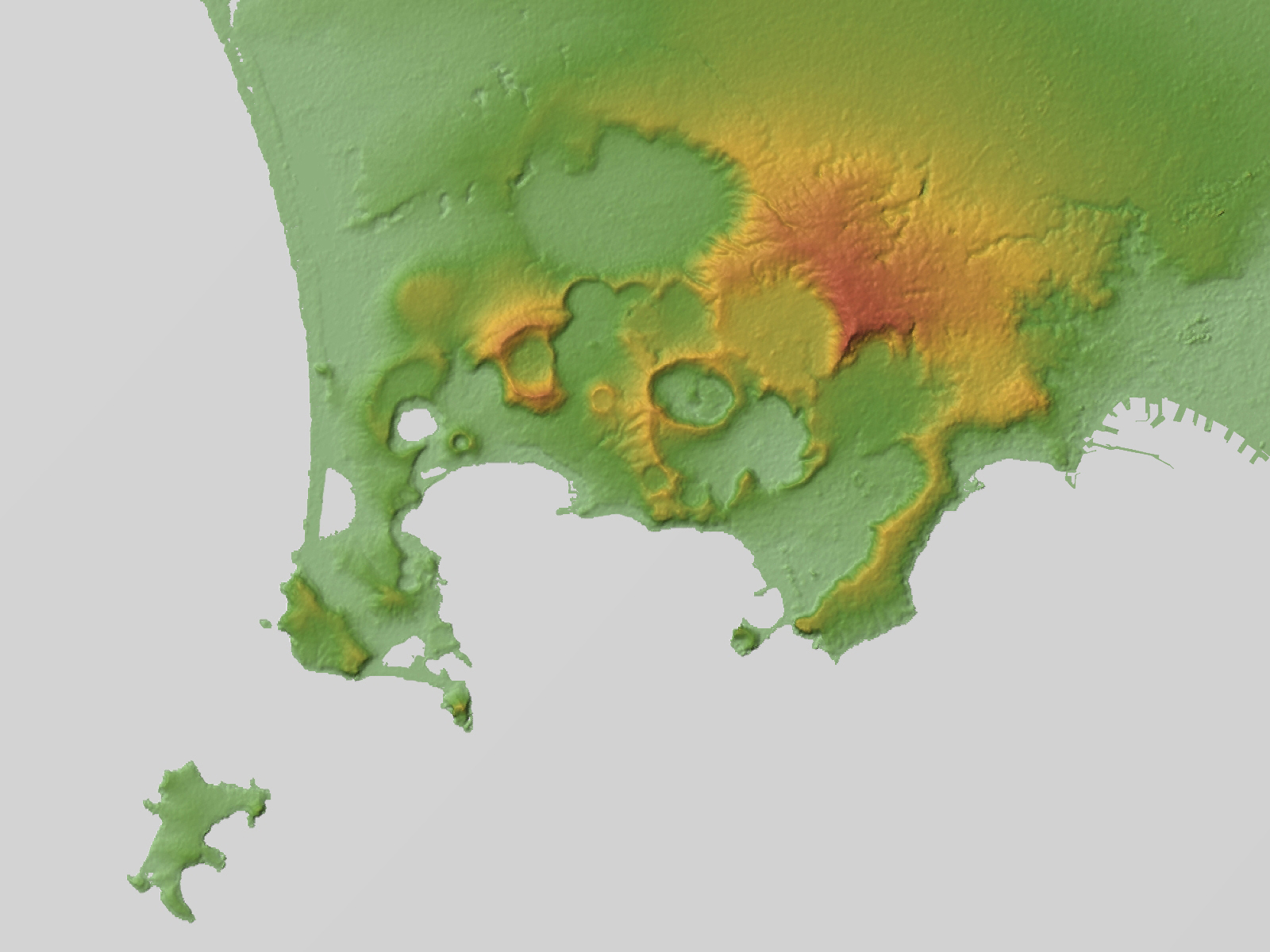
A topographic relief map of the Phlegraean Fields

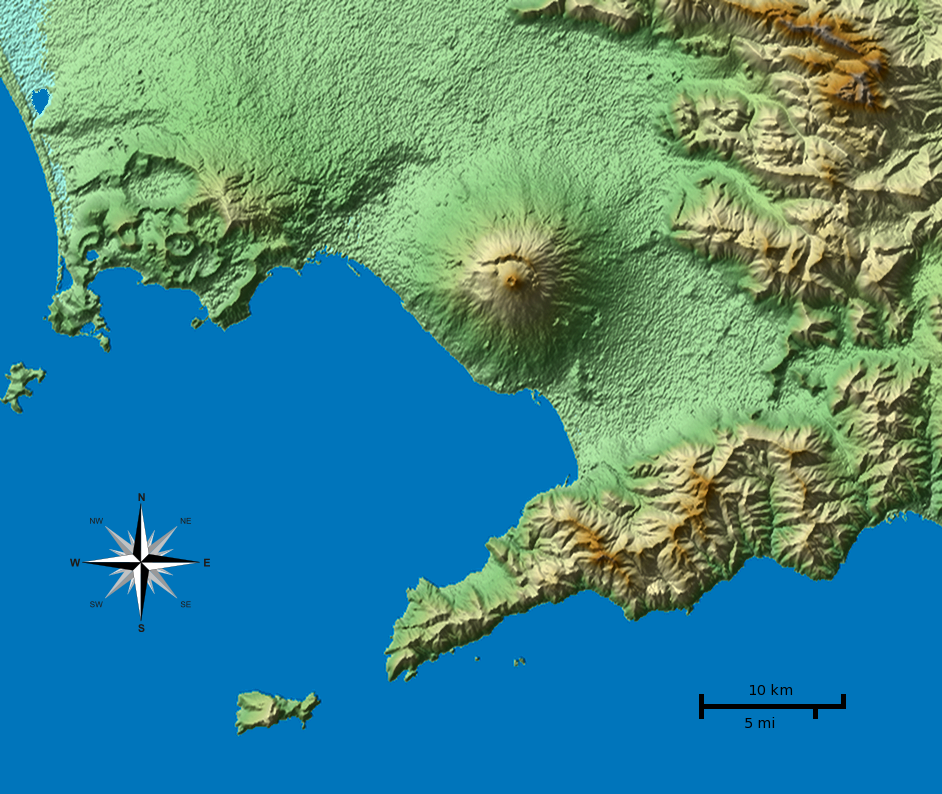
A topographic relief map of the Gulf of Naples with the Phlegraean Fields and Mount Vesuvius

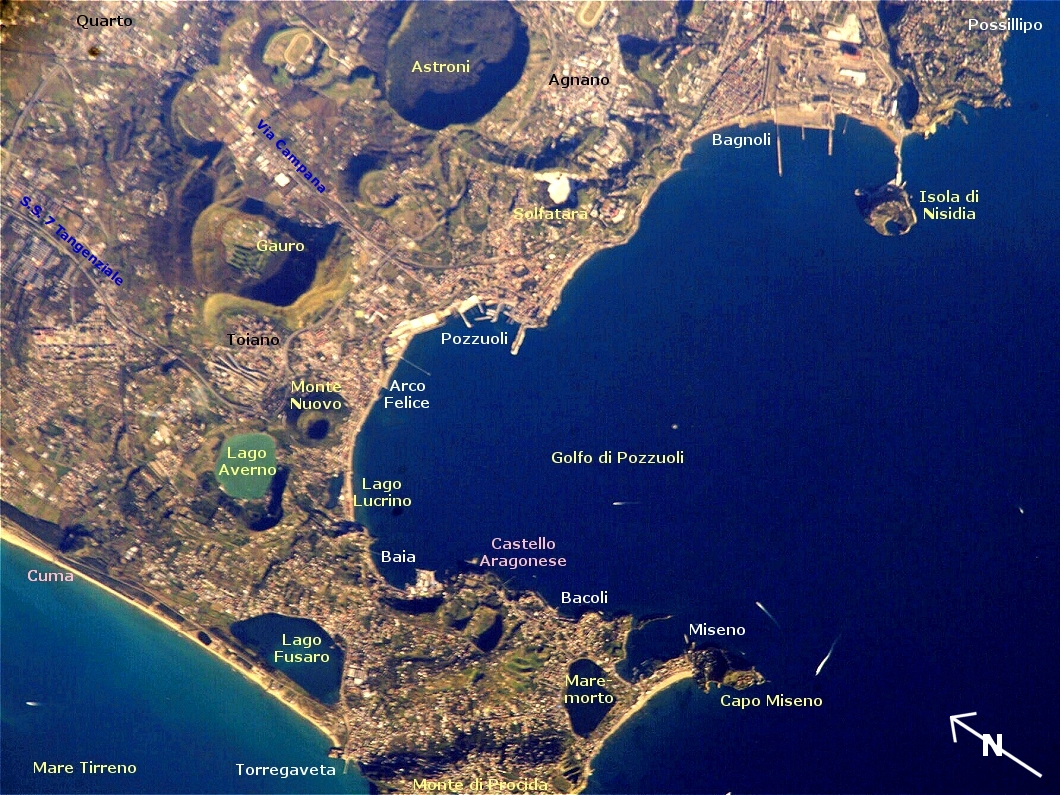
A satellite photo of the Phlegraean Fields

The Phlegraean Fields (Italian: Campi Flegrei, Italian: [ˈkampi fleˈɡrɛi]; Neapolitan: Campe Flegree; Latin: Phlegraei campi; Ancient Greek: Φλεγραία Πεδία) is a large volcanic caldera west of Naples, Italy. The Neapolitan Yellow Tuff eruption (about 12ka BP) produced just 50 cubic kilometers. It is, however, one of relatively few volcanoes large enough to form a caldera. It is part of the Campanian volcanic arc, which includes Mount Vesuvius, about 9 km (6 miles) east of Naples. The Phlegraean Fields is monitored by the Vesuvius Observatory. Part of the city of Naples is built over it. The Phlegraean Fields' largest known eruptions have an estimated volcanic explosivity index (VEI) of 7. It is often called a supervolcano in popular media, although the accepted definition for that term is a volcano that has had an eruption with a VEI of 8, the highest level. (Note: Non-scientific media have described the area as a supervolcano but it does not meet the criterion set by vulcanologists: an eruption with a volcanic explosivity index (VEI) of 8, the largest recorded value on the index. This means the volume of deposits for such an eruption is greater than 1,000 cubic kilometers (240 cubic miles))

The area of the caldera consists of 24 craters and volcanic edifices. Most of them lie under the Gulf of Naples. There are effusive gaseous manifestations in the Solfatara crater, which was believed in ancient Rome to be the home of Vulcan, the god of fire. The area features bradyseismic phenomena, which are most evident at the Macellum of Pozzuoli, misidentified by 18th-century excavators as a temple of Serapis: bands of boreholes left by marine molluscs on marble columns show that the level of the site in relation to sea level has varied. Hydrothermal activity can still be observed at Lucrino, Agnano and the town of Pozzuoli.

At present, the Phlegraean Fields area comprises the Naples districts of Agnano and Fuorigrotta, the area of Pozzuoli, Bacoli, Monte di Procida, Quarto, the Phlegraean Islands, Ischia, Procida and Vivara.

The Solfatara crater was accessible on foot until 2017 and contains many steam-emitting fumaroles and over 150 pools, at the last count, of boiling mud. Several subsidiary cones and tuff craters, one filled by Lake Avernus, lie within the caldera.

== Geochemistry ==
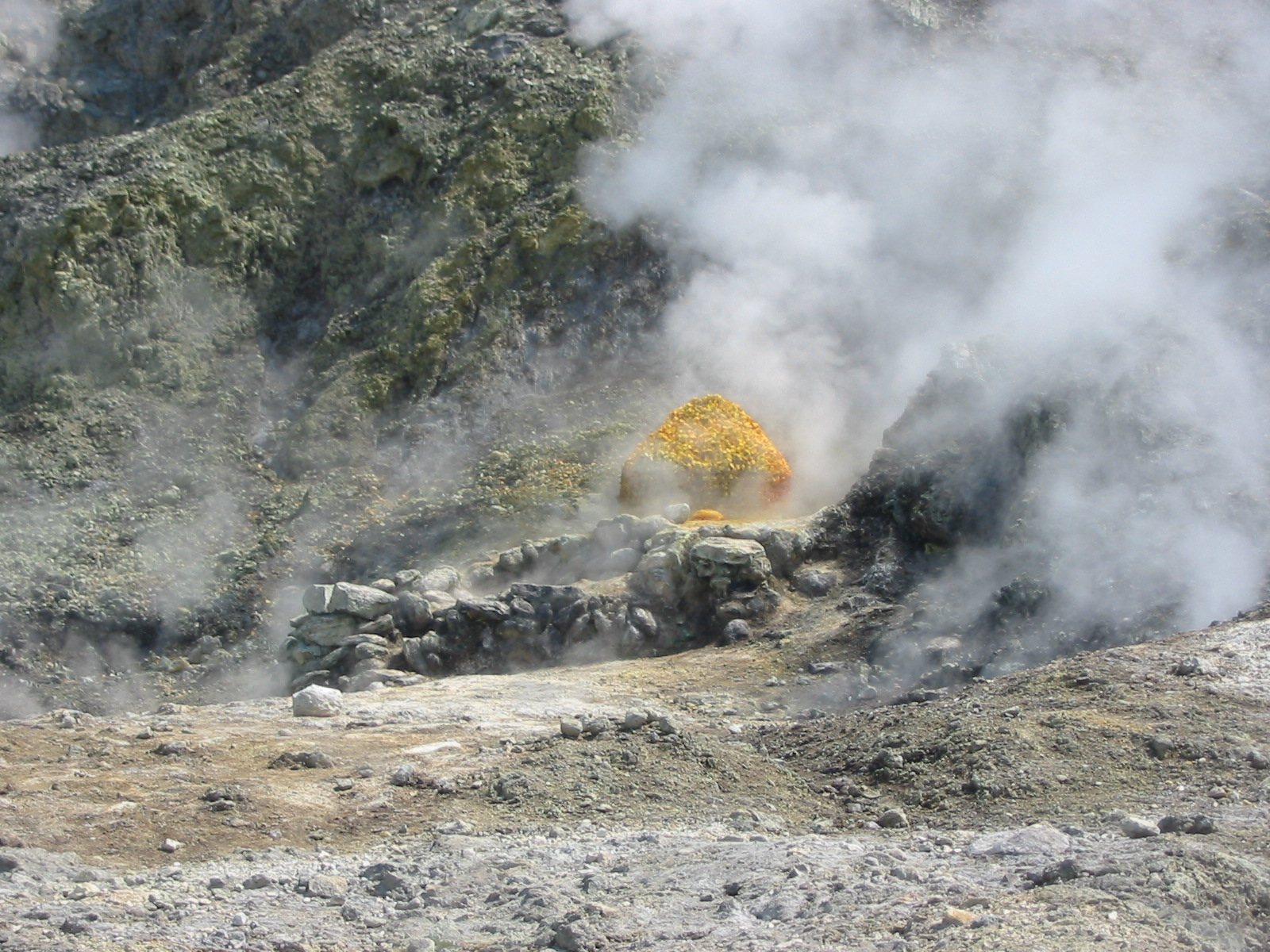
Sulphur and fumaroles at the Solfatara crater

The magma underlying the Phlegraean Fields produces lavas of varying composition but generally rich in potassium. Trachyte is the most common eruptive product, unusually alkali-rich in some cases. Peralkaline phonolitic trachyte and latite have also been produced, and there is rare trachybasalt.

== Geological phases ==
Ash across the Mediterranean region is evidence of a major eruption 109,000 years ago, which has been named the Maddaloni Eruption, or X-6. Modelling gives a magnitude estimate of 7.6 and VEI 7, only slightly lower than the Campanian Ignimbrite of about 40,000 years ago, making it the second largest event in the eruptive history of the Campi Flegrei.

Three geological phases or periods are recognised and distinguished.

- First Phlegraean Period. It is thought that the eruption of the Archiflegreo volcano occurred about 39,280 ± 110 years (older estimate ~37,000 years) ago, erupting about 200 km^{3} (48 cu mi) of magma (500 km^{3} (120 cu mi) bulk volume) to produce the Campanian Ignimbrite eruption. Its volcanic explosivity index (VEI) was 7 and it left a large part of eastern Europe covered in ash.
  "The dating of the Campanian Ignimbrite Eruption (CI) to ~37,000 calendar years B.P. draws attention to the coincidence of this volcanic catastrophe and the suite of coeval, Late Pleistocene biocultural changes that occurred within and outside the Mediterranean region. These included the Middle to Upper Paleolithic cultural transition and the replacement of Neanderthal populations by anatomically modern Homo sapiens, a subject of sustained debate. No less than 150 km^{3} (36 cu mi) of magma were extruded in this eruption (the CI eruption), traces of which can be detected in Greenland ice cores. As widespread discontinuities in archaeological sequences are observed at or after this eruption, a significant interference with ongoing human processes in Mediterranean Europe is hypothesized."

It is believed that the resulting ecological crisis wiped out both the last Neanderthal and the first Homo sapiens populations of the early Upper Paleolithic. Modern humans then repopulated Europe from the east after the eruption and the ice age that took place from 38,000 to 36,000 BC.

The Phlegrean area is characterised by banks of piperno and pipernoid grey tuff at Camaldoli hill, as in the northern and western ridge of Mount Cumae; other referable deep products are those found at Monte di Procida, recognizable in the cliffs of its coast.

- Second Phlegraean Period, between 35,000 and 10,500 years ago. This is characterized by the Neapolitan yellow tuff that is the remains of an immense underwater volcano, with a diameter of c. 15 kilometres (9.3 mi); Pozzuoli is at its centre. Approximately 12,000 years ago the last major eruption occurred, forming a smaller caldera inside the main caldera, with its centre where the town of Pozzuoli lies today.
- Third Phlegraean Period, between 8,000 and 500 years ago. This is characterized by white pozzolana, the material that forms the majority of volcanos in the Fields. Broadly speaking, it can be said there was initial activity to the southwest in the zone of Bacoli and Baiae (10,000–8,000 years ago); intermediate activity in an area centred between Pozzuoli, Montagna Spaccata [Cleft Mountain] and Agnano (8,000–3,900 years ago); and more recent activity towards the west, which formed Lake Avernus and Monte Nuovo (New Mountain) (3,800–500 years ago).

Volcanic deposits indicative of eruption have been dated by argon at 315,000, 205,000, 157,000 and 18,000 years ago.

=== Since 1500 ===
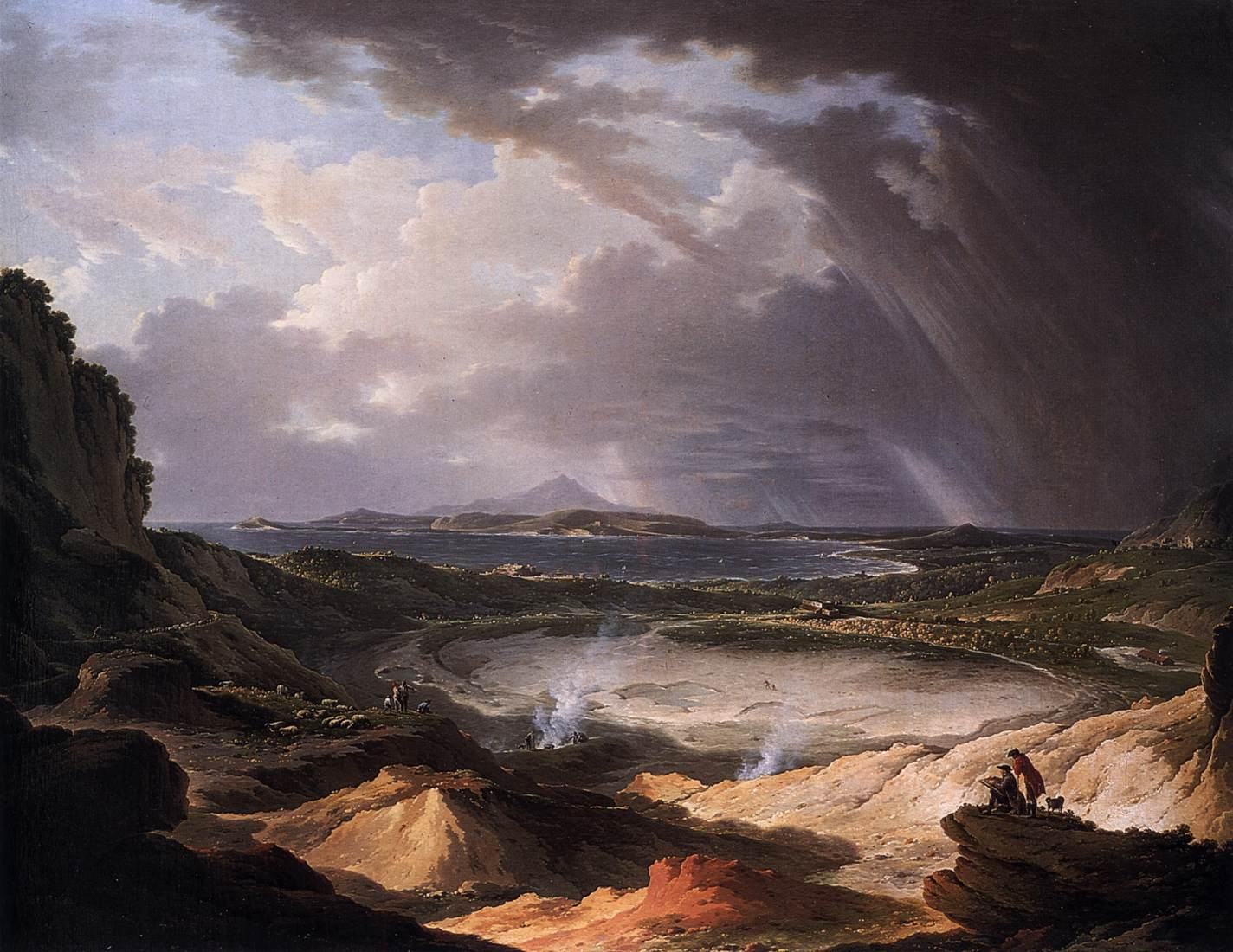
A fumarole at the Phlegraean Fields. Painting by Michael Wutky, 1780s.

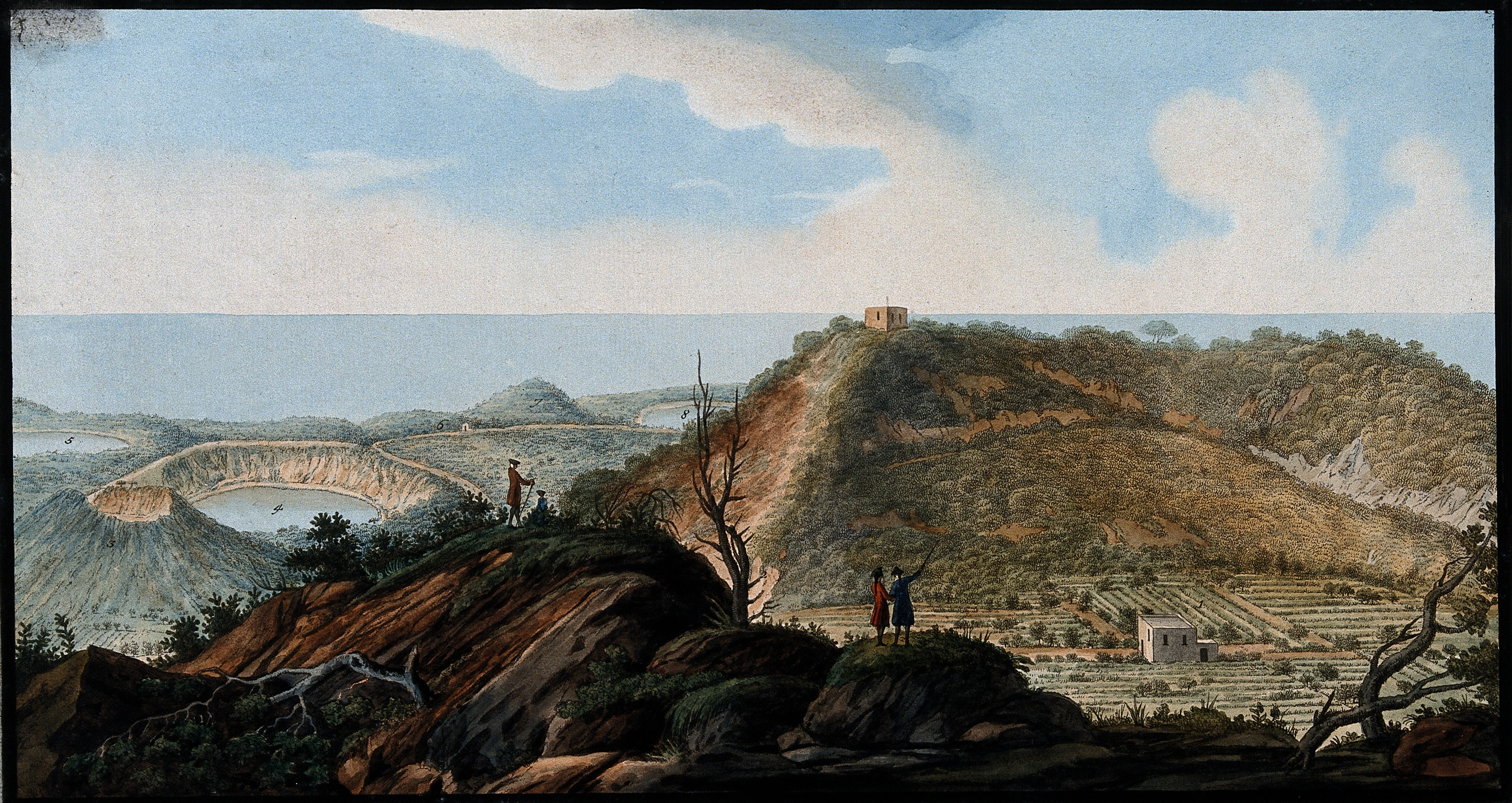
The crater of Mount Barbaro (right), with other volcanic features in the background. Coloured etching by Pietro Fabris, 1776

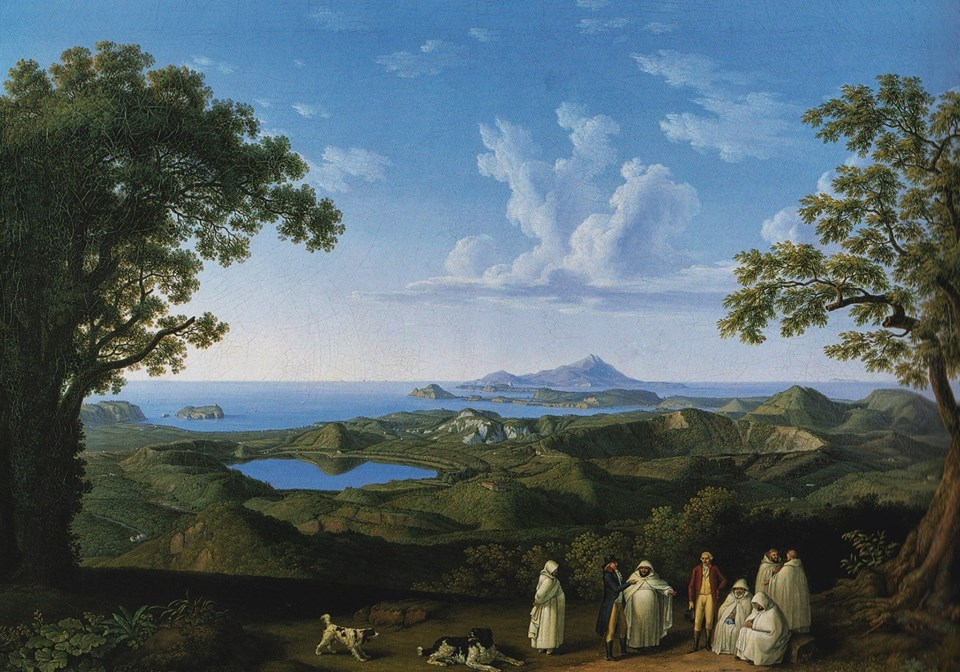
A painting of the Phlegraean Fields in 1797

In 1538, an eight-day eruption in the area deposited enough material to create a new hill, Monte Nuovo. It has risen about 2 m (7 ft) from ground level since 1970.

The volcanic island of Ischia suffered three destructive earthquakes in 1828, 1881, and the most destructive one in 1883, with a magnitude of 4.2–5.2 and causing catastrophic shaking assigned XI (Extreme) on the MCS scale. Extreme damage was reported on the island, and over 2,000 residents perished.

A prominent uplift episode between 1982 and 1986 produced 1.8 meters of uplift and extensive seismicity

A 2009 journal article stated that deformation of the caldera centre near Pozzuoli might presage an eruptive event within decades. In 2012 the International Continental Scientific Drilling Program planned to drill 3.5 kilometres (11,000 feet) below the earth's surface near Pompeii, in order to monitor the massive molten rock chamber below and provide early warning of any eruption. Local scientists were worried that drilling could precipitate an eruption or earthquake; programme scientists said it was no different from industrial drilling in the area. The drilling was halted in 2010, but later resumed. A Reuters article emphasized that the area could produce a "super volcano" that might kill millions, but gave no evidence to the claim.

A study from the Istituto Nazionale di Geofisica e Vulcanologia reported that the volcanic unrest of the Campi Flegrei caldera from January 2012 to June 2013 was characterised by rapid ground uplift of about 11 cm (4 in), with a peak rate of about 3 cm (1 in) per month during December 2012. It added that from 1985 to 2011 the dynamics of ground uplift were mostly linked to the caldera's hydrothermal system, and that this relation broke down in 2012. The driving mechanism of the ground uplift changed to periodical emplacement of magma within a flat sill-shaped magmatic reservoir about 3,000 m (9,843 ft) in depth, 500 m (1,640 ft) south from the port of Pozzuoli.

In December 2016, activity became so high that an eruption was feared. In May 2017, a study by University College London and the Vesuvius Observatory published in Nature Communications concluded that an eruption might be closer than previously thought. The study found that the geographical unrest since the 1950s has a cumulative effect, causing a build-up of energy in the crust and making the volcano more susceptible to eruption.

On 21 August 2017 there was a magnitude 4 earthquake on the western edge of the Campi Flegrei area. Two people were killed and many more people injured in Casamicciola on the northern coast of the island of Ischia, which is south of the epicentre.

=== Activity since 2020 ===
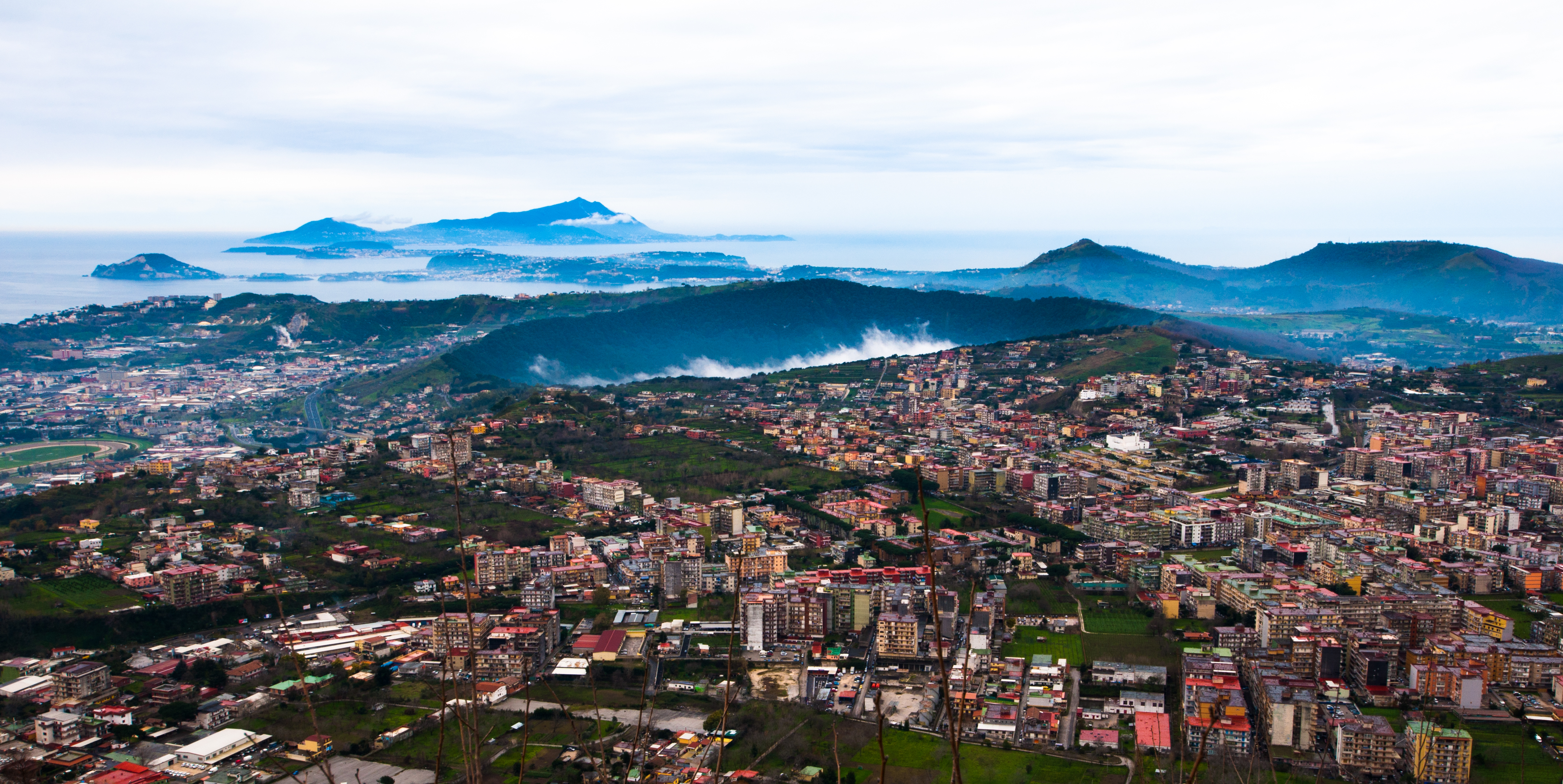
The Phlegraean Fields in the 21st century

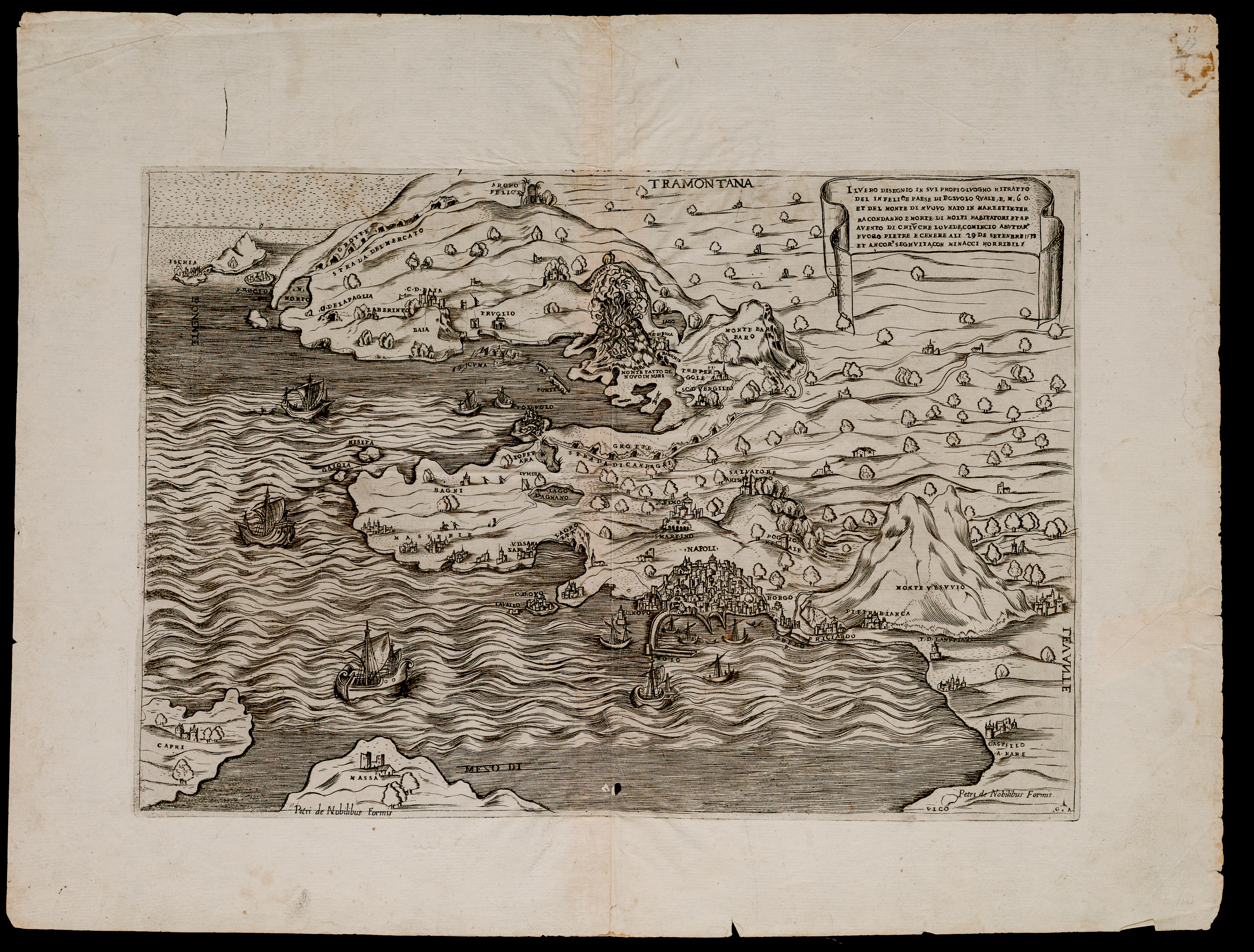
Map of the Campania region depicting the 1538 eruption and Pozzuoli. From the Franco Novacco Map Collection at the Newberry Library.

The reason for the seismicity and bulging ground is not definitively known as of 2023. According to one model, called the "shallow magma model" in a Scientific American article, magma is pushing to break through the surface, making an explosive eruption with magma flow likely. However seismic imaging rules out the presence of a large near-surface magma body. In what has been termed the hot fluids model, steam and hot gases generated above much deeper magma are the cause of inflation. In this case activity could stop abruptly, or lead to a phreatic eruption of hot liquids, gases and rock fragments, rather than an eruption of lava. While very dangerous, a phreatic eruption would be less so than a magma eruption. An answer to this question would improve understanding of how likely this volcano, and other large volcanoes and supervolcanoes, are to erupt, and what warning signs to look out for.

A February 2020 status report indicated that earth uplift around Pozzuoli continued at steady rates, with a maximum average of 0.7 cm per month since July 2017. Gas emissions and fumarole temperatures did not change significantly. In May 2024 the ground was reported to be rising by 2 cm per month, with the rate increasing.

On April 26, 2020, a moderate earthquake swarm hit Campi Flegrei caldera, with about 34 earthquakes ranging between magnitude 0 and magnitude 3.1 centred around the port city of Pozzuoli. The strongest quake in the sequence was of magnitude 3.1, the strongest at the time since the last major period of unrest and rapid uplift in 1982-1984. However, no new fumaroles were reported.

Volcanic activity was reported in January 2022 to be increasing. In the year to September 2023, seismic activity had intensified, particularly in the later months. On 27 September 2023, a magnitude 4.2 earthquake—the strongest in 40 years—prompted the preparation of contingency plans to evacuate up to 360,000 people in the area. Despite a further 4.0 quake on 2 October, most volcanologists consider that a major eruption is not expected imminently.

A best-case scenario for the recent unrest was deemed to be the activity ending, as happened after much activity in the 1980s. The worst would be a volcanic eruption like the Monte Nuovo eruption of 1538 or a large phreatic (steam) explosion. A study by Italy's National Institute of Geophysics and Volcanology (INGV) and University College London (UCL) in June 2023 concluded that the volcano was edging towards "breaking point" and in an "extremely dangerous state". Nello Musumeci, Italian minister for civil protection, was to ask Neapolitan local officials for an "acceleration in the drafting of exodus plans in the event of an emergency"; he said that evacuation would only be carried out in the event of "extreme necessity". Mass evacuation plans were to be tested at the end of May 2024.

Intense seismic activity continued in 2024. On 20 May 2024, seismic activity intensified, with a swarm of 150 earthquakes in a few hours, one of magnitude 4.4 causing fear among the population of Pozzuoli and some cracks and minor damage to buildings. Schools and a prison were evacuated.

A new seismic swarm has been ongoing since mid-February 2025. On 13 March 2025 at 1:25:02, another earthquake of magnitude 4.4 occurred between Pozzuoli and Bagnoli, quarter of Naples. Some minor damage and one person injured by a falling false ceiling in a house. The situation is being monitored and all institutions are involved: municipalities, Campania region, Naples prefecture, firefighters and civil protection volunteers. On 14 March 2025, a new earthquake of magnitude 3.5 struck, and the following day an earthquake of magnitude 3.9. On 13 May 2025, at 12.07, a new earthquake of magnitude 4.4 followed by a series of earthquakes of lower magnitude. On 30 June 2025, at 12.47, a new earthquake of magnitude 4.6 followed by a series of earthquakes of lower magnitude.

Since seismic activity occurred in 2024 at a depth of up to three kilometres, the expected magnitude of earthquakes is around 4.4-4.5. The volcano's caldera is about 10–12 km in diameter, which suggests that earthquakes are local in nature and are unlikely to propagate over greater distances.

However, it appears that surrounding areas and zones have a contiguity or continuity of seismic activity, such as the earthquake that occurred in provicia of Avellino on 24 October 2025, the earthquake that occurred in Irpinia on 25 October 2025, and the following earthquake that occurred at the Phlegraean Fields on the night of 26 October 2025.

On 31 July 2026, a new earthquake of magnitude 4.7 struck the Campi Flegrei area at a depth of about 3 km (2 miles).

=== Geoheritage designation ===
In respect of its 18th and 19th century role in the development of geoscience, not least volcanology, this locality was included by the International Union of Geological Sciences (IUGS) in its assemblage of 100 'geological heritage sites' around the world in a listing published in October 2022.

== Wine ==
Italian wine, both red and white, under the Campi Flegrei DOC appellation comes from this area. Grapes destined for DOC production must be harvested up to a maximum yield of 12 tonnes/hectare for red grape varieties, and 13 t/ha for white grape varieties. The finished wines need to be fermented to a minimum alcohol level of 11.5% for reds and 10.5% for whites. While most Campi Flegrei wines are blends, varietal wines can be made from individual varieties, provided the variety used comprises at least 90% of the blend and the wine is fermented to at least 12% alcohol for reds and 11% for whites.

Red Campi Flegrei is a blend of 50–70% Piedirosso, 10–30% Aglianico and/or Sciascinoso and up to 10% of other local (both red and white) grape varieties. The whites are composed of 50–70% Falanghina, 10–30% Biancolella and/or Coda di Volpe, with up to 30% of other local white grape varieties.

== Cultural importance ==
Campi Flegrei has had strategic and cultural importance.

- The area was the site of quarries for piperno stone, an ignimbrite (welded tuff), a stone that was used to build much of Naples; piperno "is probably the most important building stone of Naples, used over a time-span from at least the Roman age until the beginning of the 20th century." Piperno stone was used in the construction of Pompeii, along with other stone including Naples yellow tuff, foamy basalt, and limestone.
- The area was known to the ancient Greeks, who had a colony nearby at Cumae, the seat of the Cumaean Sibyl.
- The beach of Miliscola, in Bacoli, was the Roman military academy headquarters.
- Lake Avernus was believed to be an entrance to the underworld, and is portrayed as such in the Aeneid of Virgil. During the civil war between Octavian and Antony, Agrippa tried to turn the lake into a military port, the Portus Julius.
- Baiae, now partially submerged, was a fashionable coastal resort and was the site of summer villas of Julius Caesar, Nero, and Hadrian (who died there).
- In Pozzuoli is the Flavian Amphitheatre, the third-largest Italian amphitheatre after the Colosseum and the Capuan Amphitheatre.
- The Via Appia passed through the comune of Quarto, entirely built on an extinguished crater.
- The Cave of Dogs, a famous tourist attraction during the early modern period, is on the eastern side of the Fields.
- Europe's youngest mountain, Monte Nuovo, is here. A WWF oasis lies inside the enormous Astroni crater.
- The tombs of Agrippina the Elder and Scipio Africanus are here.
- At Baiae, now in the comune of Bacoli, the most ancient hot spring complex was built for the richest Romans. It included the largest ancient dome in the world before the construction of the Roman Pantheon.
- Astronomical broadcaster and writer Patrick Moore used to cite these Fields as an example of why the impact craters on the Moon must be of volcanic origin, which was considered to be a valid hypothesis by some until the 1960s.
- There is a theory that the Campanian Ignimbrite super-eruption around about 39,280 ± 110 years ago contributed to the extinction of the Neanderthals, based on evidence from Mezmaiskaya cave in the Caucasus Mountains of southern Russia.

== See also ==
- List of volcanoes in Italy
- Phlegra (mythology)
- Phlegraean Fields red zone
