= Cave of Dogs =

Cave near Naples, Italy

Coordinates: 40.833333°N 14.166667°E

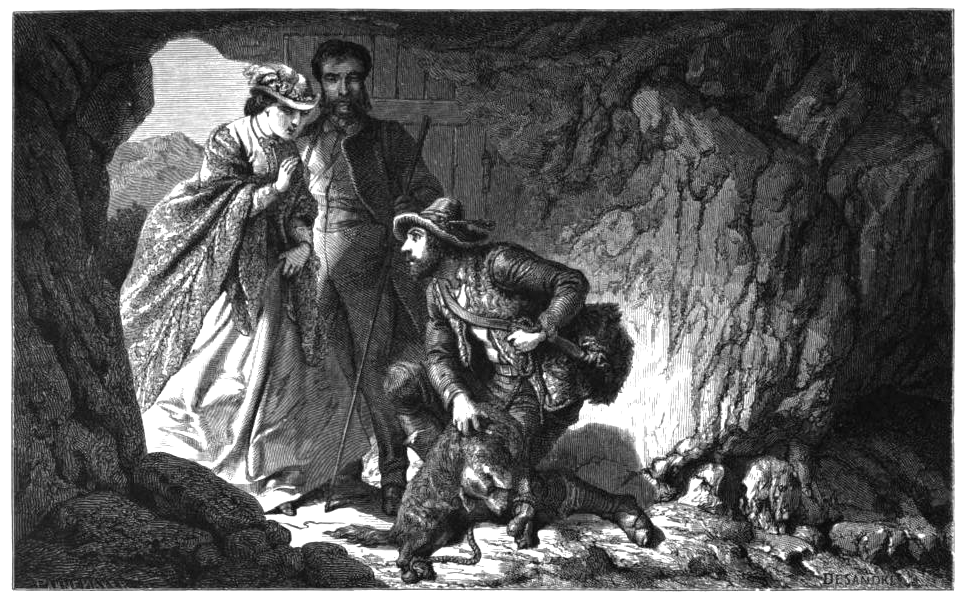
Illustration of the cave from a 1865 science book. A guide shows a suffocated dog to a man and woman tourist.

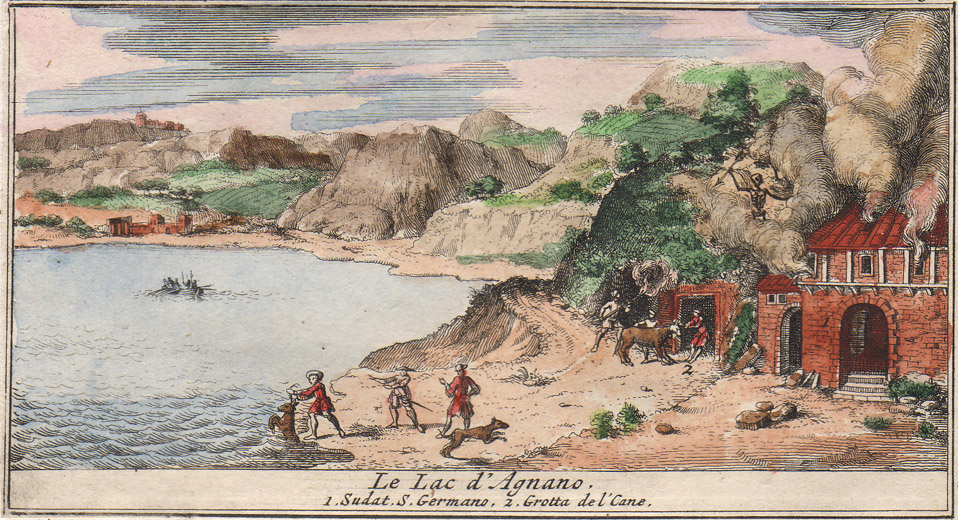
Lake Agnano and the Cave of Dogs depicted in an etching by the Sieur de Rogissart, 1706

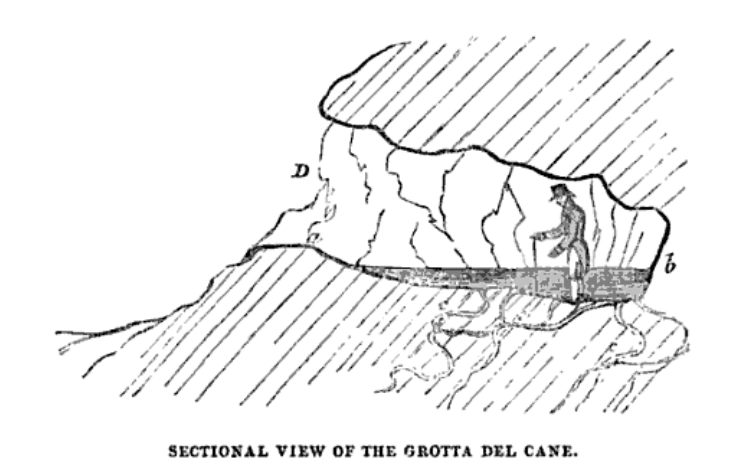
The principle of the Cave of Dogs sketched by Alfred Swaine Taylor, 1832. The carbon dioxide (marked with a darker color) gathers in the lower part of the cave.

The Cave of Dogs (Italian: Grotta del Cane) is a cave near Naples, Italy. Volcanic gases seeping into the cave give the air inside a high concentration of carbon dioxide. Dogs held inside would faint; at one time this was a tourist attraction.

== Description ==
The Cave of Dogs (Italian: Grotta del Cane, literally "Cave of the Dog")) is a cave about ten metres deep on the eastern side of the Phlegraean Fields near Pozzuoli, Naples. Inside the cave is a fumarole that releases carbon dioxide of volcanic origin.

The cave is thought to have been constructed in classical antiquity, possibly as a sudatorium; if so, the CO_{2} emissions must have been much lower at the time. It may have been known to Pliny the Elder, who, in his Natural History Chapter 95 (written 77–79 AD), mentions a location near Pozzuoli where animals die from poisonous fumes. However, the first unambiguous reports about the cave only appear in the 16th century.

Later, it became a tourist attraction for travelers on the Grand Tour. The CO_{2} gas, being denser than air, tended to accumulate in the deeper parts of the cave. As a result, small animals such as dogs held inside the cave suffered carbon dioxide poisoning, while a standing human was not affected. Local guides, for a fee, would suspend small animals (usually dogs) inside it until they became unconscious. The dogs could be revived by submerging them in the cold waters of the nearby Lake Agnano, although in at least one case this led to the dog drowning instead. Tourists who came to see this attraction included Sir Thomas Browne, Richard Mead, Goethe, John Evelyn, Montesquieu, Alexandre Dumas père, and Mark Twain.

Dutch traveller Cornelis de Bruijn also reported visiting the caves in the year 1677. He wrote:

Next, one comes close to the road by a small cave called Grotta del Cani, which is very venomous, to the extent that if a dog is kept inside, it dies very quickly. I had the curiosity to visit it with two different dogs and found that when the animal remains standing on its legs, it is not harmed by the poison. However, if one forcibly presses it down, it quickly loses its strength after great struggling and desperate resistance, and would undoubtedly die in an instant if not promptly picked up and thrown into a nearby water or lake, where it immediately recovers but with some dizziness, walking like a human who is completely drunk. This lake has the same nature as the cave and boils in several places due to the great heat of sulfur. Curiosity drove me to investigate how high the venom in the cave might be from the ground, so bowing my head downward, I found it to be only one foot high from the ground.

Some tourists including Washington Irving (1804), Percy Bysshe and Mary Shelley (1818) and Ralph Waldo Emerson (1833), objecting to the cruelty, refused to pay for the experiment to be performed on the dog. A Scottish scientist who examined the cave for several days (1877) reported:

On carrying a lighted torch into the cave, its smoke gradually falls, till it reaches the layer of gas, upon which it settles; and on looking in, the surface of the gaseous layer is seen, resembling that of water, and appears covered with beautiful undulations.

On holding the head below the level of the gas, holding the breath, and keeping the eyes open, an intolerable prickling sensation is produced upon the eyes by the carbonic acid.

A dog brought into the cave, as is the custom there, appears, as it were, to drink the gas, lapping with its tongue. Then its eyes begin to dilate to an unnatural size, and its lapping becomes more spasmodic; beyond this it does not seem to suffer. While in the cave, also, the dog was able to stand, but when carried and set on its feet outside in the fresh air, it fell, and lay struggling as if in paroxysms of suffocation, but recovered in two or three minutes. I was told, however, that the animal gets into such a nervous state with the prospects of its frequent ordeals, that it has to be killed in three months.

The lake became polluted, was thought to be malarious, and was drained in 1870. At some point the spectacle fell into disuse, although Baedeker's guides in the 1880s were still advertising that to see the dog experiment would cost tourists 1 lire (≈ 20 U.S. cents). According to one source, it was banned before World War II for cruelty to animals. The cave entrance was blocked to prevent access by children.

In 2001 the cave was investigated by Italian speleologists. Nine metres from its entrance the temperature was 52 °C (126 °F) and the CO_{2} concentration was 80%, with negligible oxygen.

== In popular science ==
The cave was often described in nineteenth century science textbooks to illustrate the density and toxicity of carbon dioxide, and its reputation gave rise to a scientific demonstration of the same name, in which stepped candles are successively extinguished by tipping carbon dioxide into a transparent container.
