= Lake Agnano =

- Lago di Agnano (Italian)
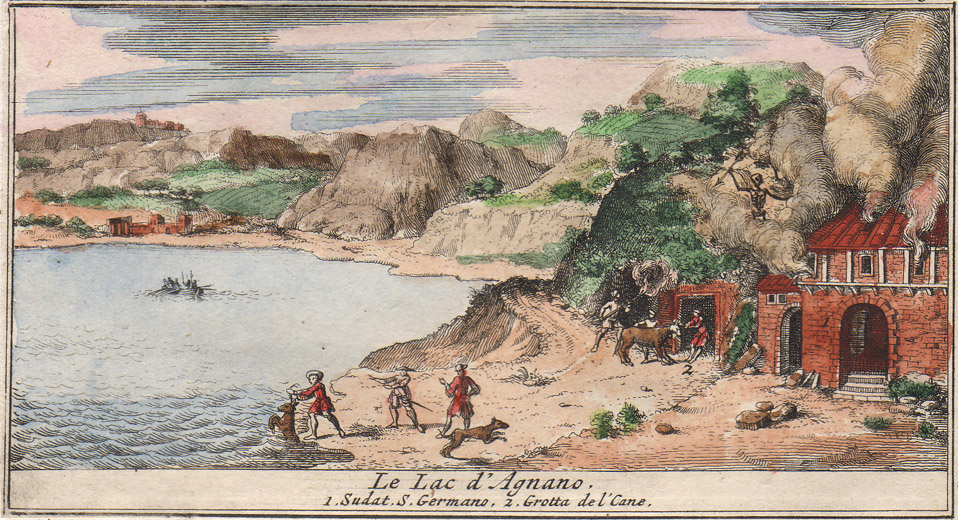
- Lake Agnano, Sudatorio di San Germano, and the Grotta del Cane – Sieur de Rogissar (etching, 1706)

- Location within Campania Location within Italy
- Interactive map of Lake Agnano
- Location: Campania
- Coordinates: 40°49′47″N 14°10′14″E
- Type: Volcanogenic lake Former lake
- Basin countries: Italy

Lago di Agnano or Lake Agnano was a circular lake, some 6½ km in circumference, which occupied the crater of the extinct volcano of Agnano 8 km west of Naples, Italy. It was apparently not formed until the Middle Ages, as it is not mentioned by ancient writers; it was drained in 1870.

On the south bank are the Stufe di San Germano, natural sulphureous vapor baths, and close by is the Grotta del Cane. From the floor of this cave warm carbonic acid gas constantly rises to a height of 18 inches (46 cm): the fumes render a dog insensible in a few seconds. Remains of an extensive Roman building and some statues have been discovered close by.
