= Campanian volcanic arc =

Chain of volcanoes in Italy

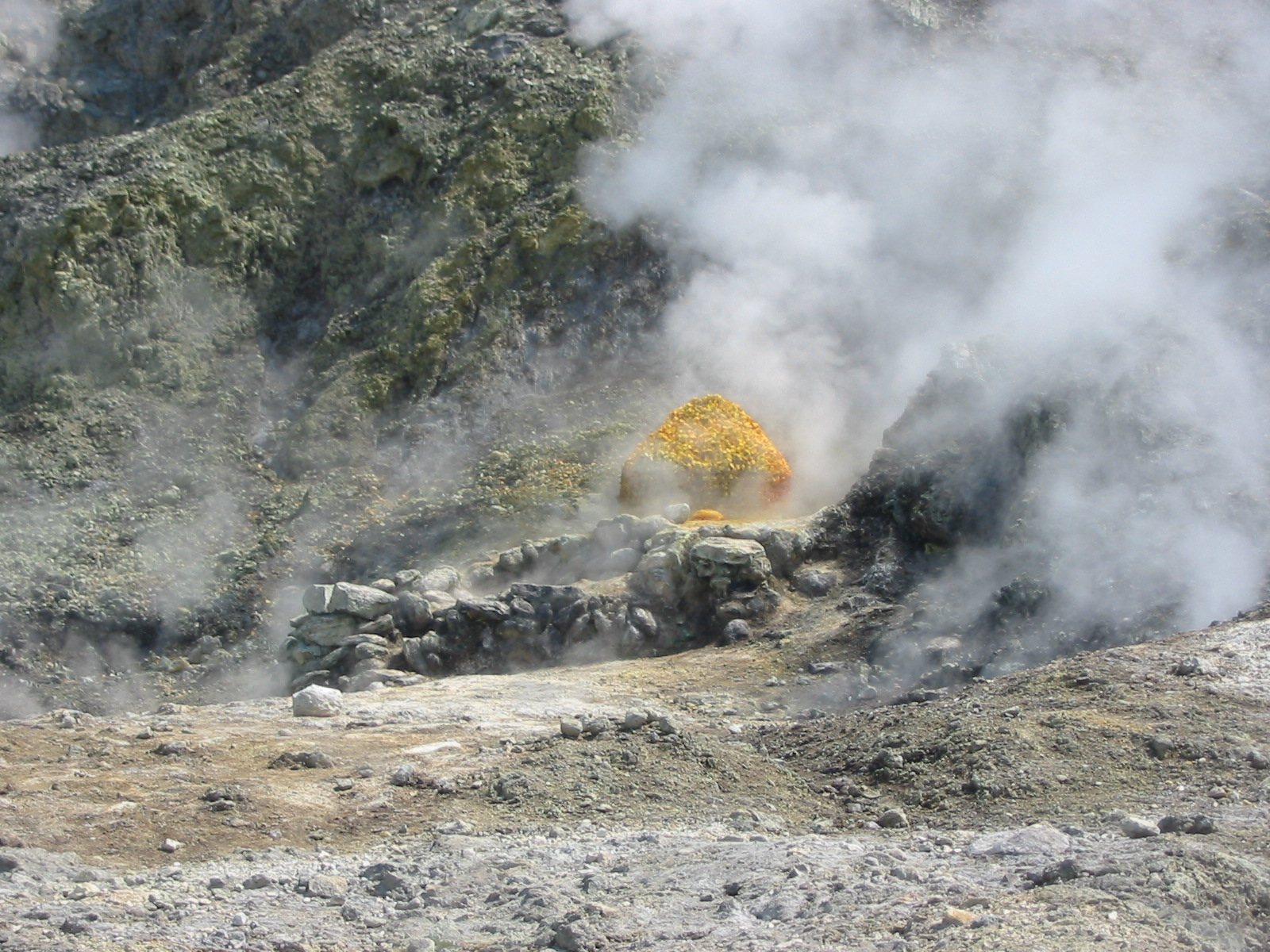
Sulfur at the Solfatara crater

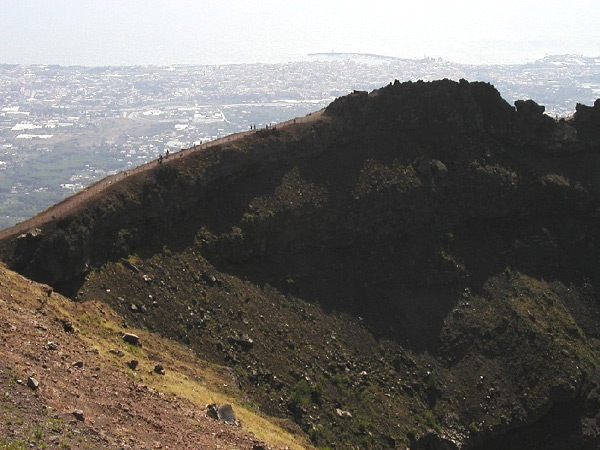
View of the crater wall of Mount Vesuvius, with the city of Torre del Greco in the background

The Campanian volcanic arc is a volcanic arc that consists of a number of active, dormant, and extinct volcanoes in the Campania region of Italy. The Campanian volcanic arc centers on the bay of Naples and includes:

- Mount Vesuvius: an active volcano that last erupted in 1944.
- Phlegraean Fields: a huge, ancient caldera containing the western area of Naples. The area is a collection of numerous extinct craters that are evidence of ancient eruptions; however, also included in this area is Solfatara, a shallow volcanic crater still emitting jets of sulfur fumes and, thus, still active.
- Ischia: an island 20 kilometres west of Naples, it last erupted in 1302.
- Palinuro, Vavilev, Marsili, and Magnaghi: undersea extinct or dormant volcanoes south of Vesuvius. The last three were discovered in the 1950s and bear the names of the geologists who discovered them. Palinuro was known earlier. As of 2006, there was some concern about the state of "dormancy" of Marsili, which is 3,000 meters high with the cone reaching to 500 meters from the surface of the water. Satellite cones of recent origin have been detected on Marsili.

"Campanian volcanic arc" is something of a term of convenience, since the area is part of the same large area of intense volcanic and seismic activity that includes, further to the south, the active island volcanoes of Stromboli, and Vulcano off the north coast of Sicily and even the largest active volcano in Europe, Mount Etna, on Sicily.

== See also ==
- Volcanology of Italy
