= Solfatara (volcano) =

Italian volcano near Naples

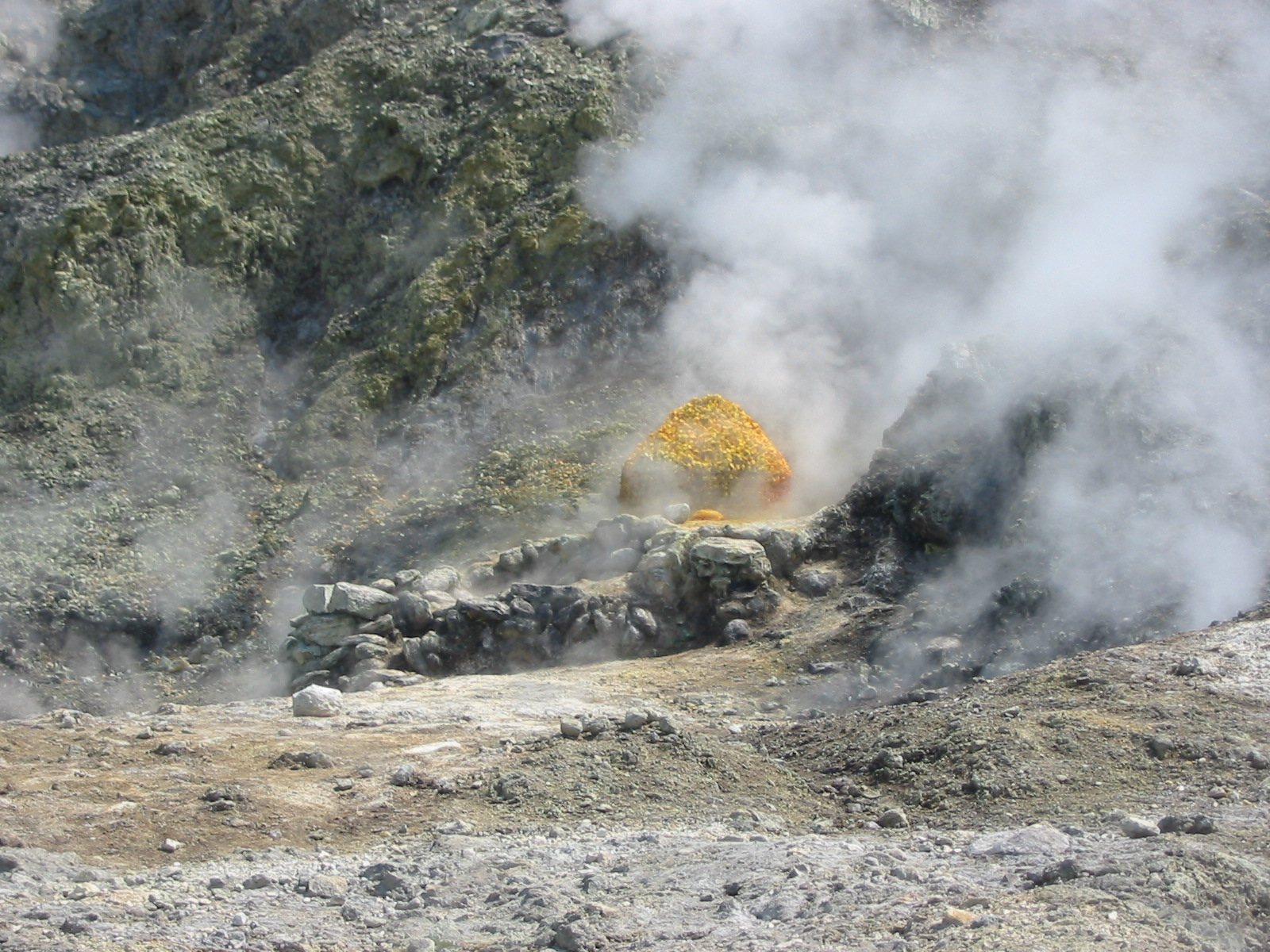
- Sulphur and fumaroles at the Solfatara crater

Highest point
- Elevation: 458 m (1,503 ft)
- Coordinates: 40.827°N 14.139°E

Geography
- Location: Italy

Geology
- Rock age: 40,000 years
- Mountain type: Crater of Campi Flegrei
- Volcanic arc: Campanian volcanic arc
- Volcanic field: Phlegraean Fields
- Last eruption: 1198

Solfatara (Italian: Solfatara di Pozzuoli) is a shallow volcanic crater at Pozzuoli, near Naples, part of the Phlegraean Fields (Italian: Campi Flegrei) volcanic area. It is a volcano, which emits jets of steam with sulfurous fumes. The name comes from the Latin, Sulpha terra, "land of sulfur", or "sulfur earth". It was formed around 4000 years ago and last erupted in 1198 with what was probably a phreatic eruption – an explosive steam-driven eruption caused when groundwater interacts with magma. The crater floor was a popular tourist attraction until 2017, as it has many fumaroles and mud pools. The area is well known for its bradyseism. The vapours had been used for medical purposes since Roman times.

This volcano is where the thermoacidophilic archaeon Sulfolobus solfataricus was first isolated. The archaeon is named for the volcano, as most species of the genus Sulfolobus are named for the area where they are first isolated.

== Notable events ==
Saint Proculus (the patron saint of Pozzuoli) and Saint Januarius (the patron saint of Naples) were beheaded at Solfatara in 305.

In 2017, three people—an 11-year-old boy and his parents—died, when they fell into a chasm. Initial rumors that claimed that the boy had entered an off-limits area of the crater were declared false by an eyewitness who had watched the scene unfold from her balcony. According to the eyewitness, the family were on the official walking path, when the 11-year-old slipped into the unsecured chasm. His parents died in an attempt to save him. The only survivor was the boy's 7-year-old brother.

== Gallery ==
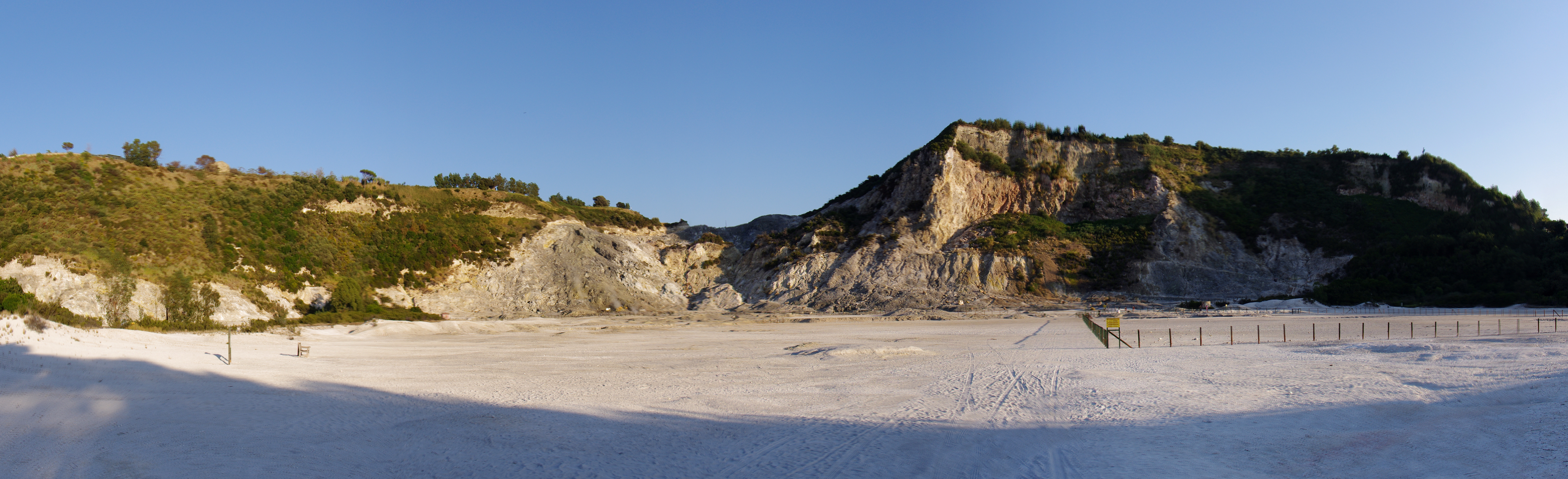
Panoramic view of the crater towards the southeast

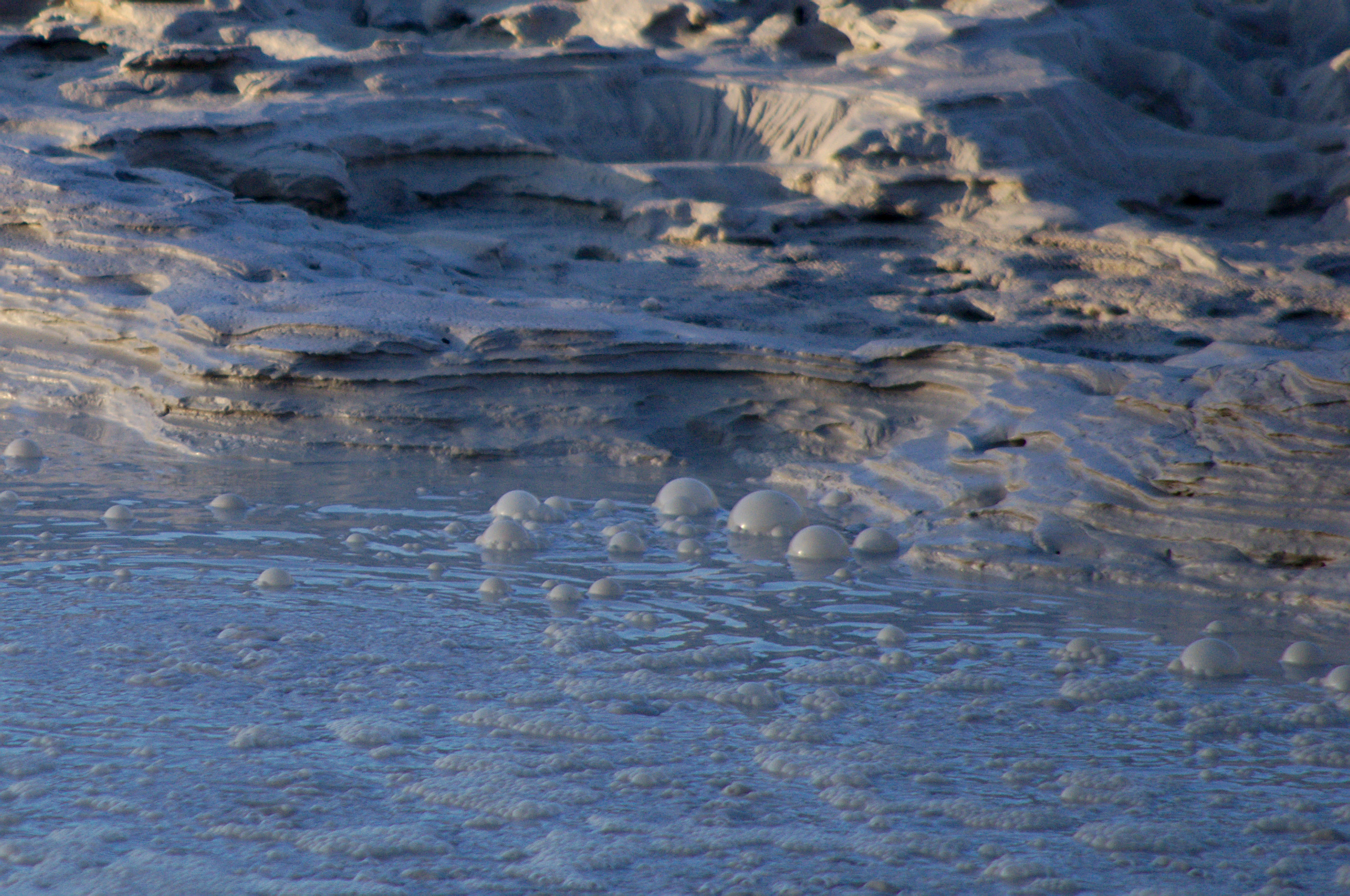
Close-up view of a mud pool

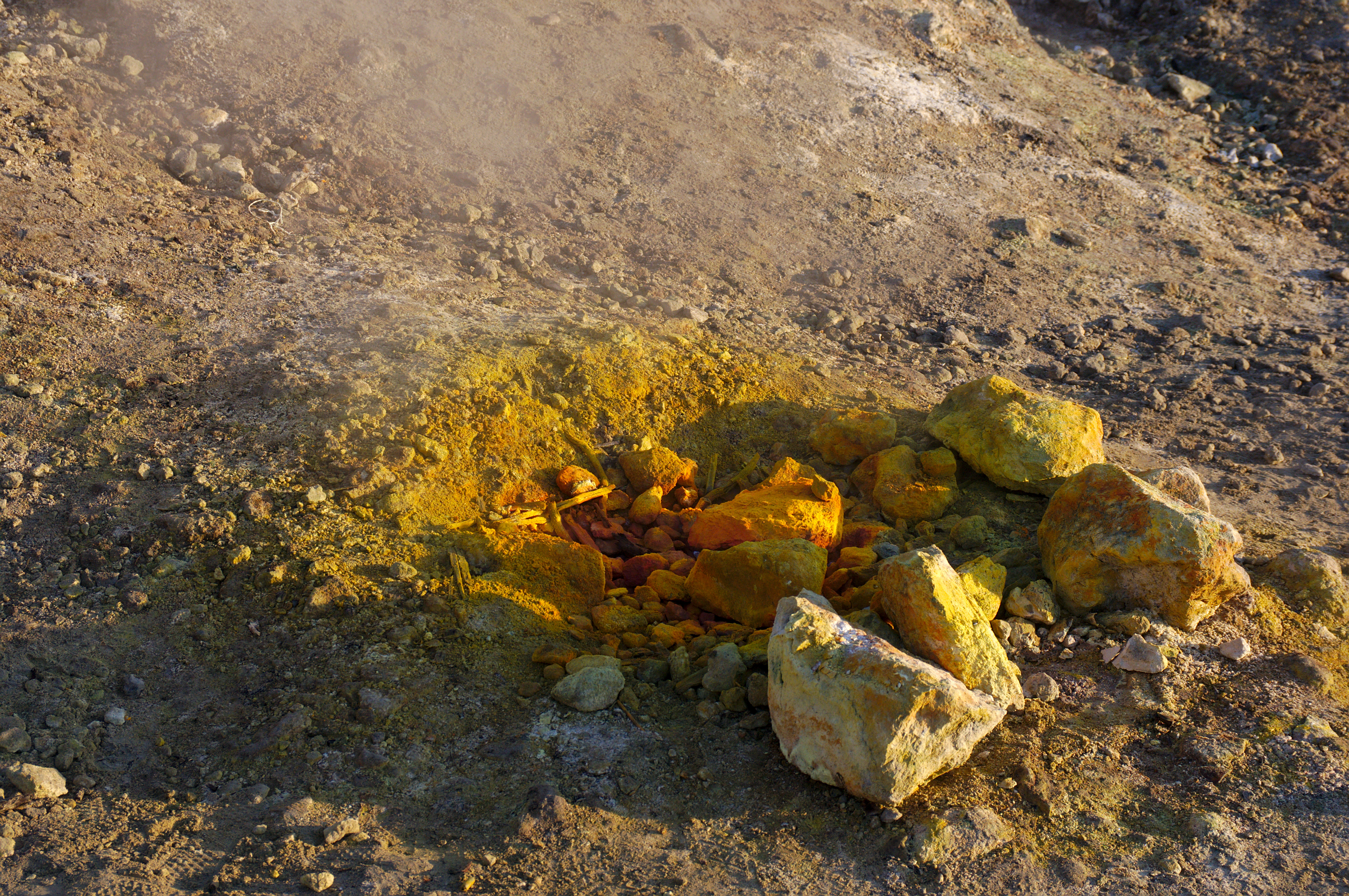
Medium size fumarole in Solfatara

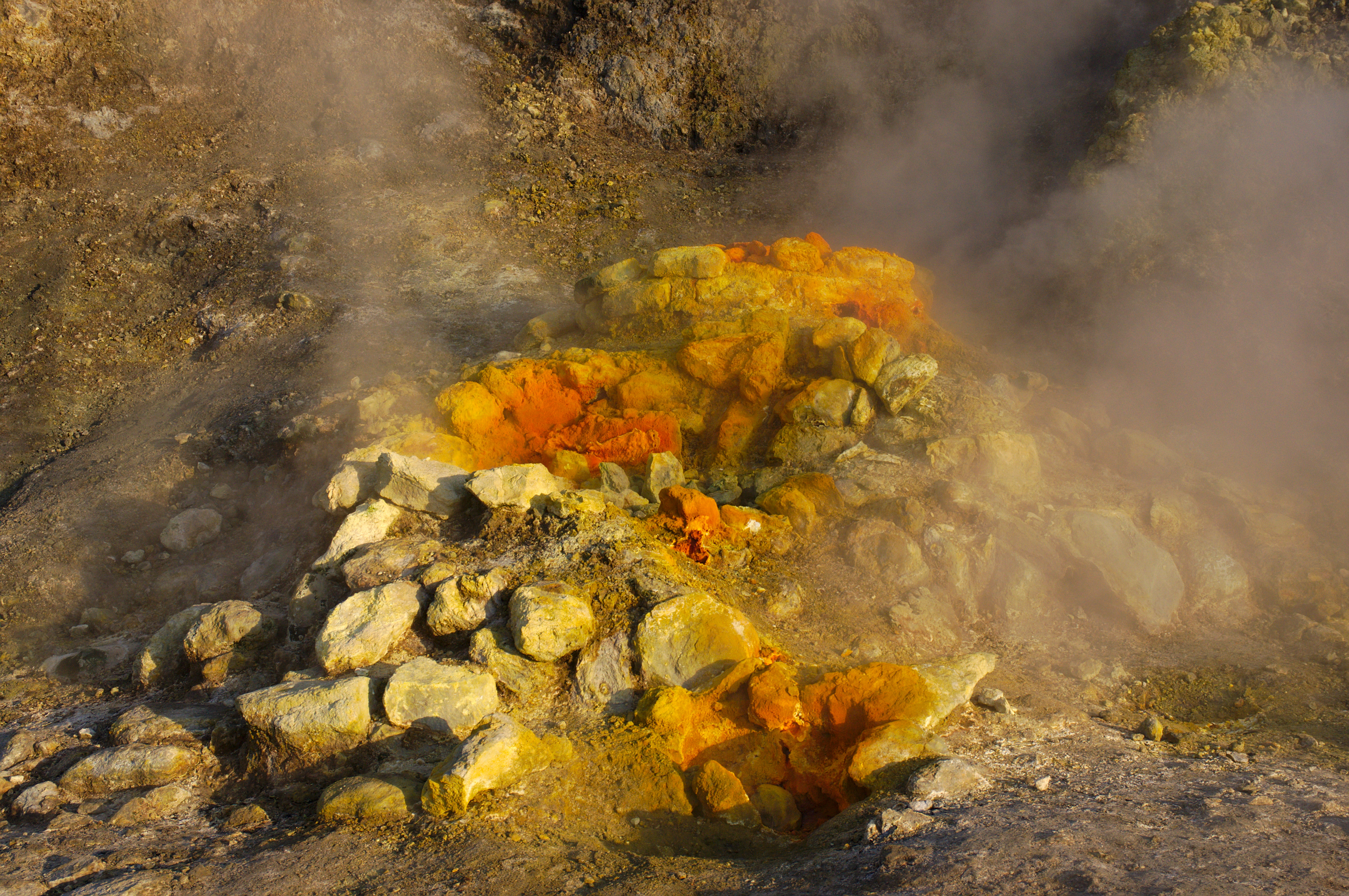
Biggest fumarole in Solfatara

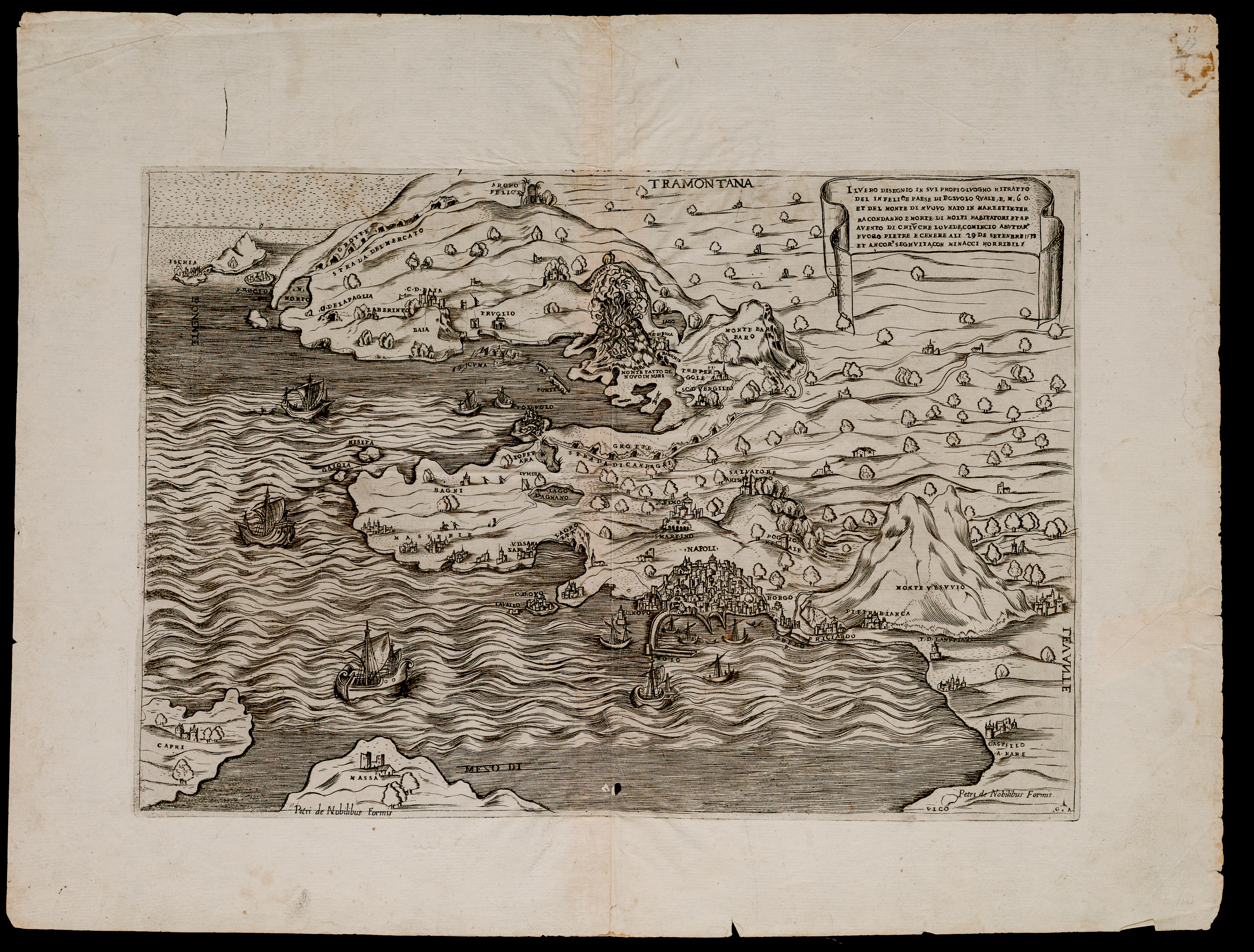
Map of the Campania region showing the 1538 eruption of the Solfatara volcano northeast of Pozzuoli near Naples. 1 map ; 289 x 423 mm (neat line), 295 x 428 mm (plate mark). Forms part of the Franco Novacco Map Collection at the Newberry Library.

== See also ==
- List of volcanoes in Italy
