= Macellum of Pozzuoli =

Roman market building in Pozzuoli, Italy

Coordinates: 40°49′34″N 14°07′14″E

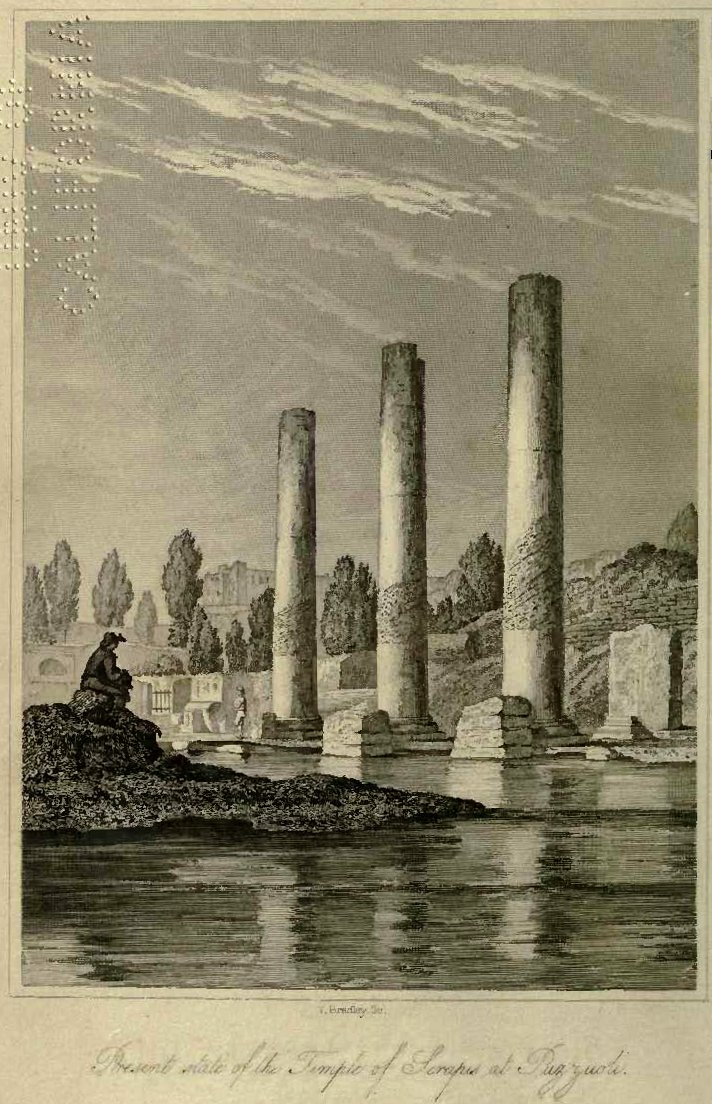
Frontispiece of Charles Lyell's Principles of Geology of 1830, "carefully reduced from that given by the Canonico Andrea de Jorio in his Ricerche sul Tempio di Serapide, in Puzzuoli. Napoli, 1820, which had been based on a drawing by John Izard Middleton.

The Macellum of Pozzuoli (Italian: Macellum di Pozzuoli) was the macellum or market building of the Roman colony of Puteoli, now the city of Pozzuoli in southern Italy. When first excavated in the 18th century, the discovery of a statue of Serapis led to the building being misidentified as the city's serapeum or Temple of Serapis.

A band of borings or Gastrochaenolites left by marine Lithophaga bivalve molluscs on three standing marble columns indicated that these columns had remained upright over centuries while the site sank below sea level, then re-emerged. This puzzling feature was the subject of debate in early geology, and eventually led to the identification of bradyseism in the area, showing that the Earth's crust could be subject to gradual movement without destructive earthquakes.

== Roman origins ==
The city of Dicaearchia, founded by Greek refugees escaping dictatorship on Samos, was integrated into the Roman Empire as the city of Puteoli in 194 BC. The macellum or food market was built between the late first and early second century AD, and restored during the third century AD under the Severan dynasty.

The building was in the form of an arcaded square courtyard, surrounded by two-storey buildings. Shops lined the marble floored colonnade forming an arcade with 34 grey granite columns. The main entrance and vestibule were positioned on a main axis, which lined up across a tholos in the centre of the square to the exedra for worship which had a portico formed by four large cipollino marble columns. The exedra had three niches for statues of divinities giving protection to the market, including the sculpture of Serapis. The tholos in the centre of the square was a circular building standing on a podium reached by four symmetrically placed access stairways, with sixteen African marble columns supporting a domed vault. Marine animals decorated friezes around the base of the tholos. The courtyard had four secondary entrances on its longer sides, with latrines in the corners of the colonnade and four (probable) tabernae with their own external entrances as well as access from the arcade.

== Excavation and influence on geology ==
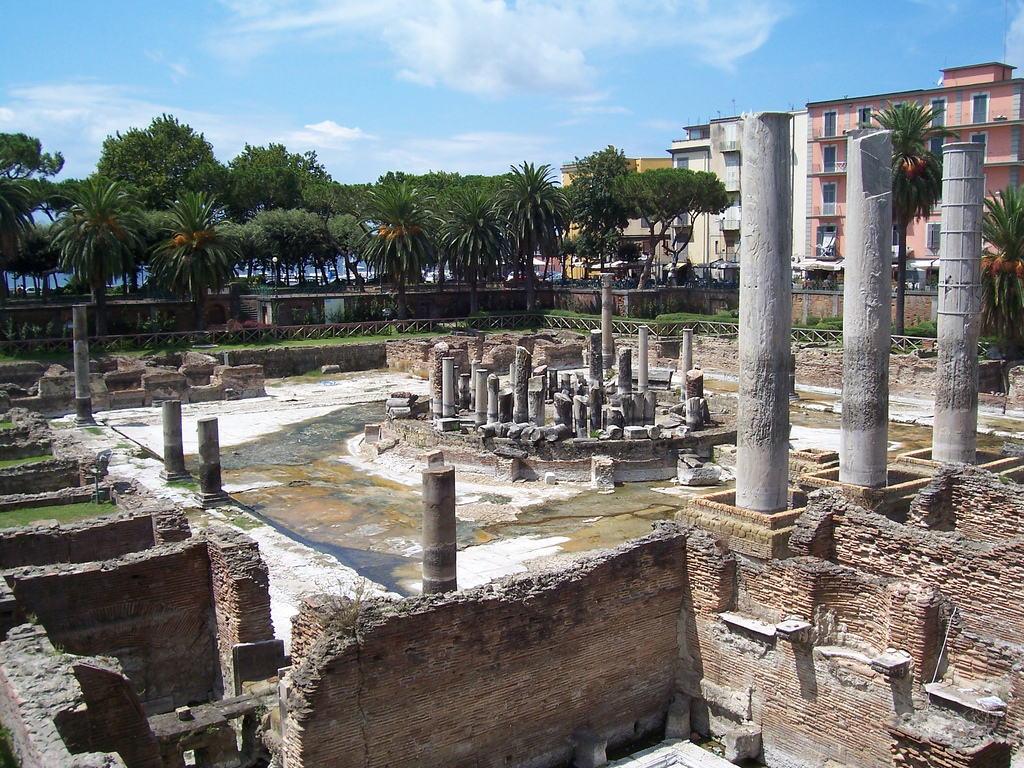
The macellum in 2004

King Charles of Naples had excavations carried out between 1750 and 1756, exposing the three large cipollino marble columns which gave the site its name of the "three column vineyard". It attracted visits from antiquarians, among them William Hamilton whose Campi Phlegraei of 1776 showed a distant view of the buildings dry above sea level, and John Soane who "Went to the Temple of Jupiter Serapis" on 1 January 1779 and made rough sketches, as well as a plan of the complex, possibly copied from another drawing.

In 1798, Scipione Breislak described his fieldwork at the site in his Topografia fisica della Campania, and theorised about changes in sea level around that coast. He argued that the evidence did not support the suggestion of falling sea levels worldwide, but thought seismic explanations were inadequate as earthquakes notoriously shook buildings until they collapsed, and the columns were still standing. He concluded that there must have been undetectable movement of the crust of the Earth, but recognised that this was unsatisfactory as the cause could not be seen. In 1802, John Playfair, in his Illustrations of the Huttonian Theory of the Earth, used Breislak's descriptions to support James Hutton's ideas of slow changes, attributing the differing heights of water around the columns to "oscillations" in the level of the land.

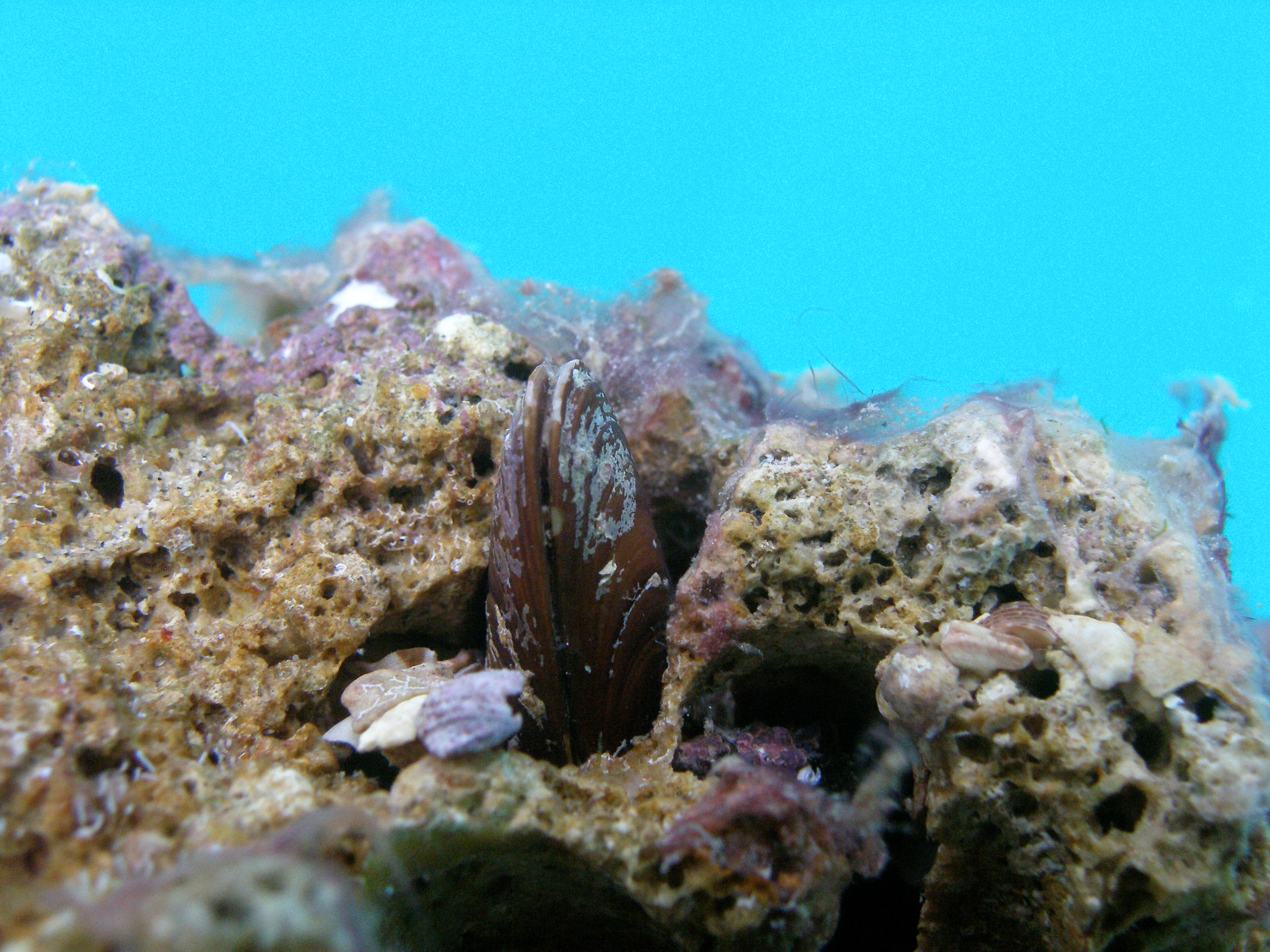
Lithophaga molluscs bore into rocks or corals, forming shallow holes called gastrochaenolites.

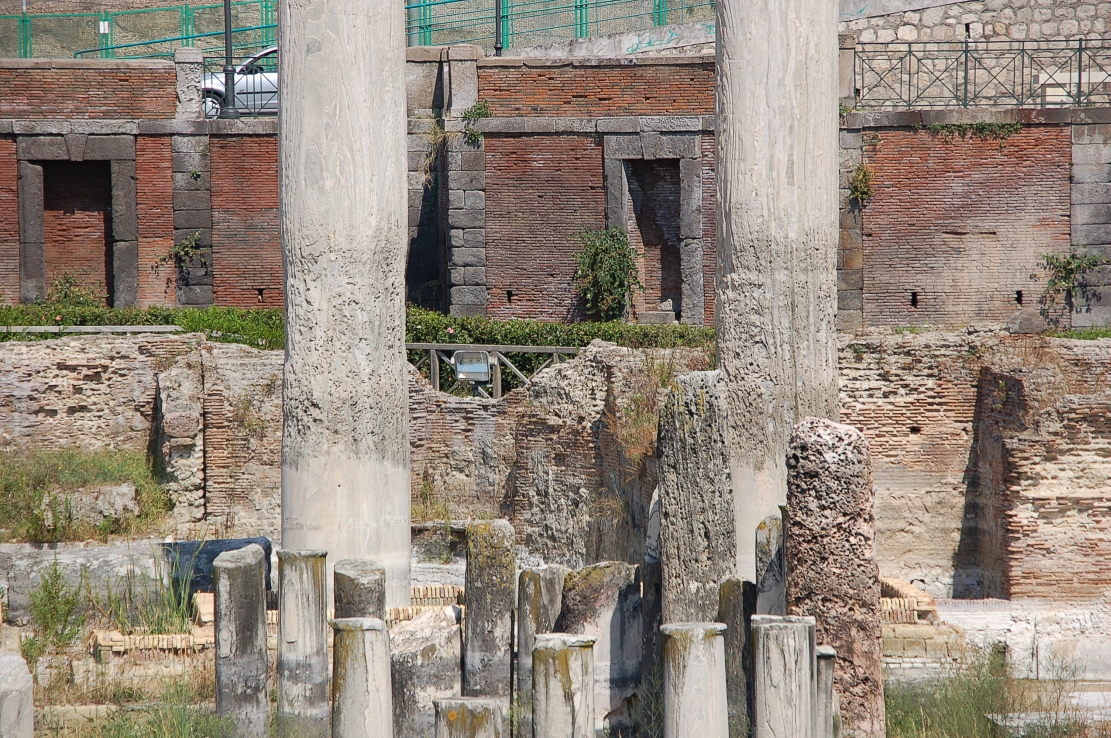
View across the marketplace to two of the columns, showing the bands of mollusc holes.

Between 1806 and 1818 further excavations exposed the whole of the "Serapeum" or "Temple of Serapis". The excavations lost stratigraphic information in the deposits which had buried the building, but the band of borings or gastrochaenolites left by marine Lithophaga bivalves on the three standing marble columns provided a good record of relative sea level variation.

The antiquarian Andrea di Jorio studied the ruins, and in 1817 published a guidebook to the Phlegraean Fields, with a map of the area which had many hot springs and volcanic craters as well as antiquarian sites including the supposed Temple. By this time the pavement was flooded by the sea, indicating a slight lowering of the land level. In 1820, he published a study of his Ricerche sul Tempio di Serapide, in Puzzuoli, including an illustration based on a drawing by John Izard Middleton showing the three columns with the bands affected by molluscs.

In 1819, Giovanni Battista Brocchi proposed that the columns below the bands had been protected from the molluscs by being buried in silt or volcanic ash. The first volume of Veränderungen der Erdoberfläche by Karl Ernst Adolf von Hoff, published in 1822, included an account of the ruins as demonstrating relative changes in land and sea level. Hoff's second volume of 1824 reviewed how earthquakes might have caused this, and mentioned Jorio's study. Hoff's account motivated Johann Wolfgang von Goethe to publish his own idea, coined when he visited the site in 1787. In Goethe's 1823 Architektonisch-naturhistorisches Problem, he suggested that silt or ash had partially buried the columns and at the same time held back water forming a lagoon above sea level. Robert Jameson had this paper translated for his Edinburgh journal, to oppose Playfair's views. Other naturalists thought this unlikely, as the fresh water lagoon would not have supported marine molluscs, and the sea was by then higher than at the time of Goethe's visit.

In his 1826 book A Description of Active and Extinct Volcanoes, Charles Daubeny dismissed the implied sinking of the land by 30 feet (9.1 m) followed by almost as great a rise as unlikely, since "it is probable that not a single pillar of the temple would now retain its erect posture to attest the reality of these convulsions". Daubeny also doubted changing sea levels, so concluded that the bands of holes bored by molluscs must be due to local damming of water around the buildings.

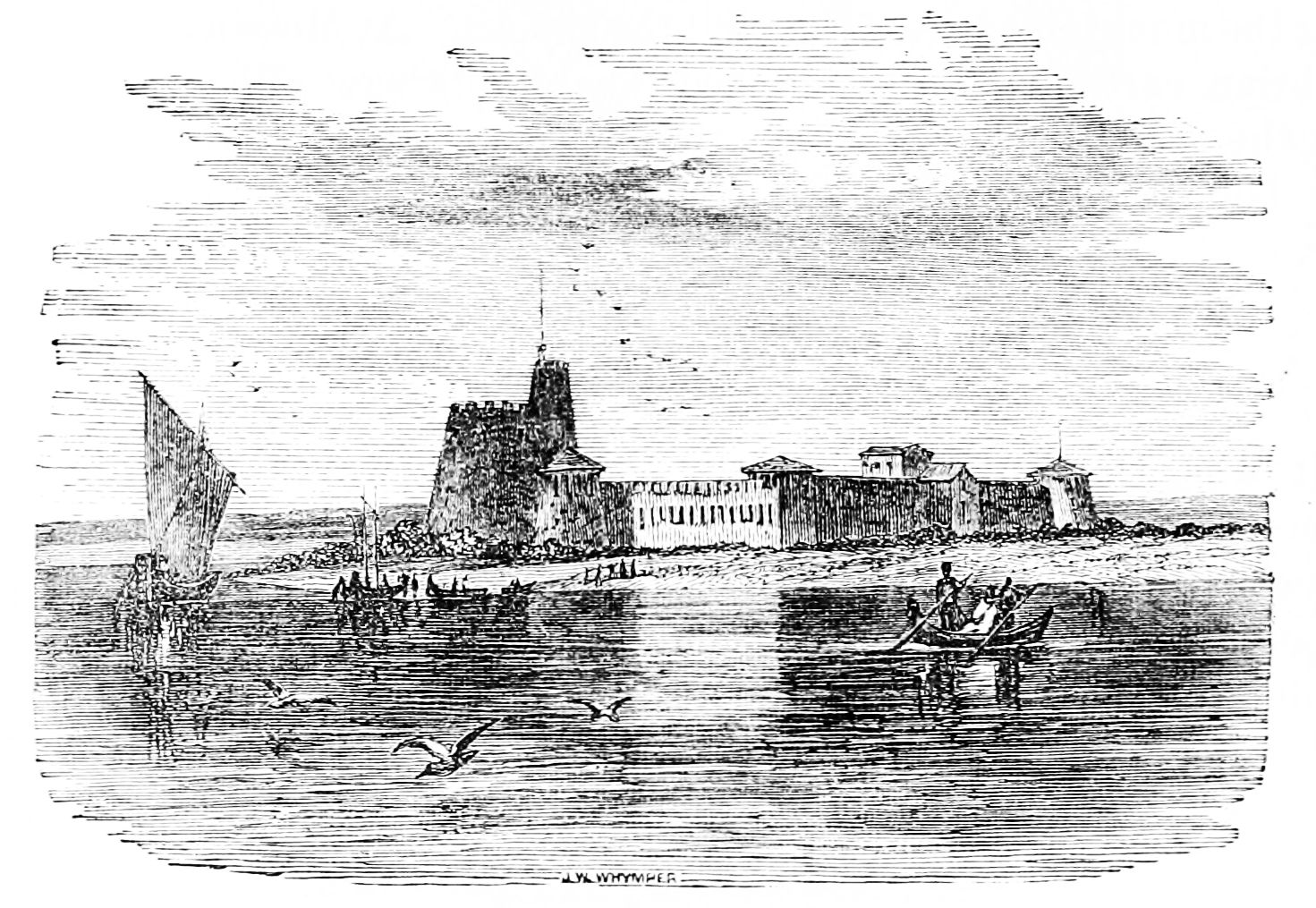
Fort of Sindree before the earthquake.

Charles Lyell's Principles of Geology of 1830 featured as its frontispiece a replication of di Jorio's illustration of the columns (shown above), and a detailed section discussing their significance. He strongly contested Daubeny's argument, and instead proposed slow and steady geological forces. Lyell wrote "That buildings should have been submerged, and afterwards upheaved, without being entirely reduced to a heap of ruins, will appear no anomaly, when we recollect that in the year 1819, when the delta of the Indus sank down, the houses within the fort of Sindree subsided beneath the waves without being overthrown." In 1832 the young Charles Darwin used Lyell's methods at the first landfall of the Beagle survey voyage, while considering evidence of land rising up at St. Jago. In his journal, Darwin dismissed Daubeny's argument, and wrote that he felt "sure at St Jago in some places a town might have been raised without injuring a house."

Charles Babbage carried out a detailed survey of the ruins in 1828 and his Observations on the Temple of Serapis at Pozzuoli, near Naples were published in 1847. In some of the rooms of the macellum Babbage found a dark brownish encrustation of salts, and a thicker encrustation up to a height of about 9 feet (2.7 m) from floor level. These have been interpreted as showing that as the building lowered, a little lake formed and allowed water to enter the building without there being a direct connection to the sea, then at a later stage the land subsided to the point where sea water came in, and the Lithophaga started drilling holes in the masonry up to 19 feet (5.8 m) from floor level.

The identification of the building as a macellum or marketplace rather than a temple was made by Charles Dubois, who published a detailed account of the ruins of Pozzuoli in his Pouzzoles antiques. Histoire et topographie of 1907.

== Modern investigations ==
More recent investigations of the vertical movements have shown that the site is near the centre of the Campi Flegrei (Phlegraean Fields) caldera and has been subject to repeated "slow earthquakes" or bradyseism of this shallow caldera resulting in relatively slow subsidence over long periods, drowning the ruin, punctuated by periods of relatively rapid uplift that caused it to re-emerge. After a long subsidence through Roman times, there was a period of uplift in the Middle Ages around AD 700 to 800, then after more subsidence the land rose again from around 1500 up to the last eruption in 1538. The land again subsided gradually, then between 1969 and 1973 the land rose by about 1.7 metres (5.6 ft). Over the following decade there was a little subsidence, then between 1982 and 1994 there was uplift of almost 2 metres (6.6 ft). Concerns about risks of earthquake damage and possible eruption led to temporary evacuation of the city of Pozzuoli. Detailed measurements indicated that the caldera deformation formed a nearly circular lens centred near Pozzuoli. Various models have been produced to find mechanisms explaining this pattern.

Panorama of the macellum

== Sources ==
- Herbert, Sandra (1991), "Charles Darwin as a Prospective Geological Author", The British Journal for the History of Science, vol. 24, no. 2, Cambridge University Press, The British Society for the History of Science, pp. 159–192, doi:10.1017/s0007087400027060, JSTOR 4027165
- Herbert, Sandra (2005), Charles Darwin, Geologist, Ithaca, N.Y: Cornell University Press, ISBN 0-8014-4348-2
- Lyell, Charles (1830), Principles of Geology, vol. 1, London: John Murray
