= Principles of Geology =

English-language three-volume science book by Charles Lyell, published 1830-33

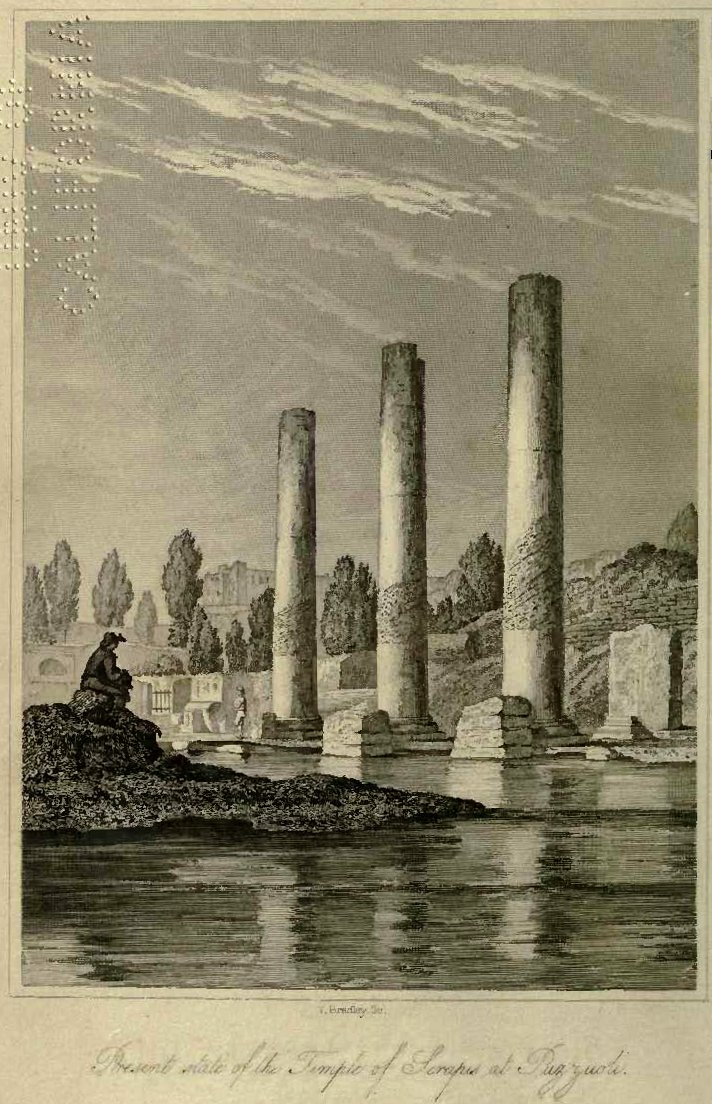
The frontispiece showing the Temple of Serapis was carefully reduced from that given by the Canonico Andrea de Jorio in his Ricerche sul Tempio di Serapide, in Puzzuoli. Napoli, 1820, which was based on a drawing by John Izard Middleton.

Principles of Geology: Being an Attempt to Explain the Former Changes of the Earth's Surface, by Reference to Causes Now in Operation is a book by the Scottish geologist Charles Lyell that was first published in 3 volumes from 1830 to 1833. Lyell used the theory of uniformitarianism to describe how the Earth's surface was changing over time. This theory was in direct contrast to the geological theory of catastrophism.

Many individuals believed in catastrophism to allow room for religious beliefs. For example, the Genesis flood narrative could be described as a real geological event as catastrophism describes the changing of the Earth surface as one-time, violent events. Lyell challenged the believers of the catastrophic theory by studying Mount Etna in Sicily and describing the changes from one stratum to another and the fossil records within the rocks to prove that slow, gradual changes were the cause of the ever-changing Earth's surface. Lyell used geological evidence to determine that the Earth was older than 6,000 years, as had been previously contested. The book shows that the processes that are occurring in the present are the same processes that occurred in the past.

== Frontispiece ==
The frontispiece of first volume of Principles of Geology, featured an illustration of three pillars of the Temple of Serapis with holes made by mollusks, indicating their past habitation when the columns were submerged underwater. This fascinated early geologists because the pillars had experienced periodic submergence and emergence while remaining upright. It was later understood that the movement of magma beneath the Earth's crust caused the ground to rise and fall, consequently shifting the columns. Lyell interpreted this depiction as concrete evidence of how gradual and consistent processes could shape the Earth's terrain over extended periods of time.

== Book ==
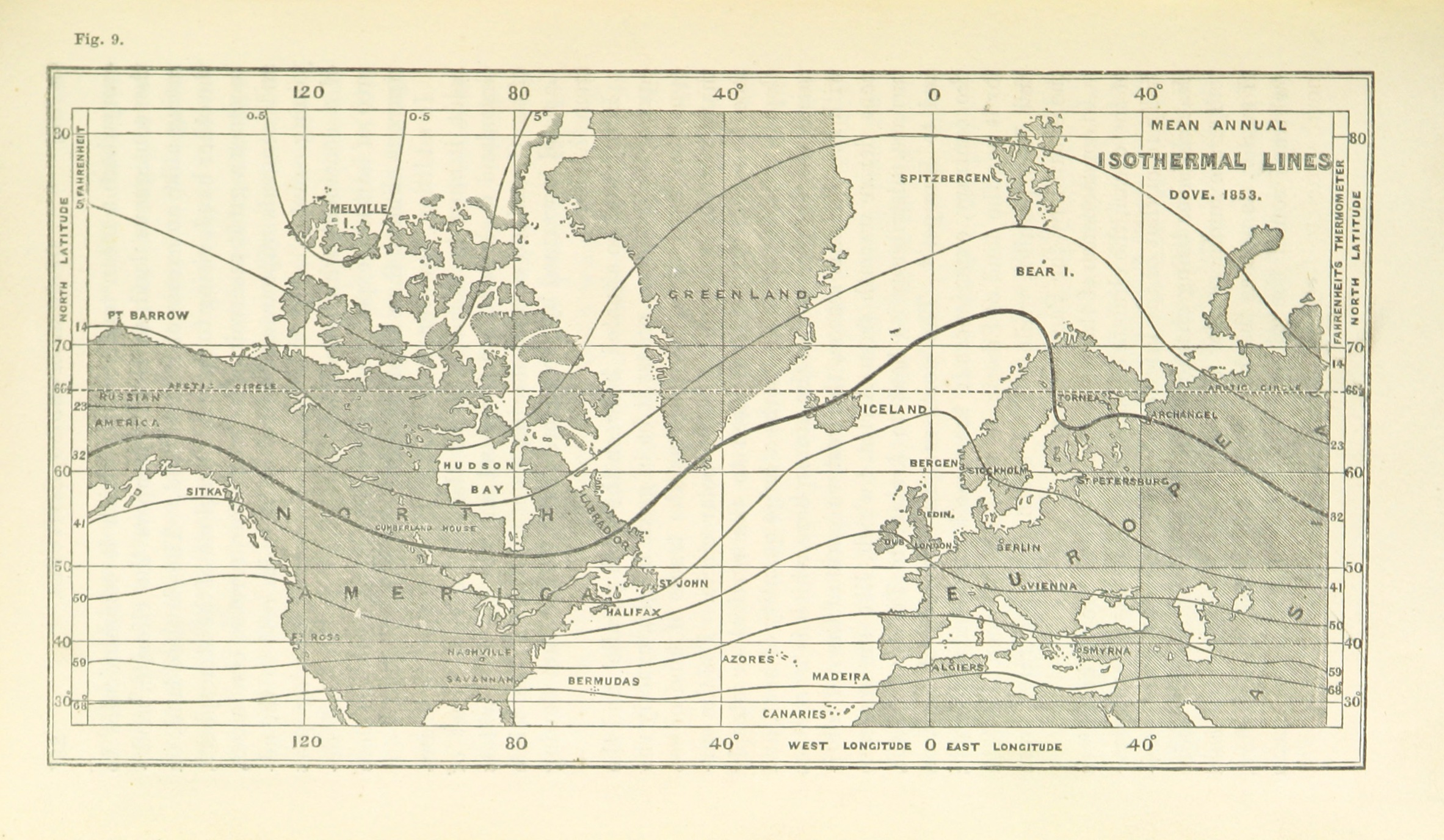
Map of isothermal lines across North America and Europe from Lyell's Principles of Geology (6th edition)

Published in three volumes in 1830–1833 by John Murray, the book established Lyell's credentials as an important geological theorist and popularized the doctrine of uniformitarianism (first suggested by James Hutton in Theory of the Earth published in 1795). The central argument in Principles was that "the present is the key to the past": that geological remains from the distant past could, and should, be explained by reference to geological processes now in operation and thus directly observable.

The book is notable for being one of the first to use the term "evolution" in the context of biological speciation.

In Lyell's work, he described the three rules he believes to cause the steady change of the Earth. The first rule is that geologic change comes from slow and continual procedures that have been happening over a long period of time. This rule is the basic ideal of Uniformitarianism and it is easy to understand why this was a rule. The second rule is that all the forces that affect the geology of the Earth come from the Earth. The third rule is that celestial cycles do not impact the patterns of Earth's geologic record. Rule two and rule three go together because Lyell thought that only forces on the Earth cause changes to Earth's geology, and nothing else.

Volume 1 introduces Lyell's theory of uniformitarianism. He develops and argues that the earthly processes that we see in the present were the same processes as in the past and caused the Earth to look like it does today. This volume is what Darwin took with him on his voyage on the Beagle. Volume 2 builds off of the uniformitarianism theory in volume 1, but focuses more on the organic matter rather than the inorganic matter. In the 3rd volume, Lyell identifies four periods of the Tertiary: Newer Pliocene, Older Pliocene, Miocene, and the Eocene. Lyell used deposits and fossils from these periods to argue for uniformity during the Tertiary. This also talks about the grammar or syntax of the processes that occurred in the past in today's language.

== Influence ==
Lyell's interpretation of geologic change as the steady accumulation of minute changes over enormously long spans of time, a central theme in the Principles, influenced the 22-year-old Charles Darwin, who was given the first volume of the first edition by Robert FitzRoy, captain of HMS Beagle, just before they set out (December 1831) on the ship's second voyage. On their first stop ashore at St Jago, Darwin found rock formations which—seen "through Lyell's eyes"—gave him a revolutionary insight into the geological history of the island, an insight he applied throughout his travels.

While in South America, Darwin received the second volume, which rejected the idea of organic evolution, proposing "Centres of Creation" to explain diversity and territory of species. Darwin's ideas gradually moved beyond this, but in geology he operated very much as Lyell's disciple and sent home extensive evidence and theorizing supporting Lyell's uniformitarianism, including Darwin's ideas about the formation of atolls.

== Criticism ==
Charles Lyell's Principles of Geology was met with a lot of criticism when it was first published. The main argument against Lyell is that he took an a priori approach in his work. This means that Lyell was pulling from a theoretical idea instead of pulling from empirical evidence to explain what was occurring in the geological world. One opponent of Principles of Geology that agreed with this point was Adam Sedgwick. This opposition from Sedgwick comes from his thinking that evidence is all that is needed to support an idea, and that the evidence of geologic events points to a catastrophic event. The criticism of Lyell and his work continued into the 20th century. These arguments agreed with the a priori argument, but continued on to say that Lyell combined the empirical evidence with the scientific explanation of geology that was accepted at the time.

The a priori argument is not the only argument that Lyell faced for his work. In 1812, Baron Georges Cuvier argued against uniformitarianism with the results of his study of the Paris Basin. Cuvier and his colleagues found long periods of consistent change with intermittent patterns of sudden fossil disappearance in the geologic record for the area, which is now known as mass extinction. Cuvier explained these sudden changes in the geologic record with catastrophic forces. Lyell responded to this argument, stating that the geologic record was "grossly imperfect" and that observations cannot be trusted if they go against "the plan of Nature".

In recent years, geologists have begun to question the laws of uniformitarianism Lyell laid out. There is now clear evidence of catastrophic change caused by volcanic eruptions, large earthquakes, and asteroid impacts. Moreover, there is evidence that certain cataclysmic occurrences that left marks in the geological and fossil records may correspond to the periodicity of the Solar System's 26-million-year cycle of movement around the galactic core of the Milky Way. Even if catastrophes are rare, their magnitude may affect geology more than has been appreciated under Lyell's version of uniformitarianism.

== Editions ==
1. 1st edition, 2 volumes: volume 1 (January 1830), volume 2 (January 1832)
2. 2nd edition, 3 volumes: volume 1 (1832), volume 2 (January 1833), volume 3 (May 1833)
3. 3rd edition, 4 volumes (May 1834) 1 2 3 4
4. 4th edition, 4 volumes (June 1835) 1 2 3 4
5. 5th edition, 4 volumes (March 1837) 1 2 3 4 (Charles Darwin's copy)
6. 6th edition, 3 volumes (June 1840) 1 2 3
7. 7th edition (February 1847)
8. 8th edition (May 1850)
9. 9th edition (June 1853)
10. 10th edition, 2 volumes volume 1 (1867) volume 2 (1868)
11. 11th edition, 2 volumes (1872) 1 2
12. 12th edition, 2 volumes (1875) - posthumous 1 2
