= Bradyseism =

Motion of Earth's surface caused by volcanic activity

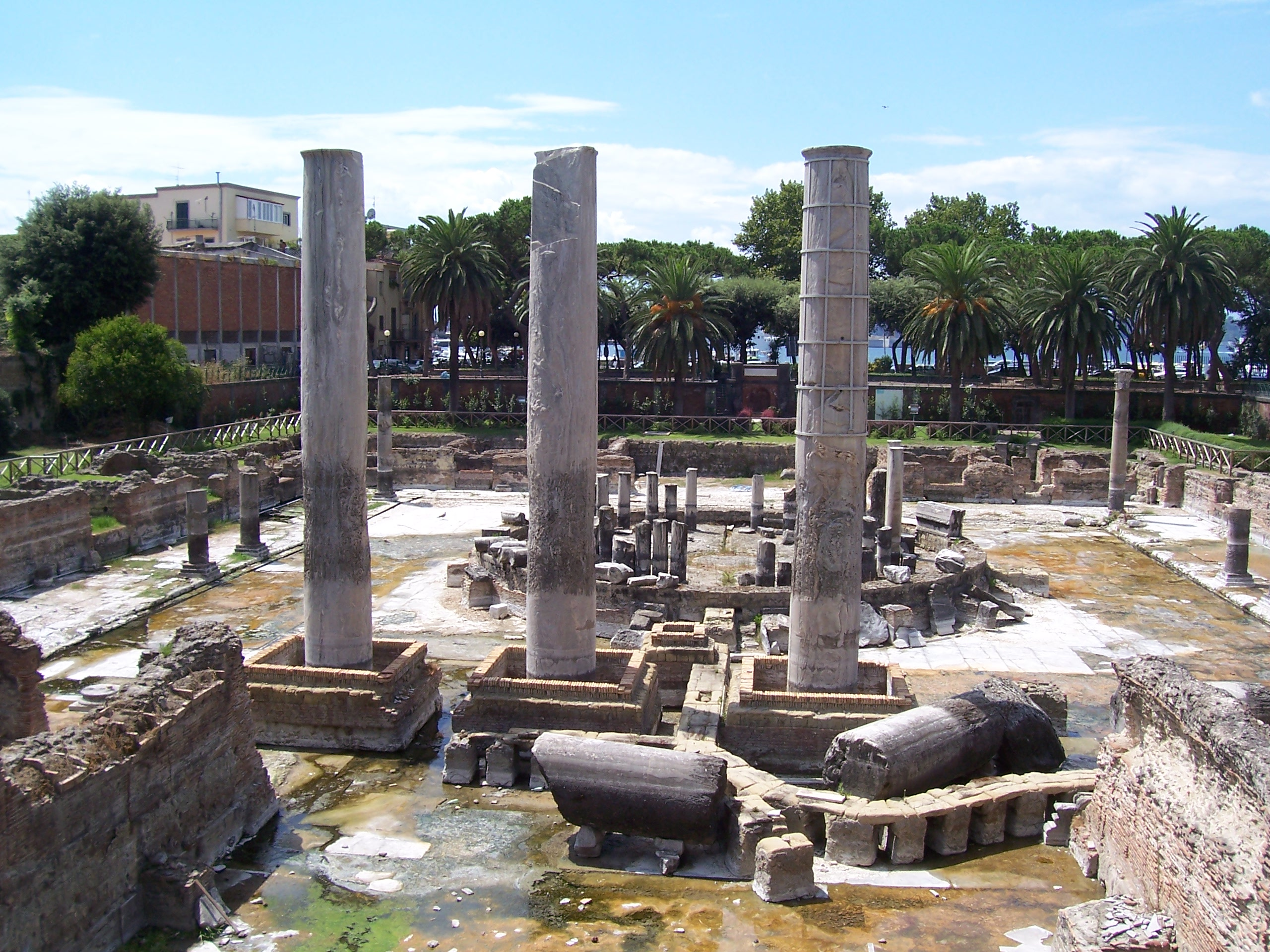
The "Serapium" or Macellum of Pozzuoli demonstrated the effects of bradyseism.

Bradyseism is the gradual uplift (positive bradyseism) or descent (negative bradyseism) of part of the Earth's surface caused by the filling or emptying of an underground magma chamber or hydrothermal activity, particularly in volcanic calderas. It can persist for millennia in between eruptions and each uplift event is normally accompanied by thousands of small to moderate earthquakes. The word derives from the ancient Greek words βραδύς bradús, meaning "slow", and σεισμός seismós meaning "movement", and was coined by Arturo Issel in 1883.

== Phlegraean Fields ==
The area of Phlegraean Fields (Campi Flegrei), near Naples, is a collapsed caldera, namely a volcanic area formed by several volcanic edifices, which includes the Solfatara volcano, well known for its fumaroles. The Campi Flegrei area is especially noted for bradyseismic uplift and subsidence. The inflation and deflation of this caldera is especially well documented due to its seaside location and a long history of habitation and construction in the area.

In particular, the town of Pozzuoli features the Roman Macellum of Pozzuoli in which three marble columns show bands of boreholes or Gastrochaenolites left by marine Lithophaga molluscs. These occur up to 7 metres up the columns, showing how bradyseism in the area lowered the land to at least this depth under the sea and subsequently raised it again.

More recently, between 1968 and 1972, the Campi Flegrei area suffered an episode of positive bradyseism and rose by 1.7 metres. Another rise of 1.8 metres occurred between 1982 and 1984. This correlated with a shallow (4 km deep) earthquake swarm during the same period, which led to the evacuation of 30,000 people due to the perceived risk of imminent eruption.
