= Pozzuoli =

City and comune of the Metropolitan City of Naples, in the Italian region of Campania

Pozzuoli Pozzule (Neapolitan)
- Comune
- Comune di Pozzuoli
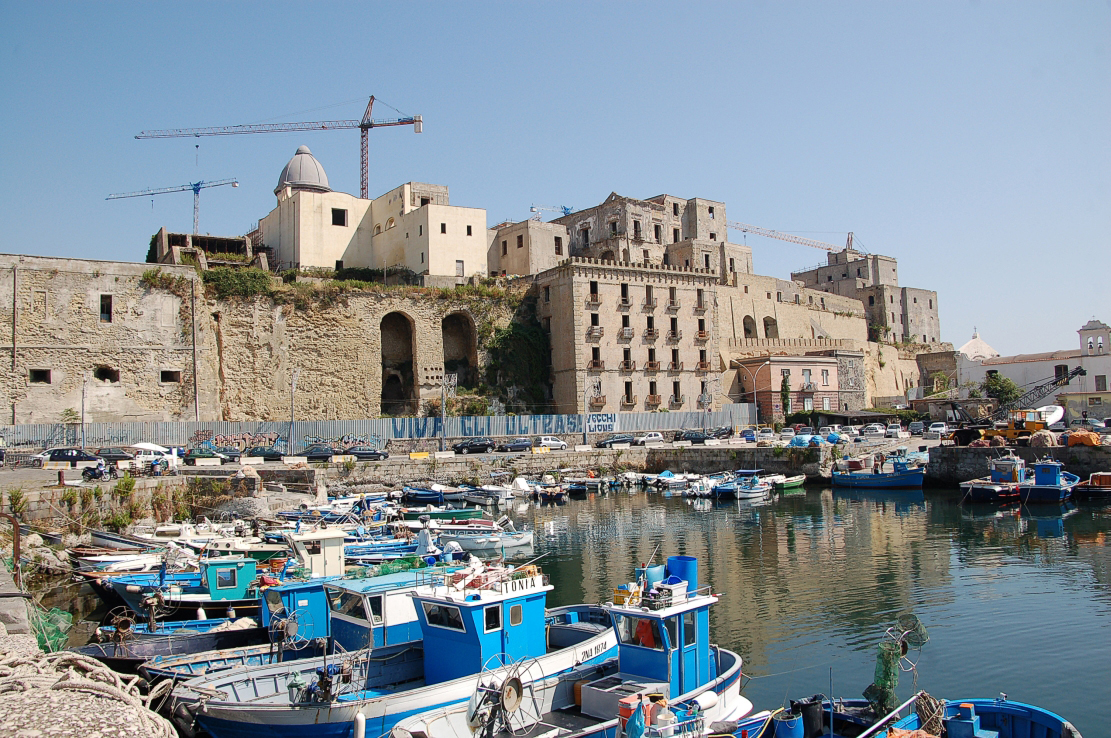
- Rione Terra, the first settlement

- Flag Coat of arms

- Location within Campania Location within Italy
- Coordinates: 40°50′40″N 14°05′36″E
- Country: Italy
- Region: Campania
- Metropolitan city: Naples (NA)
- Frazioni: Arco Felice, Campana Annunziata, Cuma, Licola Centro, Licola Lido, Lucrino, Montenuovo, Monterusciello, Pisciarelli, Toiano

Government
  - Mayor: Luigi Manzoni (PD)

Area
  - Total: 43.44 km^{2} (16.77 sq mi)
- Elevation: 28 m (92 ft)

Population (2026)
  - Total: 74,665
  - Density: 1,719/km^{2} (4,452/sq mi)
- Demonym: Puteolani
- Time zone: UTC+1 (CET)
  - Summer (DST): UTC+2 (CEST)
- Postal code: 80078, 80014, 80125
- Dialing code: 081
- Patron saint: St. Proculus
- Saint day: 16 November
- Website: Official website

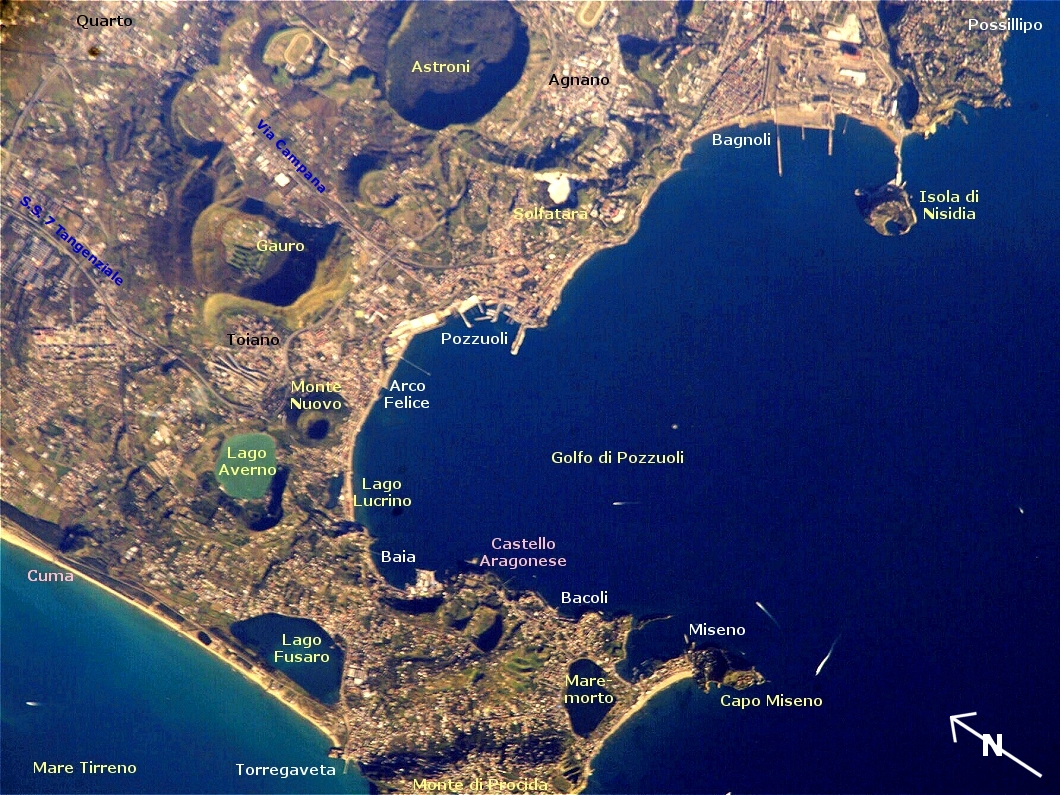
Pozzuoli and surroundings

Pozzuoli (Italian: [potˈtswɔːli]; Neapolitan: Pozzule [pətˈtsuːlə]; Latin: Puteoli) is a city and comune (municipality) in the Metropolitan City of Naples in the region of Campania in southern Italy. The main city of the Phlegrean Peninsula, it has 74,665 inhabitants.

Pozzuoli, known in antiquity as Puteoli, was established in 531 BC as the Greek colony of Dicaearchia by refugees fleeing the tyranny of Polycrates on Samos. During the Second Punic War (218–201 BC), the city's fortified harbor withstood the advances of the Carthaginian general Hannibal. Following the Romanization of Campania, Rome established a colony at Puteoli in 194 BC. The region was important for its pozzolana, a volcanic sand essential to the production of Roman concrete.

At its peak during the late Republic and early Empire, Puteoli was the primary commercial port of Rome, despite being located 150 mi (241.40 km) from the capital. The city played a role in the import of wheat from Egypt to Rome and became home to a mixed population that included Greeks, Jews, Nabataeans, Phoenician merchants, and early Christians. The city began to decline in the mid-1st century AD as the emperors Claudius and Trajan expanded the port of Ostia in Latium to provide a direct gateway to the Tiber. In the late 5th century AD, fall of the Western Roman Empire further weakened the city, which was then sacked by the Visigoths, Vandals, and Ostrogoths.

== History ==
=== Antiquity ===
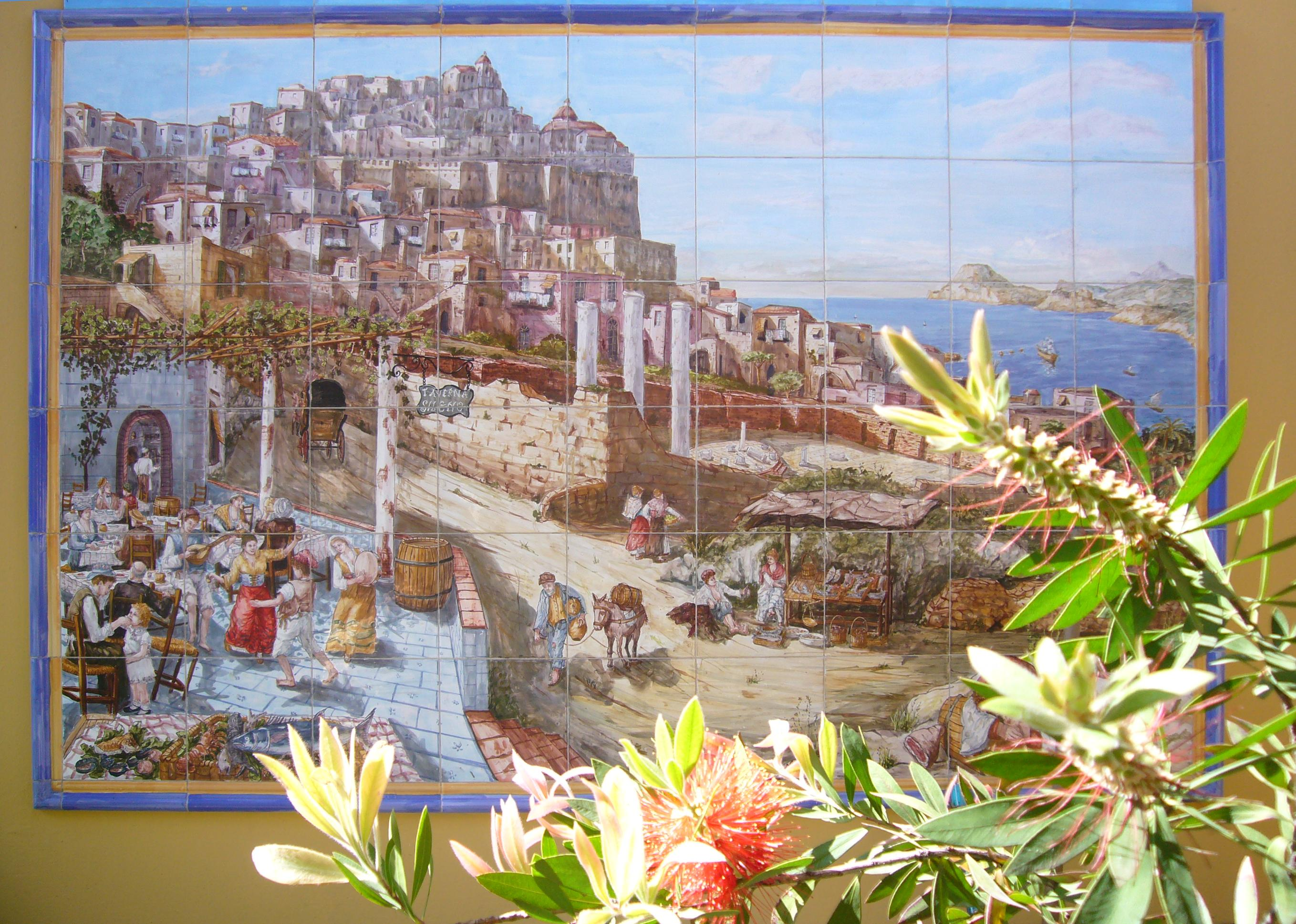
Pozzuoli in 1800, majolica in Pozzuoli

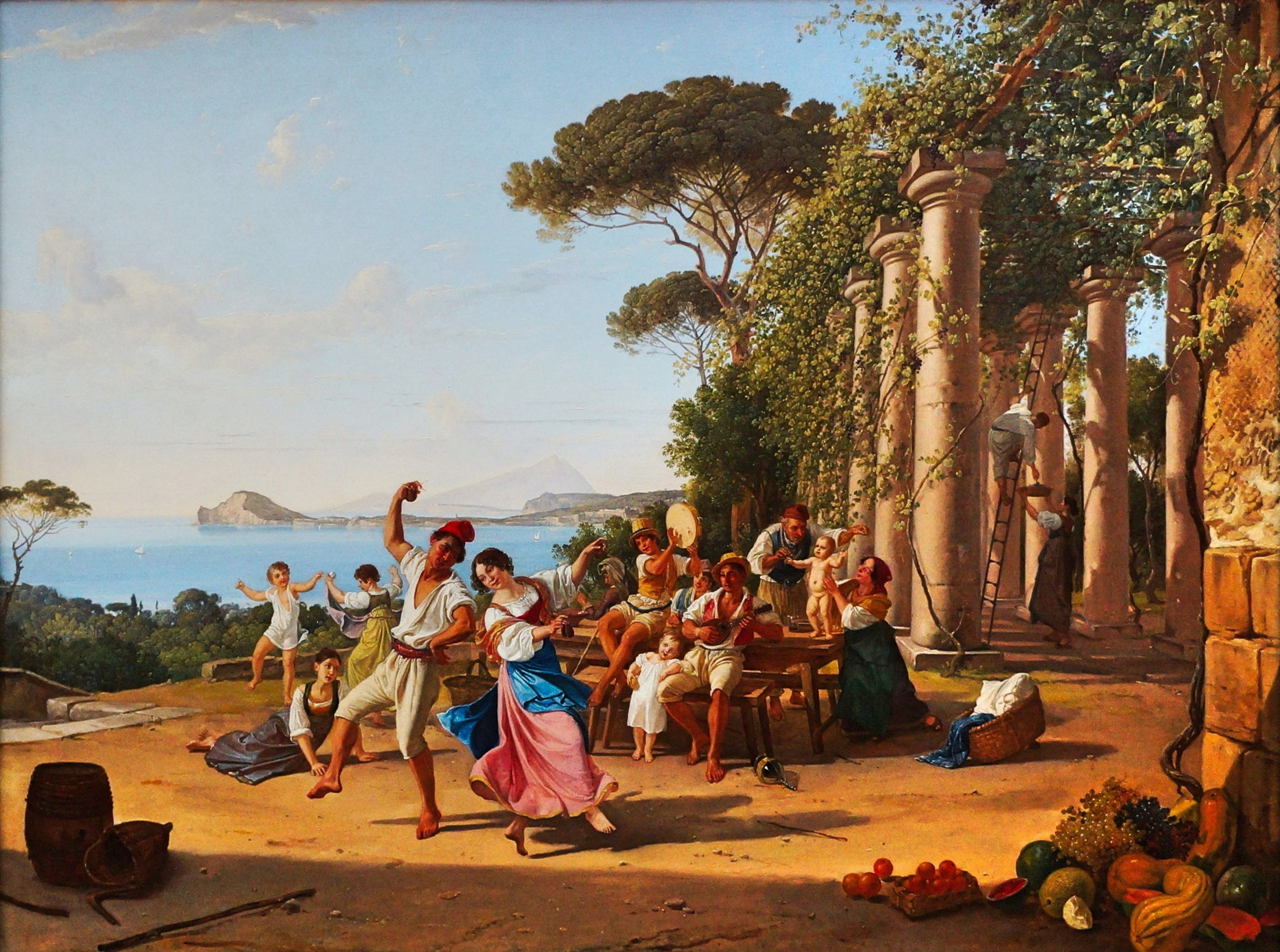
Festival near Pozzuoli, by Franz Ludwig Catel, 1823

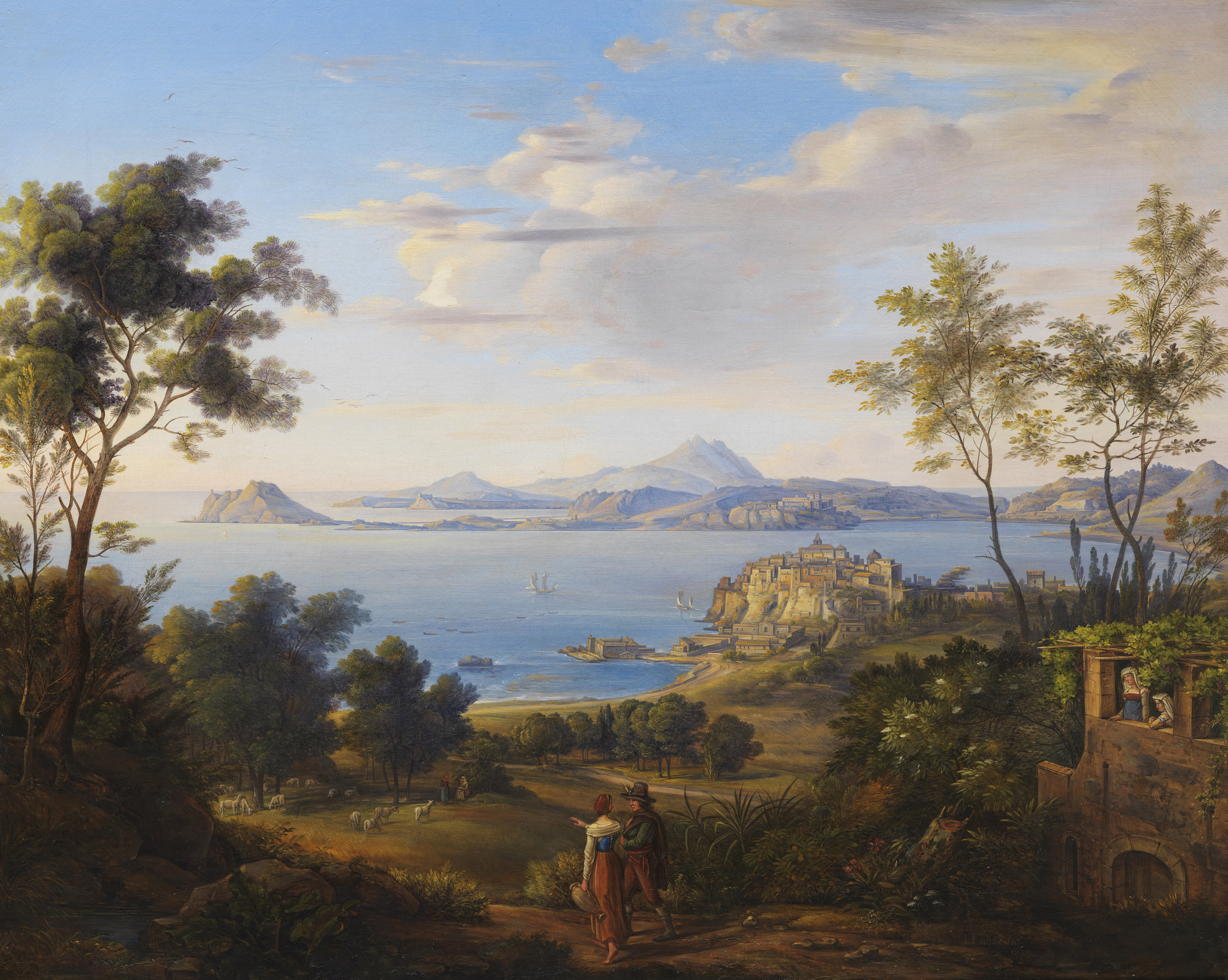
View of Pozzuoli in 1829, by Johann Joachim Faber

Pozzuoli began as the Greek colony of Dicaearchia (Greek: Δικαιαρχία) founded in about 531 BC in Magna Graecia with the consent of nearby Cumae when refugees from Samos escaped from the tyranny of Polycrates.

The Samnites occupied Dicaearchia in 421 BC after conquering Cumae and may have changed its name to Fistelia. It enjoyed considerable political and commercial autonomy favoured by the excellent position of its port with the Campanian hinterland. The Roman occupation of Campania after the end of the 1st Samnite War from 341 BC marked the start of the Romanisation of the Greek-Samnite city.

During the Second Punic War (218–201 BC), Rome recognised the strategic importance of the port of Puteoli and reinforced the defences and introduced a garrison to protect the town from Hannibal, who failed to capture it in 215. They made it a Roman colony from 195 BC. The Roman conquest of the east and the need for a port to trade made it the Mediterranean port of Rome, even though it was 150 mi (241.40 km) away. It took the name Puteoli whose roots are in the Latin puteus (well or cistern). An alternative etymology of Puteoli derives from the Latin puteo (to stink), referring to the sulfuric fumes in the area, most notably from Solfatara.

Puteoli became the great emporium for the Alexandrian grain ships and other ships from all over the Roman world. It also was the main hub for goods exported from Campania, including blown glass, mosaics, wrought iron, and marble. Lucilius wrote in about 125 BC that it was second only to Delos in importance, then the greatest harbour of the ancient world. Many inscriptions show that a polyglot population established companies (stationes) for trade and transport and formed professional guilds for arts, crafts and religious associations for foreign cults; they included Greeks from the islands and the coast of Asia, Jews and later Christians. Under the Roman Empire, it was the greatest emporium of foreign trade in all of Italy.

The Roman naval base at nearby Misenum housed the largest naval fleet in the ancient world. It was also the site of the Roman Dictator Sulla's country villa and the place where he died in 78 BC. Cicero had a house in Puteoli and a villa nearby on the shore of the Lucrine Lake. Pliny mentions Puteoli as the site of a famed cochlearium created by Fulvius Hirpinus, known for raising exquisite snails.

The local volcanic sand, pozzolana (Latin: pulvis puteolanus, "dust of Puteoli") was the basis for Roman concrete, which reacted chemically with water, turning the sand/lime mix into a mortar strong enough to bind lumps of aggregate into a load-bearing unit. This made it possible to construct the cupola of the Pantheon, which is still the world's largest unreinforced concrete dome.

The apostle Paul landed in Pozzuoli on his way to Rome, 150 mi (241.40 km) away, stayed for seven days (Acts 28:13, 14), and then began with his companions his journey by the Appian Way to Rome. The Puteoli Nabataean inscriptions confirm the existence of a Nabataean community in the city that built a sanctuary at the port; it likely ended in the early second century AD when the site was filled with concrete. An inscription dating from 174 AD (C.I. no. 5853) also attests to a trading station of Tyrians. It records a petition by merchants who requested that their home city of Tyre (in modern Lebanon) help maintain their commercial statio (designated office or headquarters) as declining membership and rising religious expenses had made the institution difficult to sustain.

In 37 AD, Puteoli was the location for a political stunt by Emperor Gaius Caligula, who, on becoming Emperor, ordered a temporary floating bridge to be built using trading vessels, stretching for over two miles (3.2 km) from the town to the famous neighboring resort of Baiae, across which he proceeded to ride his horse, in defiance of an astrologer's prediction that he had "no more chance of becoming Emperor than of riding a horse across the Gulf of Baiae".

With the development of the port of Ostia begun by Claudius in 42 AD, completed by Nero in 54 and enlarged by Trajan between 100 and 106, the fortunes of Puteoli began to decline, although Antoninus Pius repaired the pier's storm damage in 139. Nero's abortive attempt to build the Fossa Neronis canal from Puteoli to Rome may have prolonged its life. As a reward for their support in the fight against Vitellius, Vespasian (r. 69–79 AD) installed more veterans there, assigned the city a part of the Capuan territory and gave it the title Colonia Flavia which it retained.

Hadrian died at Baiae in 138 and was at Cicero's villa at Puteoli, though his body was later transferred to Rome.

Two aqueducts eventually served Puteoli; the Campanian aqueduct dating from the 1st c. BC at the latest, and also the Aqua Augusta. Several cisterns still exist, including the very large Piscina di Cardito.

Saint Proculus (San Procolo) was martyred here with his companions in the fourth century, and is the city's patron saint. The seven eagle heads on the coat of arms of the town of Pozzuoli are said to represent seven of these martyrs. November 16 was the official feast day for Saint Proculus. St Proculus was affectionately nicknamed 'u pisciasotto ("the pants-pisser") because November 16 was often a day of rain. The townspeople also celebrated his feast day on the second Sunday in May.

=== Late antiquity ===
The city was taken and plundered by Alaric I in 410, by Genseric in 455, and by Totila in 545, from which it took centuries to recover.

=== Modern era ===
Charles Lyell visited Pozzuoli in 1828 and studied the Macellum columns.

Since 1946, the town has been the home of the Accademia Aeronautica, the Italian Air Force Academy, which was first situated on the island of Nisida, then from 1962 on a purpose-built hilltop campus overlooking the bay.

From August 1982 to December 1984, the city experienced hundreds of tremors and bradyseismic activity, which peaked on 4 October 1983, damaging 8,000 buildings in the city centre and displacing 36,000 people, many permanently. The events raised the sea bottom by almost 2 m, and rendered the Bay of Pozzuoli too shallow for large craft. There was similar seismic activity in 2023 and late 2026.

== Demographics ==
Historical population
Year	Pop.	±%
1861	11,190	—
1871	11,464	+2.4%
1881	12,322	+7.5%
1901	17,017	+38.1%
1911	20,388	+19.8%
1921	23,079	+13.2%
1931	27,042	+17.2%
1936	29,690	+9.8%
1951	41,457	+39.6%
1961	51,308	+23.8%
1971	59,813	+16.6%
1981	69,861	+16.8%
1991	75,142	+7.6%
2001	78,754	+4.8%
2011	80,357	+2.0%
2021	76,952	−4.2%
Source: ISTAT

As of 2026, the population is 74,665, of which 48.6% are male, and 51.4% are female. Minors make up 15.1% of the population, and seniors make up 23.1%.

=== Immigration ===
As of 2025, immigrants make up 3.8% of the population. The 5 largest foreign countries of birth are Ukraine, Iran, Romania, Brazil, and the United States.

== Main sights ==
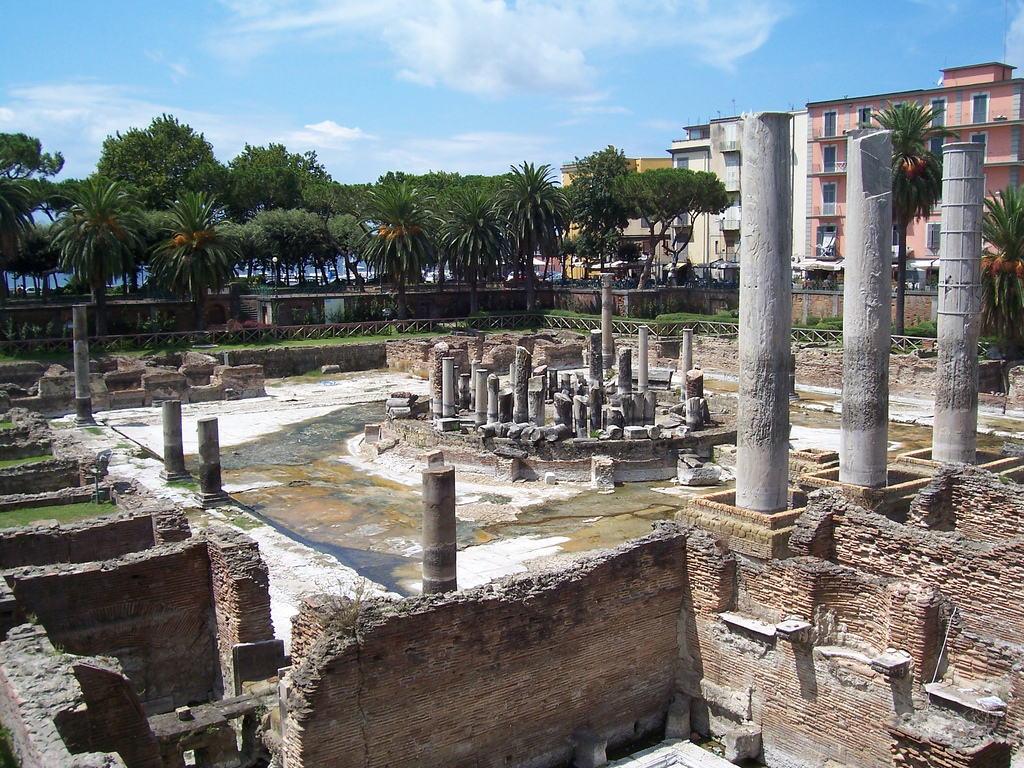
The ancient Macellum of Pozzuoli was a market building, erroneously identified as a Serapeum when a statue of Serapis was discovered

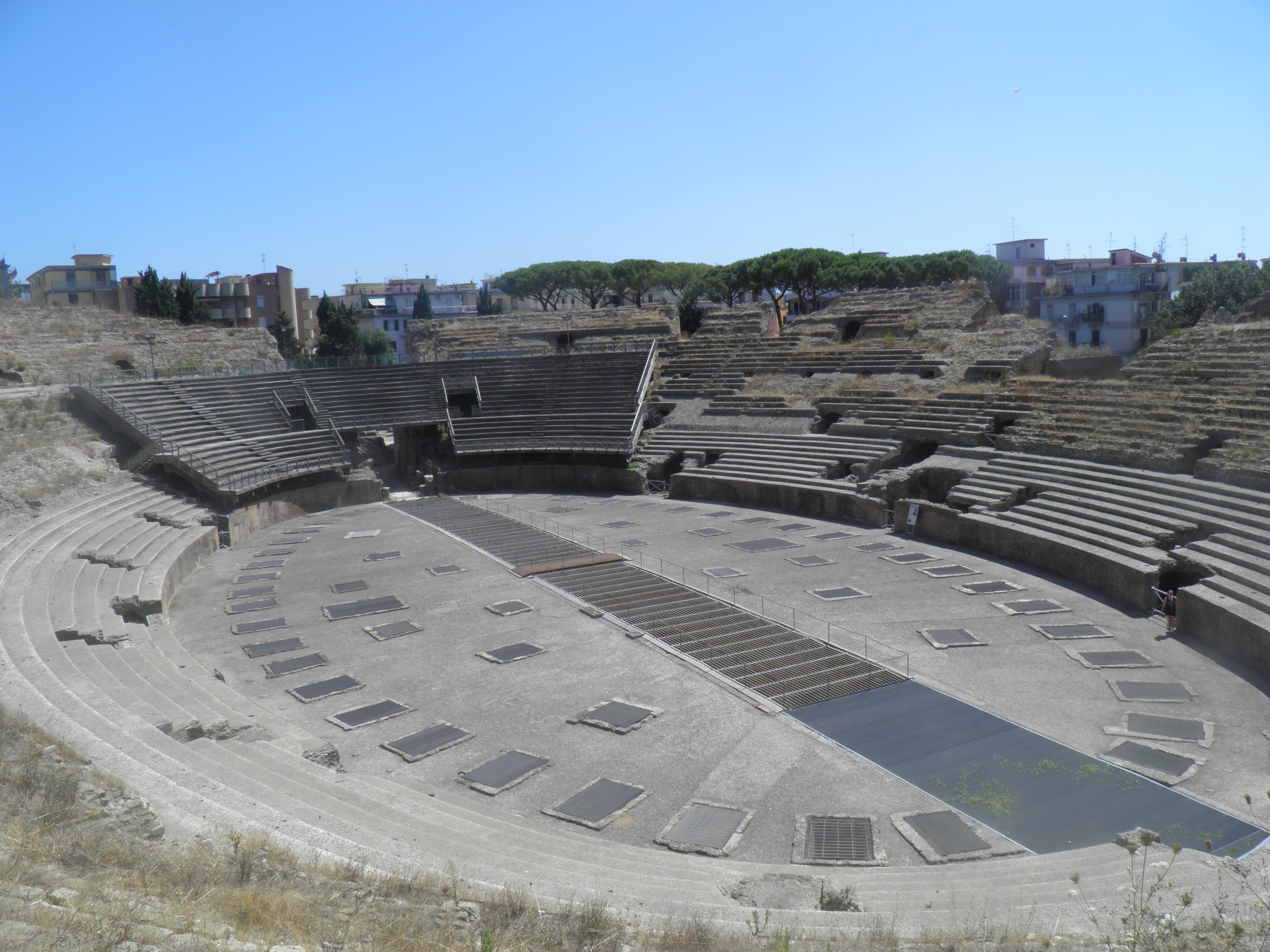
Flavian Amphitheatre

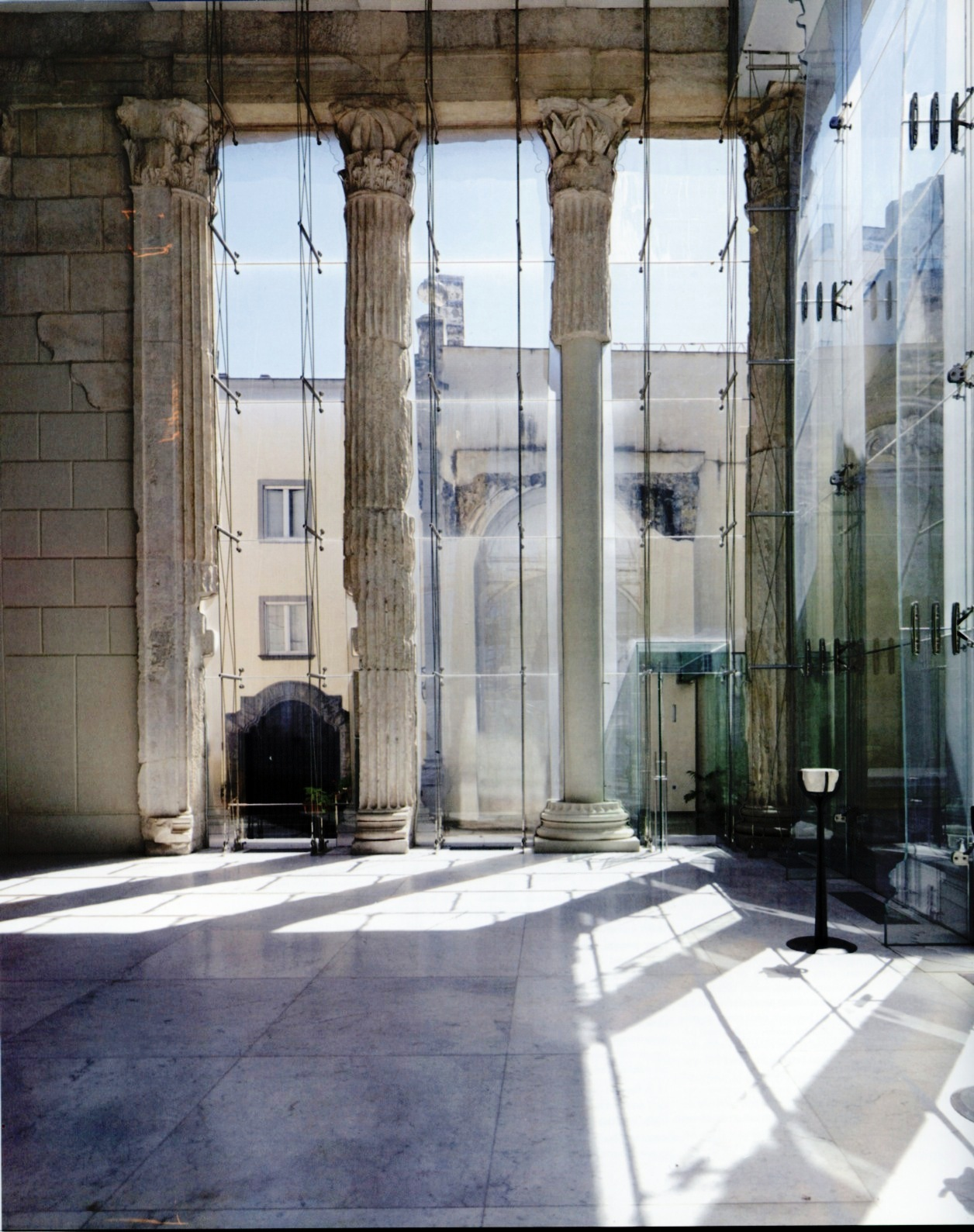
Temple of Augustus in the Cathedral

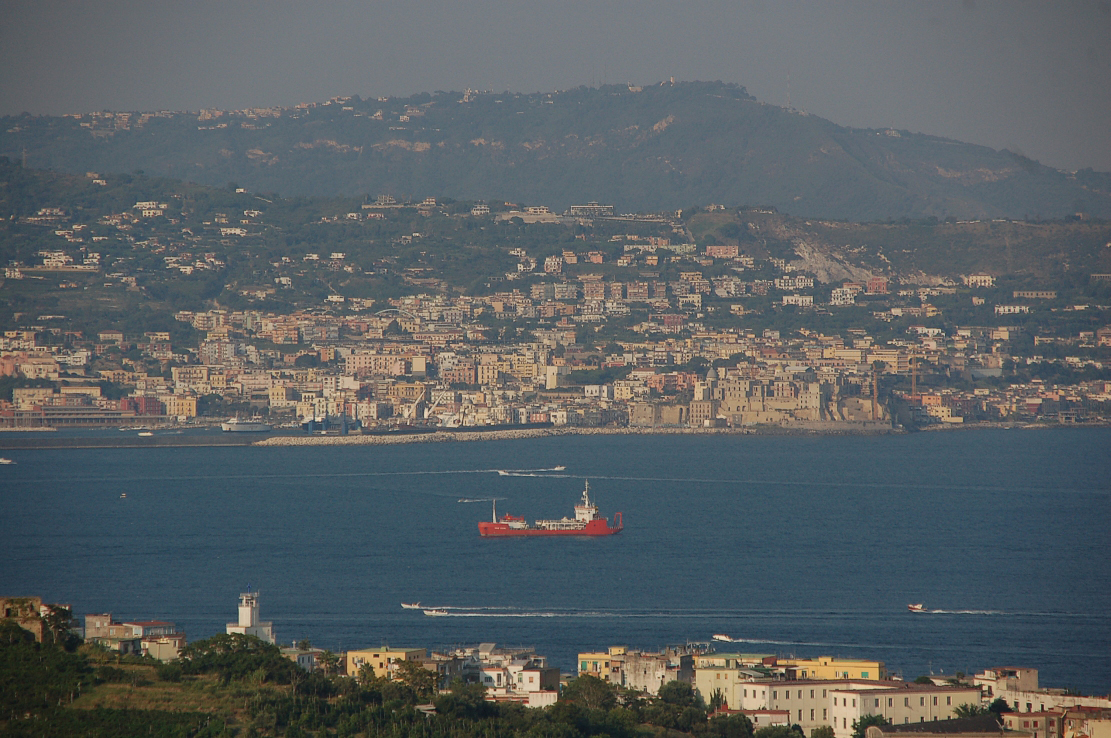
View of Pozzuoli

The town's attractions include:

- Flavian Amphitheatre (Amphitheatrum Flavium), the third largest Italian amphitheatre after the Colosseum and the Capuan Amphitheatre.
- The Macellum of Pozzuoli, also known as the Temple of Serapis or serapeum, is considered the city's symbol. The "temple" was a marketplace. Its name derives from the misinterpretation of its function after a statue of the god Serapis was found in 1750. The Macellum includes three majestic columns in Cipollino marble, which show erosion from marine Lithophaga molluscs when, at an earlier time, the ground level was much lower due to Bradyseism, and sea-water could flow in.
- Temple of Augustus (part of the cathedral)
- Smaller Amphitheatre, very close to the Flavian one, its remains were absorbed by other buildings, but some arches can be seen by Via Solfatara and Via Vign
- Roman Baths, the so-called Temple of Neptune, are the remains of a big thermal complex now in Corso Terracciano, which also included the nearby "Dianae Nymphaeum".
- The Villa Avellino park has several Roman ruins and cisterns. There is also a still working Roman "face" water fountain.
- Rione Terra, the first settlement of Puteoli, originally Dikaiarkhia in Greek.
- Necropolis of Via Celle, a rich complex of tombs and mausoleums, very near to an old Roman road still used today (Via Cupa Cigliano).
- Necropolis of the Via Puteolis Capuam, just under the bridge that leads outside the city near Via Solfatara.
- Stadium of Antoninus Pius, a very similar stadium to the Domitian one in Rome, partially excavated (Via Campi Flegrei).
- The Piscina di Cardito cistern, second in size only to the Piscina Mirabilis, and used as a settlement tank for the water supply from the Aqua Augusta aqueduct.
- Sanctuary of San Gennaro (St. Januarius). Along with the Cathedral of Naples, it is one of the two places where the alleged miracle of the liquefaction of the saint's blood occurs.
- Solfatara (volcanic crater with active fumaroles)
- A now submerged Nabataean temple in Puteoli (modern Pozzuoli)

== Transport ==
It is easily reached by train from Rome on Naples Metro line 2, and by the trains of "Cumana" lines leaving from the station of Montesanto, in the city center.

== Notable people ==
- Januarius (232–305), Patron Saint of Naples, executed at Solfatara c. 305.
- Josephus landed there on his way to Rome (The Life of Flavius Josephus; 3.16).
- William Jopling (1911–1997), British leprologist, was born there.
- Sophia Loren (born 1934), film actress, grew up there.
- Gilbert, Count of Montpensier (1443–1496), Viceroy of Naples, died there on 15 October 1496.
- Saint Paul, the Apostle (c. 5–c. 64/65), landed there on his way to Rome (Acts 28:13).
- Giovanni Battista Pergolesi, Baroque composer, died there.
- Lucius Cornelius Sulla (138–78 BC), Dictator of Rome, died at his villa there.
- Ludovica Nasti (born 2006), Italian actress

== See also ==
- De balneis Puteolanis
- Pozzolan, pozzolana, pozzolanic activity: terms relating to lithic material named after Pozzuoli, which is used to create cement

== Bibliography ==
- Amalfitano, Paolo, et al. (1990) I Campi Flegrei, Venezia
- Annecchino, Raimondo (1960) Storia di Pozzuoli e della zona flegrea. Pozzuoli: Arti Grafiche D. Conte
- Gianfrotta, Piero Alfredo & Maniscalco, Fabio (eds.) (1998) Forma Maris: Forum Internazionale di Archeologia Subacquea. Puteoli
- Gore, Rick (May 1984). "A Prayer For Pozzuoli". National Geographic. Vol. 165, no. 5. pp. 614–625. ISSN 0027-9358. OCLC 643483454.
- Puteoli: studi di storia Romana; no. 2; 4/5
  - Sommella, Paolo (1978) Forma e urbanistica di Pozzuoli romana. Pozzuoli: Azienda Autonoma di Soggiorno, Cura e Turismo di Pozzuoli
  - Atti del convegno Studi e ricerche su Puteoli romana: Napoli, Centre J. Bérard, 2-3 aprile 1979. Napoli, 1984
