= John Izard Middleton =

- Born: August 13, 1785; Saint Andrews, South Carolina, US
- Died: October 5, 1849 (aged 64); Paris, France
- Education: Cambridge University
- Spouse: Eliza Augusta Falconet (after 1810)
- Children: 3
- Parent(s): Mary Izard Middleton; Arthur Middleton
- Relatives: Henry Middleton (brother); Henry Middleton (grandfather)

John Izard Middleton (August 13, 1785 – October 5, 1849) was an American archeologist and artist who was dubbed "the first American Classical Archaeologist" by Charles Eliot Norton.

== Early life ==
Middleton was born in Saint Andrews, just outside Charleston, South Carolina on August 13, 1785. He was the son of Mary Izard and Continental Congressman Arthur Middleton who signed the Declaration of Independence. They lived at Middleton Place, which his elder brother Henry (later Governor of South Carolina, U.S. Representative and Minister to Russia) inherited. His paternal grandparents were Henry Middleton and Mary Baker Williams, both of English descent.

== Career ==
Admitted to Cambridge University in 1803, though it is doubtful if he resided, John Middleton spent a good part of his adult life traveling in France and in Italy. While in Italy he was attracted to the remains of ancient sites, particularly those in Latium (modern Lazio). Inspired perhaps by the work of the Frenchman Louis-Charles-Francois Petit-Radel (author of Voyage historique cronographique et philosophique dans le principales villes des l’Italie (Paris, 1815); Recherches sur le Monuments Cyclopéens (Paris, 1841)), Middleton made observations and sketches of the sites he visited. Middleton executed the drawings while traveling in Italy during 1808 and 1809 and considered his work an artistic achievement. He attributed more importance to the drawings than the text, but because it appeared during a time of turmoil in Europe, his work received slight attention from contemporaries. Some of the drawings appeared in later works on archaeology without credit to Middleton, notably those of Edward Dodwell with whom Middleton travelled. He compiled the sketches from his travels in 1808 and 1809 in order to publish as a folio-sized book, Grecian remains in Italy: a description of Cyclopian walls, and of Roman antiquities.

== Personal life ==
Coat of Arms of John Izard Middleton

In 1810, he married Eliza Augusta Falconet, a daughter of Jean Louis de Palézieux-Falconnet, a Swiss banker in Naples, and the former Anna Hunter, an American from Newport, Rhode Island who was the sister of U.S. Senator William Hunter. Eliza's sister, Anne Henriette, was the wife of James-Alexandre de Pourtalès. Three children were born to the Middletons, but all died young.

Middleton died in Paris in 1849. His remains were returned to the United States for burial at Middleton Place, South Carolina.

== Publications ==
- Grecian remains in Italy: a description of Cyclopian walls, and of Roman antiquities. With topographical and picturesque views of ancient Latium. London: Printed for Edward Orme by W. Bulmer and Co., 1812.
- Views and Description of Cyclopean or Pelasgic remains in Greece and Italy , London, 1934.
