= Andrea De Jorio =

Andrea De Jorio (1769–1851) was an Italian antiquarian who is remembered today among ethnographers as the first ethnographer of body language, in his work La mimica degli antichi investigata nel gestire napoletano, 1832 ("The mime of the Ancients investigated through Neapolitan gesture"). The work has been mined, refined and criticized.

Born on the island of Procida in the Gulf of Naples, De Jorio became a Canon at the Cathedral of Naples, a respected archaeologist under the pre-modern conditions of his times, and a curator at the predecessor to the Museo Archeologico Nazionale, Naples.

He wrote very extensively about the then-recent excavations of classical antiquity near Naples, such as Pompeii, Herculaneum, and Cumae.

His recognition in the frescos of Pompeii and Herculaneum provided him with his insight, that the gestures depicted were familiar to him in the streets of modern Naples. The book stressed the continuity from Classical times to the present by showing the similarity between hand gestures depicted on ancient Greek vases found near Naples and the gestures of modern Neapolitans. "Its a doubtful premise of a time-honored continuity" in culture has retreated to the confines of sentimental writings on Neapolitan cuisine, but De Jorio was among the first ethnographers to venture into the field, producing the first scholarly investigation of Neapolitan hand gestures; it remains the source literature for more recent treatments of the topic, both scholarly and popular.

The volume has been reprinted three times photostatically in Italian in recent years—1964, 1979, and 2002—and recently (2000) in a scholarly and annotated English translation by Adam Kendon as Andrea de Jorio: Gesture in Naples and Gesture in Classical Antiquity (Indiana University Press, 2000).
