= List of countries by annual cannabis use =

A world map of annual cannabis prevalence, 2011

This is a list of the annual prevalence of cannabis use by country, including some territories, as a percentage of the population.

== Methodology ==
The indicator is an "annual prevalence" rate, which is the percentage of the youth and adult population who have consumed cannabis at least once in the past survey year. As with all surveys of behavior, the legal and social status of the behavior in question may bias individuals' responses to varying extents, making results comparatively more reliable in jurisdictions with lower legal and social risks surrounding the use of cannabis.

== Nations ==
Asterisk (*) links below are "Cannabis in LOCATION" links.

Location	Annual prevalence (%)	Year	Age group	Sources, notes
Afghanistan *	3.81	2015	15+	
Albania *	5.60	2014	15–64	
Algeria *	0.52	2010	12+	
American Samoa *	7.0	2007		
Andorra *	14.6	2008		
Angola *	2.1	1999		
Antigua and Barbuda *	10.6	2005		
Argentina *	8.13	2017	15–64	
Armenia *	3.5	2003		
Australia *	11.6	2019		
Austria *	6.30	2020	15–64	
Azerbaijan *	3.5	2004		
Bahamas *	3.10	2017	12–65	
Bahrain *	0.4			(tentative)
Bangladesh *	3.3	2004	15–54	
Barbados *	8.3	2006	12–65	
Belarus *	1.1	2007		
Belgium *	7.00	2020	15–64	
Belize *	12.7	2019	15+	
Bhutan *	4.20	2009	15–64	
Bolivia *	2.19	2018	15–64	
Bosnia and Herzegovina *	1.60	2011	15–64	
Brazil *	2.81	2012	15–64	
Brunei *	0.02	1996		
Bulgaria *	2.40	2020	15–64	
Burkina Faso *	2.9	2006		
Cambodia *	3.5	2003		
Canada *	27	2022	16+	
Cape Verde *	2.40	2012	15–64	
Chad *	0.9	1995		
Chile *	12.05	2020	15–64	
China *	0.04	2015		(tentative)
Colombia *	2.68	2019	12–65	
Comoros *	2.9	2002		
Costa Rica *	5.18	2015	15–64	
Ivory Coast *	3.24	2017	15–64	
Croatia *	10.20	2020	15–64	
Cyprus *	4.00	2020	15–64	
Czech Republic *	11.10	2020	15–64	
Denmark *	6.30	2020	15–64	
Dominica *	10.8	2006		
Dominican Republic *	0.68	2010	12–65	
Ecuador *	0.67	2013	12–65	
Egypt *	5.31	2016	15–64	
El Salvador *	2.03	2014	12–65	
Estonia *	6.60	2020	15–64	
Ethiopia *	2.6	1999		
Faroe Islands (Denmark)	2.2	2007		
Fiji *	5.1	2004		
Finland *	8.20	2020	15–64	
France *	11.00	2020	15–64	
Georgia *	3.40	2015	18–64	
Germany *	7.10	2020	15–64	
Ghana *	21.5	1998		
Gibraltar *	5.2	2008		
Greece *	2.80	2020	15–64	
Greenland * (Denmark)	12.3	2019	15+	
Grenada *	10.8	2005		
Guam *	18.4	2007		
Guatemala *	3.48	2014	15–64	
Guyana *	4.60	2016	12–65	
Haiti *	2.50	2018	15–64	
Honduras *	0.8	2005		
Hong Kong *	0.4	2008		
Hungary *	1.30	2020	15–64	
Iceland *	5.80	2017	18–64	
India *	3.2	2020		
Indonesia *	1.44	2019	15–64	
Iran *	0.58	2015	15–64	
Ireland *	7.10	2020	15–64	
Isle of Man	9.4	2007		
Israel *	14.00	2020	18–86	
Italy *	10.20	2020	15–64	
Jamaica *	18.00	2016	11	
Japan *	0.1	2019	15–64	
Jordan *	2.1	2001		
Kazakhstan *	2.40	2012	15–64	
Kenya *	1.20	2016	15–64	
Kosovo *	1.30	2019	15–64	
Kuwait *	3.1	2005		
Kyrgyzstan *	6.4	2001		
Laos *	0.9	2008		
Latvia *	3.90	2020	15–64	
Lebanon *	1.9	2009		
Liberia *	7.52	2017	15–64	
Libya	0.05	1998		
Liechtenstein *	8.6	2005		
Lithuania *	2.70	2020	15–64	
Luxembourg *	5.40	2020	15–64	
Macau *	0.7	2003		
Madagascar *	14.2	2019	15+	
Malaysia *	1.6	2003		
Maldives *	2.55	2012	15–64	
Mali *	7.8	1995		
Malta *	0.90	2020	15–64	
Marshall Islands	5.5	2007		
Mauritius *	1.08	2009	15–54	
Mexico *	2.10	2016	12–65	
Moldova *	0.70	2010	15–64	
Monaco *	10.47	2017	18–64	
Montenegro *	4.60	2017	15–64	
Morocco *	10.47	2017	15–64	
Myanmar *	0.9	2005		
Namibia *	3.9	2000		
Nepal *	0.71	2019	15–50	
Netherlands *	10.10	2020	15–64	
New Caledonia *	1.9			(tentative)
New Zealand *	15.00	2020	18+	
Nicaragua	1.1	2006	12–65	
Nigeria *	19.4	2019	15+	
Northern Mariana Islands *	22.2	2007		
North Macedonia *	6.60	2017	15–64	
Norway *	7.0	2024	16–64	
Oman *	0.1	1999		
Pakistan *	3.60	2012	15–64	
Palau *	24.2	2007		
Panama *	0.77	2015	12–65	
Papua New Guinea *	29.5	1995	15– 64	
Paraguay *	1.6	2005		
Peru *	1.62	2017	15–64	
Philippines *	1.64	2016	10–69	
Poland *	3.80	2020	15–64	
Portugal *	5.10	2020	15–64	
Puerto Rico *	4.9	2005		
Qatar *	0.1	1996		
Romania *	3.50	2020	15–64	
Russia *	3.5	2007		
Saint Kitts and Nevis *	11.7	2006		
Saint Lucia *	8.87	2010	15–64	
Saint Vincent and the Grenadines *	7.1	2006		
Saudi Arabia *	0.3	2006		
Senegal *	2.8	1999		
Serbia *	2.00	2018	15–64	
Sierra Leone *	6.48	2017	15–64	
Singapore *	0.004	2004		
Slovakia *	3.80	2020	15–64	
Slovenia *	5.90	2020	15–64	
Somalia *	2.5	2002		
South Africa *	3.65	2011	9–64	
South Korea *	0.3	2004		
Spain *	10.50	2020	15–64	
Sri Lanka *	1.90	2018	14+	
Suriname *	3.40	2013	12–65	
Sweden *	3.80	2020	15–64	
Switzerland *	9.09	2016	15–64	
Syria *	2.0	2002		(tentative)
Taiwan *	0.3	2005	12–64	
Tajikistan *	3.4	1998		
Tanzania *	0.2	1999		(tentative)
Thailand *	1.33	2019	12–65	
Togo *	1.0	2009		
Trinidad and Tobago *	4.79	2017	15–64	
Tunisia *	5.35	2017	15–64	
Turkey *	1.10	2020	15–64	
Turks and Caicos Islands *	5.4	2002		
Uganda *	1.4			(tentative)
Ukraine *	2.13	2015	15–64	
United Arab Emirates *	5.4	2006		
United Kingdom *	7.10	2020	15–64	
United States *	21.90	2020	18+	
Uruguay *	14.60	2018	15–65	
Uzbekistan *	4.2	2003		
Vanuatu *	0.1	1997		
Venezuela *	1.56	2011	12–65	
Vietnam *	0.3	2002		
Zambia *	14.8	2019	15+	
Zimbabwe *	6.9	2000		

== See also ==
- Adult lifetime cannabis use by country
- Health issues and the effects of cannabis
- Legal and medical status of cannabis
- Legality of cannabis by country

Other substances:

- List of countries by prevalence of opiates use
- List of countries by prevalence of cocaine use
