= Adult lifetime cannabis use by country =

Adult lifetime cannabis use by country is the lifetime prevalence of cannabis use among all adults in surveys among the general population. Lifetime prevalence means any use of cannabis during a person's life.

== Table ==
- Age range is the range the data computation is based on.
- Asterisks (*) are for locations with "Cannabis in LOCATION" links.

Percent of age range who have used cannabis by country
Location	Geographical area	Year	Age range	Males	Females	Total	Ref.
Australia *	National	2022-2023	14+			41	
Austria *	National	2020	15–64	24.8	20.6	22.7	
Belgium *	National	2018	15–64	28.1	17.3	22.6	
Brazil *	National	2017	16+	27.0	12.0	19.5	
Bulgaria *	National	2020	15–64	9.5	7.8	8.7	
Canada *	National	2024	16+	28	23	26	
Chile *	National	2014	12–64			31.5	
China *	Beijing and Shanghai metropolitan areas.	2002–3	18+			0.3	
Colombia *	All urban areas of the country (approximately 73% of the total national population).	2003	18–65			10.8	
Croatia *	National	2019	15–64	28.8	16.9	22.9	
Cyprus *	National	2019	15–64	21.5	7.1	14.1	
Czech Republic *	National	2021	15–64	31.1	21.1	25.9	
Denmark *	National	2021	15–64	44	32	37.9	
Estonia *	National	2018	15–64	30.8	20.3	24.5	
Finland *	National	2018	15–64	29.8	21.3	25.6	
France *	National	2021	15–64	54.9	39.9	47.3	
Germany *	National	2021	15–64	38.9	30.2	34.7	
Greece *	National	2015	15–64	15.8	6.3	11	
Hungary *	National	2019	15–64	8.4	4	6.1	
Ireland *	National	2019	15–64	29.5	19.3	24.4	
Israel *	National	2002–4	21+			11.5	
Italy *	National	2017	15–64	39.1	26.4	32.7	
Japan *	Four metropolitan areas (Fukiage, Kushikino, Nagasaki, Okayama).	2002–3	20+			1.5	
Latvia *	National	2020	15–64	22	8.2	15	
Lebanon *	National	2002–3	18+			4.6	
Lithuania *	National	2021	15–64	20.7	6.8	13.7	
Luxembourg *	National	2019	15–64	27.8	19.6	23.3	
Malta *	National	2013	15–64	6.7	2	4.3	
Mexico *	All urban areas of the country (approximately 75% of the total national population).	2001–2	18–65			7.8	
Nepal *	All urban areas of the country (approximately 80% of the total national population).	2001–2	18–65			7.8	
Netherlands *	National	2021	15–64	35.7	23.9	29.8	
New Zealand *	National	2004–5	16+			41.9	
Nigeria *	21 of the 36 states in the country, representing 57% of the national population.	2002–3	18+			2.7	
Norway *	National	2024	16–64	35.0	24.0	30.0	
Peru *	Seven cities (Lima, Trujillo, Tacna, Arequipa, Ayacucho, Tarapoto and Iquitos)	2003	12–64			10.3	
Poland *	National	2018	15–64	16.4	7.7	12.1	
Portugal *	National	2016	15–64	15.6	6.6	11	
Romania *	National	2019	15–64	8	4.3	6.1	
Slovakia *	National	2019	15–64	23.4	10.6	17	
Slovenia *	National	2018	15–64	24.7	16.5	20.7	
South Africa *	National	2003–4	18+			8.4	
Spain *	National	2022	15–64	48.8	32.9	40.9	
Sweden *	National	2021	15–64	21.9	13.1	17.6	
Turkey *	National	2017	15–64	5.4	0.2	2.7	
Ukraine *	National	2002	18+			6.4	
England and Wales * (UK)	National	2021-22	16–59			31.2	
Northern Ireland * (UK)	National	2010–11	15–64			24.0	
Scotland * (UK)	National	2010–11	16–64			26.7	
United Kingdom *	United Kingdom overall	2006	16–59			30.2	
United States *	National	2023	18+			49	

== Maps ==
European Monitoring Centre for Drugs and Drug Addiction has an interactive cannabis use map of Europe. One can select by recall period: last month, last year, or lifetime. Also by age: young adults (15–34), or adults (15–64). Hover over a country for the data.

A non-interactive map is below.

Lifetime prevalence of cannabis use among all adults (aged 15 to 64 years old) in nationwide surveys among the general population. Data taken from European Monitoring Centre for Drugs and Drug Addiction (see Commons image page for latest sourcing info). See the table for what percent of an age range used cannabis by country.

== See also ==
- Annual cannabis use by country
- Legality of cannabis
- Decriminalization of non-medical marijuana in the United States
- Effects of cannabis
- Legal and medical status of cannabis
- Legality of cannabis by country
- Removal of cannabis from Schedule I of the Controlled Substances Act
- Single Convention on Narcotic Drugs
