= 2025 Slovenian assisted dying referendum =

- 23 November 2025
- Are you in favor of implementing the Assisted Voluntary End of Life Act (ZPPKŽ), which was adopted by the National Assembly at its session on July 24, 2025?
- Outcome: Failed

Results
Choice	Votes	%
Yes	323,047	46.56%
No	370,802	53.44%
Valid votes	693,849	99.65%
Invalid or blank votes	2,445	0.35%
Total votes	696,294	100.00%
Registered voters/turnout	1,695,039	41.08%
- Results by electoral district For Against

A binding referendum was held in Slovenia on 23 November 2025 regarding the Assisted Voluntary End of Life Act. The National Assembly passed the Act in July after voters had backed it in a nonbinding referendum in 2024. However, a citizens' initiative led by right-wing politician Aleš Primc forced a referendum on the act.

== Results ==
Choice	Votes	%
For	323,047	46.56
Against	370,802	53.44
Total	693,849	100.00
Valid votes	693,849	99.65
Invalid/blank votes	2,445	0.35
Total votes	696,294	100.00
Registered voters/turnout	1,695,039	41.08
Source: Volitve

== See also ==
- 2024 Slovenian referendum
- Assisted suicide
