= Cannabis in Suriname =

Cannabis in Suriname is illegal. Cannabis is the most popular illegal drug in Suriname.

== Prohibition ==
Cannabis was banned in Suriname (then a Dutch colony) in the early years of the 20th century. The drug had been popularized by the arrival of Asian immigrants in the colony. In 1921 the Surinamese Immigrants' Association requested that the ban on ganja be lifted and an import and sales concession be granted to them.

== Cultivation ==
A 1982 report noted that cannabis was becoming more popular in Suriname, and was grown in abandoned plantations near the coastal plains, primarily for local consumption. A 1998 report noted anecdotal data that cannabis was cultivated in Suriname, but the amounts were unknown.

During the 2005 Caribbean Week of Agriculture, the Surinamese Minister of Agriculture stated: We know that we have problems with fertile soil. We know that our food import bill is too high. So when we talk about marijuana, personally, for Suriname, I [do] not agree at this moment to [say] let our farmers start producing marijuana. What we are stimulating is produce food for our people.

== Smuggling ==
Suriname is noted as a key transshipment point for the smuggling of cannabis and cocaine to Europe. The Brazilian town of Belém was noted as a particular contact point in the trade, given its proximity to Suriname and large Surinamese population.
