= Surinamese Immigrants' Association =

The Surinamese Immigrants' Association (Dutch: Surinaamsche Immigranten Vereniging) was formed in 1910 in Suriname, then the Dutch colony of Surinam. The association's goal was to advocate for the interests of the East Indian diaspora in Suriname, particularly contract laborers.

In 1921 the Association requested that the ban on ganja (cannabis) be lifted and an import and sales concession be granted to them.
