= 2024 Slovenian referendum =

Non-binding referendum on four questions

A four-question non-binding referendum was held in Slovenia on 9 June 2024. The questions were:

- Should Slovenia allow the cultivation and processing of cannabis for medical purposes on its territory?
- Should Slovenia allow the cultivation and possession of cannabis for limited personal use on its territory?
- Are you in favor of adopting a law that will regulate the right to medically assisted dying?
- Are you in favor of introducing open lists for the elections of deputies to the National Assembly, which will ensure that voters have a decisive influence on the choice of a deputy?

== Results ==
Question	For		Against		Invalid/ blank	Total votes	Registered voters	Turnout	Outcome
Question	Votes	%	Votes	%	Invalid/ blank	Total votes	Registered voters	Turnout	Outcome
Medical cannabis	462,292	66.71	230,724	33.29	7,923	700,939	1,692,371	41.42	Approved
Cannabis for personal use	356,944	51.57	335,183	48.43	8,759	700,886	1,692,371	41.41	Approved
Voluntary euthanasia	378,917	54.89	311,429	45.11	10,651	700,997	1,692,371	41.42	Approved
Election reform	486,516	70.89	199,744	29.11	14,593	700,853	1,692,371	41.41	Approved
Source: Volitve

== See also ==
- Cannabis in Slovenia
