= Cannabis in the Turks and Caicos Islands =

Cannabis is illegal in the Turks and Caicos Islands. Although the islands are a British Overseas Territory and their legal system is based on English common law, the islands are a separate legal jurisdiction to the United Kingdom and have their own laws.

== Laws ==
Cannabis and cannabis resin are designated Class B Drugs under Part II of the Control of Drugs Ordinance 1976.

=== Possession ===
Under Section 6(2) of the Control of Drugs Ordinance 1976, it is an offence for any person to have cannabis in their possession.

=== Sentence ===
Anyone convicted of possession of cannabis, is liable under Schedule 4 of the Control of Drugs Ordinance 1976:

on summary conviction:

3 years' imprisonment or a fine of $40,000, or both.

before Supreme Court,

7 years' imprisonment or an unlimited fine, or both.

=== Possession with intent to supply ===
Under Section 6(3) of the Control of Drugs Ordinance 1976, it is an offence for any person to have cannabis in their possession, with intent to supply it to another person.

=== Sentence ===
Anyone convicted of possession of cannabis with intent to supply it to another, is liable under Schedule 4 of the Control of Drugs Ordinance 1976:

on summary conviction:

4 years' imprisonment or a fine of $50,000, or both.

before Supreme Court,

15 years' imprisonment or an unlimited fine, or both.

== See also ==
- Cannabis in the United Kingdom
