= Cannabis in Nigeria =

Cannabis is illegal in Nigeria, yet the country is a major source of West African-grown cannabis, and ranked the world's third highest consumer of cannabis.

Cannabis is widely grown across the States of Nigeria, including Lagos State, Edo State, Delta State, Osun State, Oyo State, Ogun State and Ondo State.

== History ==
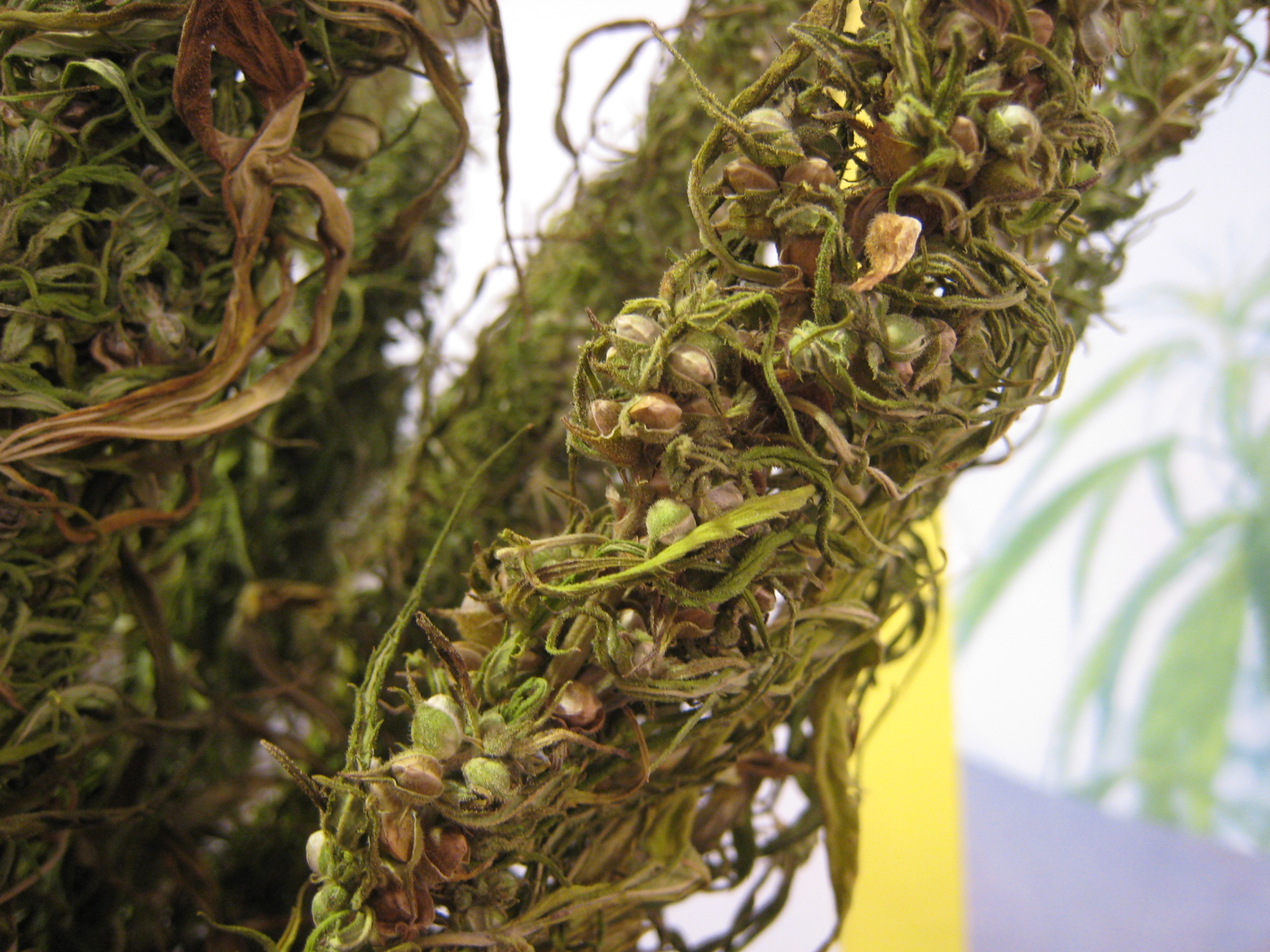
Dried seeds of Cannabis sativa.

Though cannabis has long been present in Eastern and Central Africa, as well as throughout North Africa, most scholars believe cannabis only gained traction in Nigeria in the 20th century. It is widely believed that cannabis was introduced to the area by soldiers and sailors returning from conflict zones in North Africa and the Far East during and after World War II, though some scholars have stated that British colonial authorities had engaged in small-scale cannabis and coca cultivation as early as the 1930s.

The cultivation of cannabis spread rapidly during the 1960s, thereby making it a public issue in Nigeria after its use by individuals and psychiatric patients. By the 1950s, arrests of Nigerian cannabis farmers are documented, as well as a small flow of Nigerian cannabis to the United States and Europe, and some import of cannabis from South Africa and the Belgian Congo.

During the early 1970s, the use of cannabis became common among soldiers who used it in order to suppress timidity. The use of cannabis became popular among youths between 1980 and 1990.

During Nigeria's second military Junta, the military rulers issued Decree 20, which made the death penalty an available punishment for drug trafficking, though this was used only sparingly, focused on cocaine, and removed in 1985. Nigeria strengthened its focus on cannabis eradication with the 1994 launch of "Operation Burn the Weeds", but the eradication program peaked in 1999 at 3500 hectares (versus 40 hectares in 1994) before falling substantially in the 2000s.

Despite Nigeria's role as a transshipment point for cocaine and heroin, throughout the 20th century cannabis remained the only illicit drug produced domestically.

=== Legislative history ===
In addition to international treaties to which Nigeria was a party, cannabis use in Nigeria was limited by a series of statutes, including the 1935 Dangerous Drugs Act while under British rule, and following independence the Indian Hemp Decree of 1966, and its amendments in 1975 and 1984. The 1966 decree recommended the death penalty for hemp cultivation, while the 1975 decree removed the threat of capital punishment, and the 1984 amendment increased penalties and jail terms.

In early 2019, the Governor of Ondo State, Rotimi Akeredolu, proposed the legalization of cannabis growing in his state for medical use. He repeated the call in early 2020.

== Usage ==
Cannabis is one of the most widely used illegal drugs in Nigeria. Cannabis has no recognized religious or medical use in the country. A study of secondary schools in Northern Nigeria, substance abuse ranged between 1.1 ‑ 3.5% with a male to female ratio of substance use of 3:1. 3% smoked cigarettes, benzodiazepines used by 3.5% and solvents by 1.5%. Use of cocaine and heroin was 1.1% and 1.3% respectively. A study carried out in about fourteen psychiatric hospitals in Lagos indicated that cannabis users accounted for 13.8% of all drug-related admissions in 1992.

== Legality and enforcement ==
Cannabis use and other related drug use is regulated by the National Drug Law Enforcement Agency in collaboration with the U.S. government to combat narcotic trafficking in West Africa. The possession of cannabis is illegal and is punishable by a minimum sentence of 12 years in prison. In serious trafficking cases, life imprisonment may be imposed.

The National Drug Law Enforcement Agency, in 2011 commenced night patrols on major roads in Osun State to combat and intercept trucks that are usually used to traffic cannabis. In an annual report of the National Drug Law Enforcement Agency in 2014, 3,271 suspected drug traffickers made up of 3,062 male and 209 female offenders were arrested with a total quantity of 205,373 kg of cannabis seized.

== Cannabis culture ==
In addition to such widespread international terms as marijuana, hemp, ganja, and pot, cannabis in Nigeria is also referred to by terms such as kaya, wee-wee, igbo, oja, gbana, blau, kpoli, kpocha and abana.

== See also ==
- Opioid addiction in Nigeria
- Adult lifetime cannabis use by country
