= Cannabis in Latvia =

Cannabis in Latvia is illegal for recreational and medical purposes, but production of industrial hemp is permitted.

Possession of quantities up to 1 gram are fined up to 280 euro, for second offences within a year period criminal charges are applied. Possession of larger quantities can be punished with up to 15 years imprisonment.

== History ==
=== 1918-1940 ===
During the first period of Latvian independence, use of cannabis was not prohibited and not widespread, although during that period use of other drugs such as cocaine and morphine were also not prohibited, with sale of those drugs restricted to pharmacies.

Latvia participated in the First International Opium Convention of 1912, which dealt with limiting the international trade of opium and cocaine products.

On 19 February 1925, the Convention added restriction on cannabis extracts and tinctures, but not on herbal cannabis. This version of the Convention entered into force on 25 September 1928.

On 26 June 1936, the UN set up the first international treaty providing for the criminalization of opium, coca, and cannabis products in non-medical and non-scientific production and distribution (Convention for the Suppression of the Illicit Traffic in Dangerous Drugs). It was signed by only a few countries; Latvia and Lithuania did not sign, Estonia signed it but not ratified.

=== Soviet Union ===
Throughout the territory of the USSR there was a law that penalized marijuana smuggling and trade with 1–3 years in prison or forced labor, but without penalties for possession or use.

Cannabis was banned in the USSR in 1974 with the law On combating policy in the fight against drug addiction. This law also harshened penalties for drug trafficking.Since then, the territory of the USSR the term "narcotics" began to be applied to all prohibited substances, not only opiates.

=== 1990–Present ===
After the collapse of the USSR the number of people who have used cannabis products was very low (below 2%). In the 1990s marijuana's popularity grew rapidly and reached Western levels, nowadays it continues to grow slightly. Since independence, not only marijuana trafficking and production, but also the possession has been criminalized. It is governed by the 1961 30 March United Nations Single Convention on Narcotic Drugs, which Latvia signed on 11 May 1993.

== Prevalence of use ==
In Latvia, cannabis products (marijuana and hashish) is the most commonly used illicit substance. A 2007 study showed 12.1% of Latvians aged 15-64 have used marijuana. This represents an increase compared with a 2003 study, where the proportion of cannabis product users was 10.6%. In the same 2007 study, it was shown that the rates were much higher in the 15–34 age group at 21.7%.

Riga City Councils Welfare Department has also conducted repeated studies among the youngest age group (9th- and 10th-grade students). In this age group, 22.7% of students reported having tried cannabis products in 2010. This represented a slight increase compared with previous years: 22% in 2008 and 18% in 2006.

According to data from the Center for Disease Prevention and Control, 72 people were treated for cannabis-related addiction in 2010. Compared with other psychotropic substances, this number was relatively low. In contrast, the number of people treated for alcohol addiction in late 2010 was 24,998-more than eight times higher.

== Legal status ==
Latvian marijuana production, distribution and use is also against the law. Marijuana or cannabis is included in the Ministry of Welfare under the control of narcotic drugs, psychotropic substances and precursors in List I - Prohibited especially dangerous narcotic drugs and psychotropic substances treated as such ). The marijuana use or storage of up to 1 gram can order the administrative penalty to 280 euros or a warning. In addition, be issued a written warning of criminal liability, if the violation will be repeated during the year. For storage of larger amounts of marijuana, growing and distribution can be sentenced to prison, in some cases up to 15 years. In practice, people with no previous convictions receive a milder punishment - a conditional sentence. Latvian marijuana medical marijuana is not used because of the location in the drug list.

=== Decriminalization initiative ===
In 2012 the public initiative platform ManaBalss.lv collected signatures for the 'marijuana decriminalization", to remove criminal penalties for cultivation and possession of small amounts of cannabis by those over 18. Under the proposed regulations, Latvians would be permitted to grow not more than two or three cannabis plants, and keep 20-30 grams of cannabis at home, and publicly carry no more than 5 grams.

On 24 March 2015 the cannabis decriminalization petition on ManaBalss.lv collected 10,005 signatures of citizens, which meant that the initiative may be submitted to Latvian Parliament. On May 18, the new initiative representative Donats Blaževičs published 100 arguments for marijuana decriminalization initiative to support the site 100argumenti.lv.

Parliament declined this initiative on September 3.
