= Cannabis in Portugal =

Legality of cannabis in Europe Legal for recreational use Legal for medical use Illegal

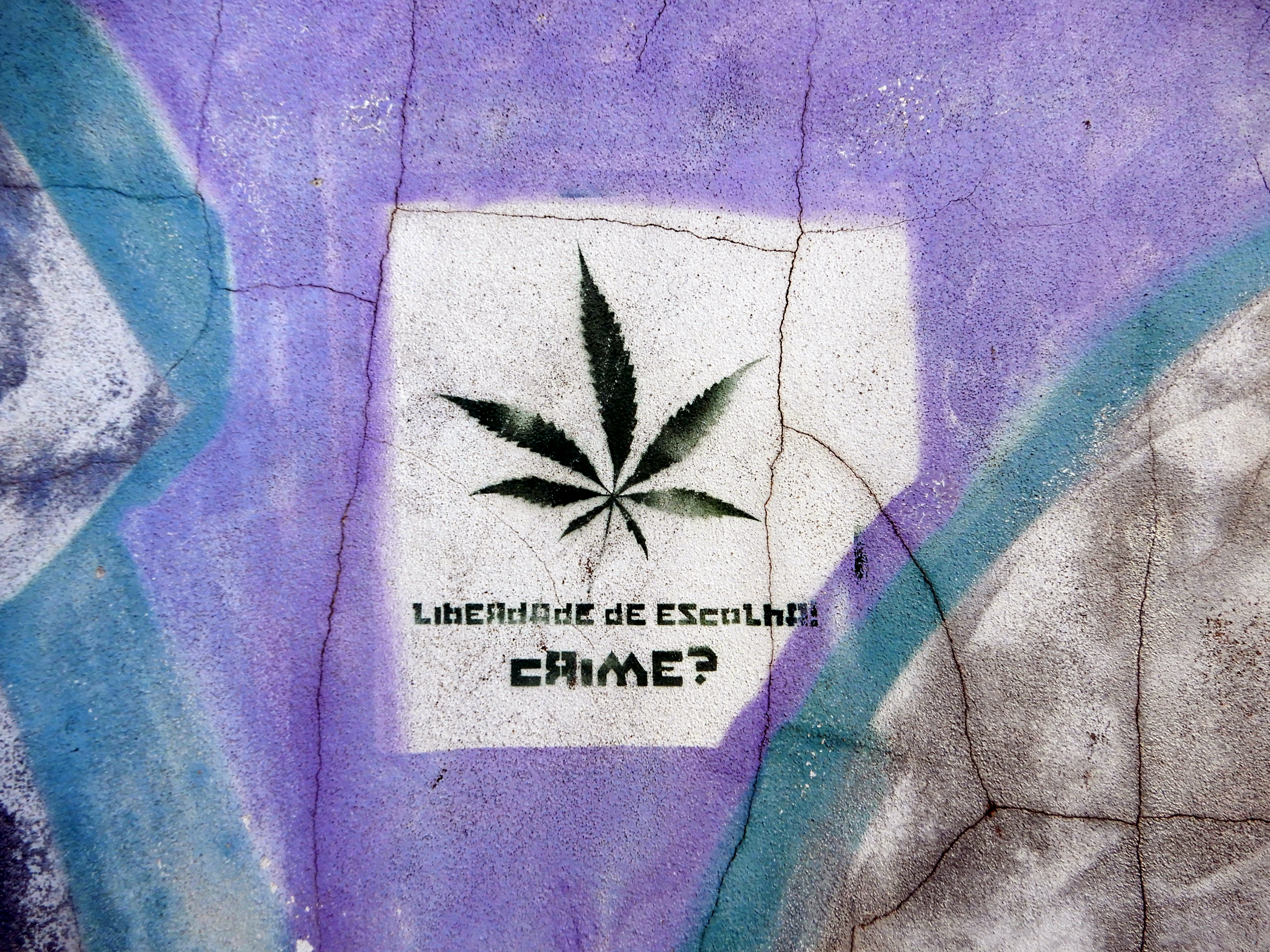
Graffiti in Portugal against criminalization of cannabis

Cannabis in Portugal is decriminalized, as a result of the decriminalization of all drugs in Portugal in 2001. Medical use of cannabis was legalized in 2018.

== History ==
=== Portuguese overseas colonies ===
==== Goa ====
Following the Portuguese seizure of Goa in 1510, the Portuguese became familiar with the cannabis customs and trade in India. Garcia da Orta, a botanist and physician, wrote about the uses of cannabis in his 1534 work Colloquies on the Simples and Drugs and Medicinal Matters of India and of a Few Fruits. Fifteen years later Cristobal Acosta produced the work A Tract about the Drugs and Medicines of the East Indies, outlining recipes for bhang.

The 1919 work Glossário luso-asiatico noted the use of cannabis in Portugal's Indian colony of Goa:

O bangue é formado por folhas secas e hastes tentras de cânhamo (Canabis sativa, Lin.) que se fumam ou mascam e que embriaga como o ópio.
(Bangue is made of dry leaves and tender stems of hemp, which they smoke or chew, and it intoxicates like opium.)

==== Brazil ====
Cannabis was introduced to Brazil by the Portuguese colonists in the early 1800s. Their intent may have been to cultivate hemp fiber, but the enslaved Africans the Portuguese displaced from the west coast of Africa were familiar with cannabis and used it psychoactively, leading the Municipal Council of Rio de Janeiro in 1830 to prohibit bringing cannabis into the city, and punishing its use by any slave.

== Decriminalisation ==
Possession of cannabis in Portugal is decriminalised in amounts for personal use, considered to be up to 25 g of plant material or 5 g of hashish. In 2001 Portugal decriminalised all illegal drugs, meaning that possession of personal amounts (a 10-day supply) is not subject to any penalties for a first-time offense. Subsequent offenses may be subject to civil penalties or mandated treatment.

== Legalisation ==
The political parties Liberal Initiative, Left Bloc and LIVRE support the legalisation of cannabis in Portugal.

== Medical use ==
In July 2018, legislation was signed into law to allow for the medical use of cannabis in Portugal and its dispensation at pharmacies. Personal cultivation for medical use remains against the law. As a result, importing of medical cannabis to Portugal has become a promising business opportunity for local entrepreneurs and cannabis companies.
