= Cannabis in Turkey =

- Location of Turkey (dark green)
- Medicinal: Legal for low-level THC products only (less than 0.3%)
- Recreational: Illegal

Cannabis is illegal in Turkey for recreational use, but allowed for limited medical and scientific purposes. The Turkish term for cannabis is kenevir.

== Medical use ==
In 2016, legislation was approved to allow the use of sublingual cannabinoid medications (such as Sativex) for use with a doctor's prescription. Use of whole-plant cannabis remains illegal.

In 2025, Decree Law No. 663 was accepted by the Health, Family, Labor and Social Affairs Committee of the Grand National Assembly of Turkey, which legalized medical usage of cannabis-derived products containing less than 0.3% THC via distribution through pharmacies.

== Cultivation ==
The cultivation of marijuana is legal in 19 provinces in Turkey for medicinal and scientific purposes. However, with permission this can also be conducted in other provinces as well.

In 2019, President Recep Tayyip Erdoğan mentioned that Turkey might grow industrial hemp, in which he said: "I am calling out to my nation; let's start the process to cultivate industrial hemp. We will see that industrial hemp has many different benefits in many different areas."

== Demographics ==
According to sewage surveys which examine drug metabolites in wastewater, cannabis is the most popular illicit drug (being followed by heroin and cocaine) and third most used surveyed psychoactive substance after alcohol and nicotine in Istanbul. The low-income neighbourhoods have been noted to have higher rates of cannabis consumption. Compared to selected metropolitan areas in Europe, United States, Oceania and China, Istanbul had the second highest consumption rate of cannabis after Barcelona. Istanbul was followed by Adana, another city in Turkey, in terms of global cannabis consumption rate.

== Enforcement ==
Consuming any drug (personal use or not) is illegal and requires juridical process. Possessing, purchasing or receiving any illegal drug, including Cannabis, is punishable by 1–2 years in prison; there is also the option of treatment and/or probation for up to three years. If users refuse treatment or do not comply with probation requirements, the courts can decide on sentencing.

Sale and supply is punishable by a prison term of 5–10 years, and production or trafficking by a minimum term of 10 years.
