= Cannabis in Slovakia =

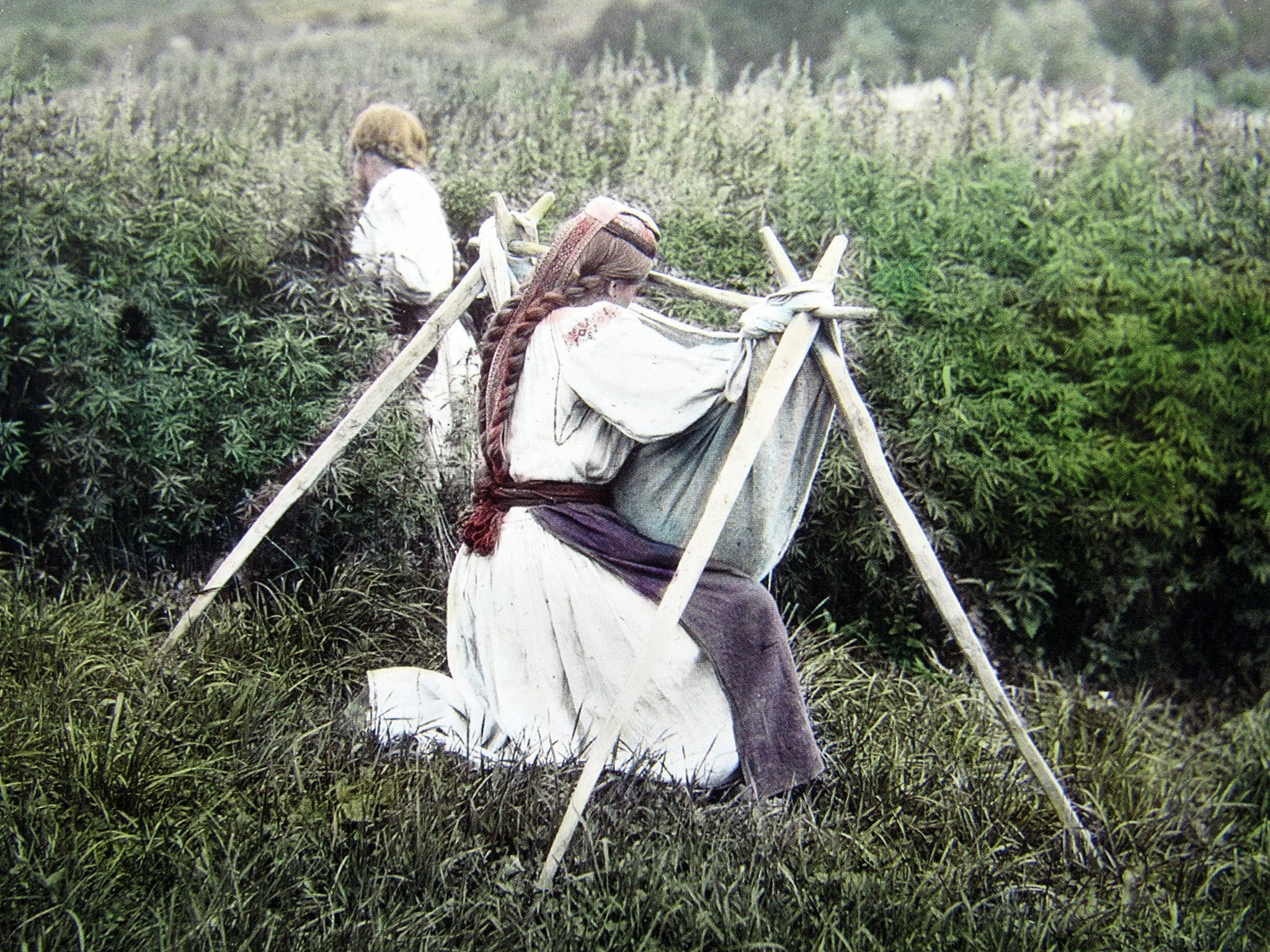
From Subcarpathian Ruthenia (now Ukraine), still part of Czechoslovakia, 1921

Cannabis in Slovakia is illegal for all purposes and possession of even small amounts of the drug can lead to lengthy prison terms. Possession or use of small amounts of cannabis (or only 1 joint) is punishable by up to eight years in prison. In April 2012, The Wall Street Journal reported that Robert Fico, the incoming Slovak prime minister, might push for partial legalisation of cannabis possession, and has argued for the legalisation of possession of up to three doses of cannabis for personal use.

== Proposed reform ==
In February 2018, The partial decriminalization of drugs was once proposed by the former Minister of Justice Lucia Žitňanská.

"For the first time, possession of a small amount of a drug should be punished as a misdemeanor and only in the case of repeated violations of the law within 12 months as a criminal offense. Under the age of 18, in addition to a fine, medical diagnosis, social counseling and, where appropriate, drug treatment should be automatically ordered".

The strongest government party (SMER-SD) did not like the decriminalization of hard drugs. Žitňanská proposed that the breach limit be reduced for marijuana (1 grams), cocaine (0.2 grams), methamphetamine (0.2 grams), heroin (0.5 grams) or 3 ecstasy tablets (0.8 grams). In the coalition, however, her proposal did not pass at that time, nor did it succeed in enforcing a slightly more conservative proposal by its successor, Gábor Gál. In both cases, the SNS was against the proposals. The SNS coalition party refuses to support the law at the government meeting. Because, in their words: "Demand for drugs will increase."

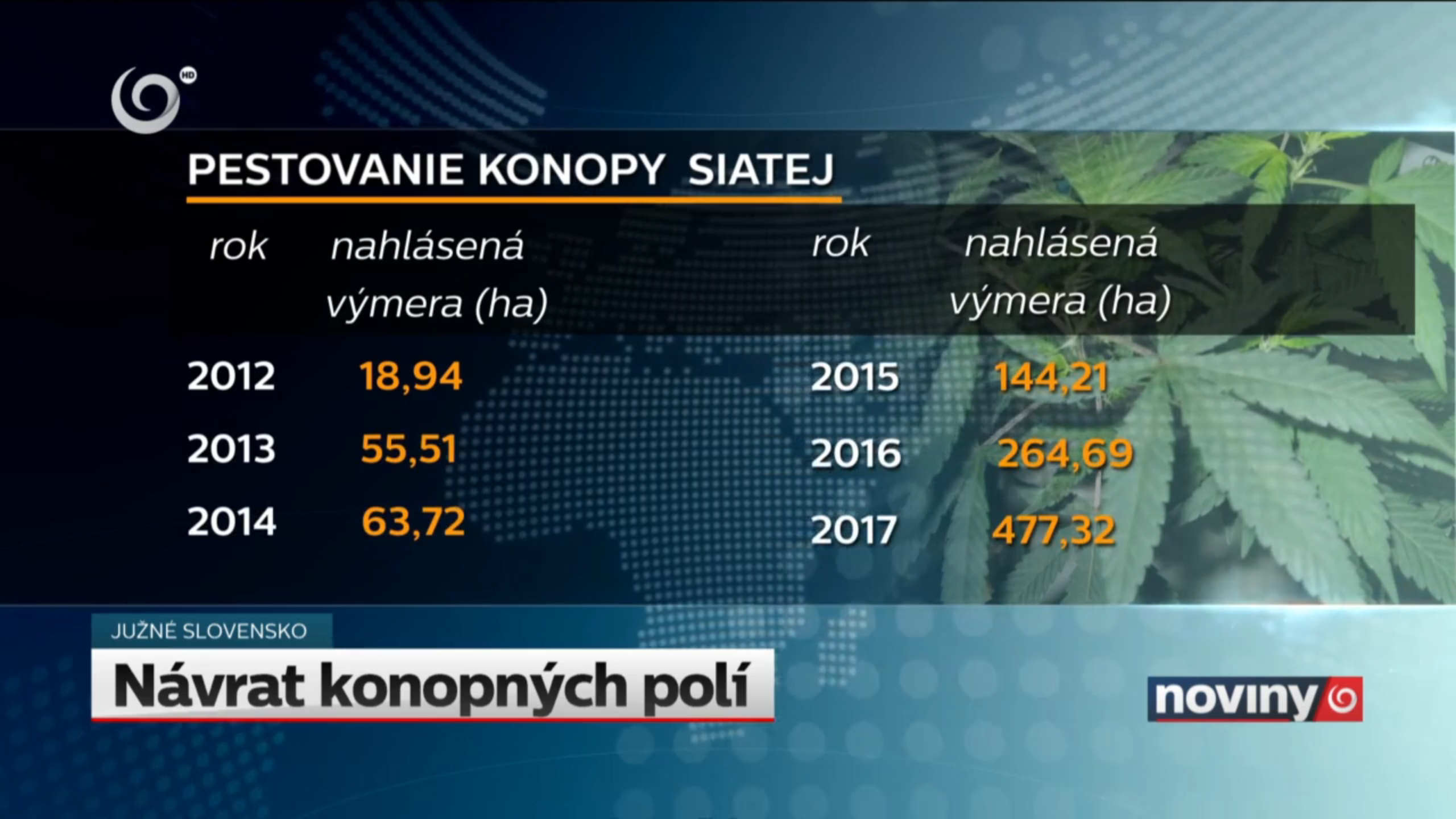
Return of industrial hemp fields in hectares, broadcast in TV JOJ news, 13.February 2019

== Decriminalization in 2024 ==
Possession of a small amount for personal use (2 grams of dried herb or up to 200mg of THC) was decriminalized in 2024.

== Legal status of CBD ==
Cannabidiol (CBD) was classified as a narcotic and psychotropic substance in Slovakia until 2021. Following an amendment to Act No. 139/1998 Coll. on narcotic drugs, psychotropic substances and preparations, CBD was removed from the list of these substances. The amendment entered into force on 1 May 2021.

CBD is legal in Slovakia provided that it is derived from industrial hemp and the content of tetrahydrocannabinol (THC) does not exceed the legally established limit. Under Slovak law, CBD products such as oils, capsules, dried hemp, or concentrates may contain up to 0.3% THC (since 2022), and there is no specific restriction on the amount of CBD that private individuals may possess. If this limit is respected, the products are considered fully legal.

Despite its legalization, the marketing of CBD products is subject to regulatory restrictions. Within the European Union, CBD is considered a “novel food”, and therefore its use in food and food supplements requires specific authorization. As a result, some CBD products on the Slovak market are sold as cosmetic products or collector’s items.

The cultivation of industrial hemp is permitted in Slovakia but is subject to administrative requirements and oversight by the relevant authorities.
