= Cannabis in Slovenia =

Legality of cannabis in Europe Legal for recreational use Legal for medical use Illegal

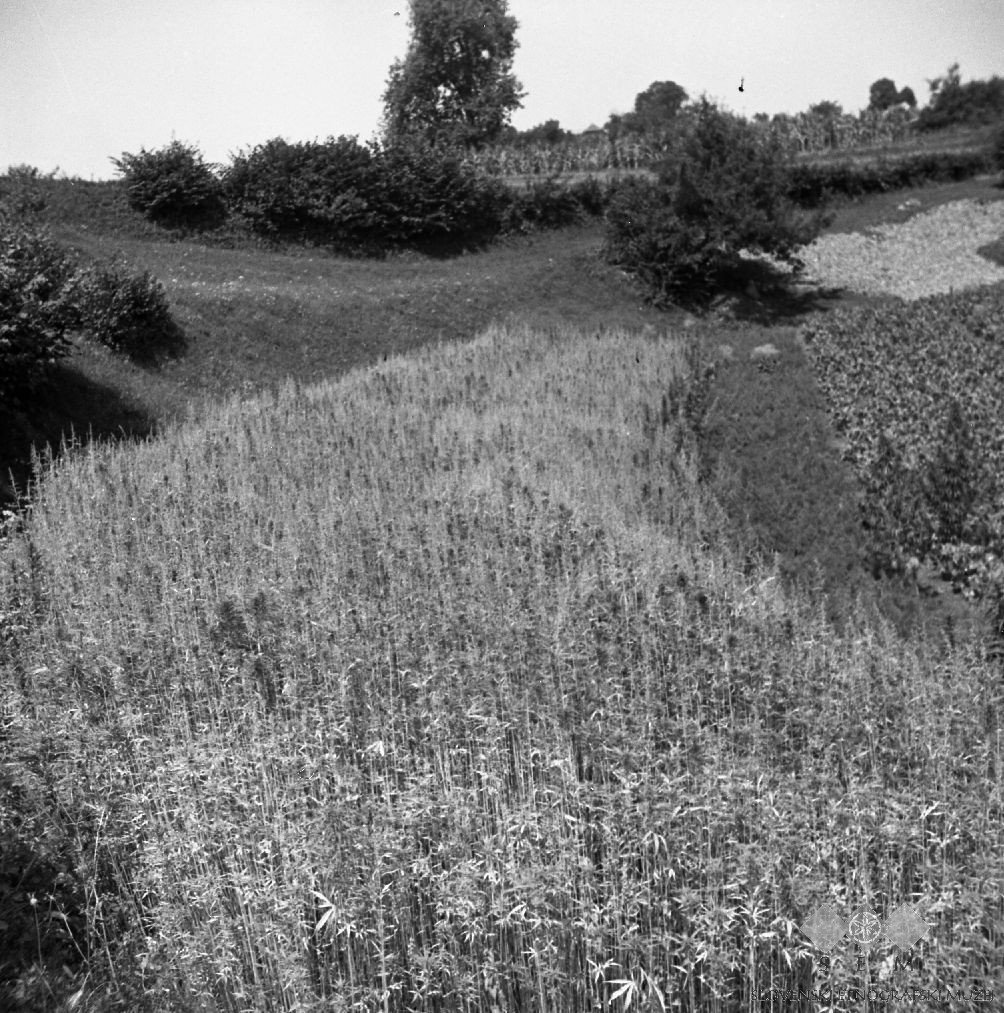
Cannabis field, Oštrc 1956

Cannabis in Slovenia is illegal but decriminalized for recreational use. Medical cannabis was legalized in 2025.

== Classification ==
In 2012, a proposal was drafted to decriminalize medical cannabis, but it failed to obtain the necessary support. A new proposal was drafted in 2013, which succeeded in gaining enough public support. As a result, the Slovenian government re-classified cannabinoids as Class II illegal drugs (from the original Class I), thus allowing for the medical use of cannabinoid drugs but not medical marijuana.

== Enforcement ==
The possession of any drug for personal use in small quantities is not registered as a criminal act in Slovenia, but it is instead a misdemeanor punishable by a fine of €36 to €179. It is in this sense that it is considered "decriminalized". This can be reduced further if the offender agrees to undergo treatment. This policy is similar to the one in force in Portugal.

== See also ==
- 2024 Slovenian referendum
