= Cannabis in Bulgaria =

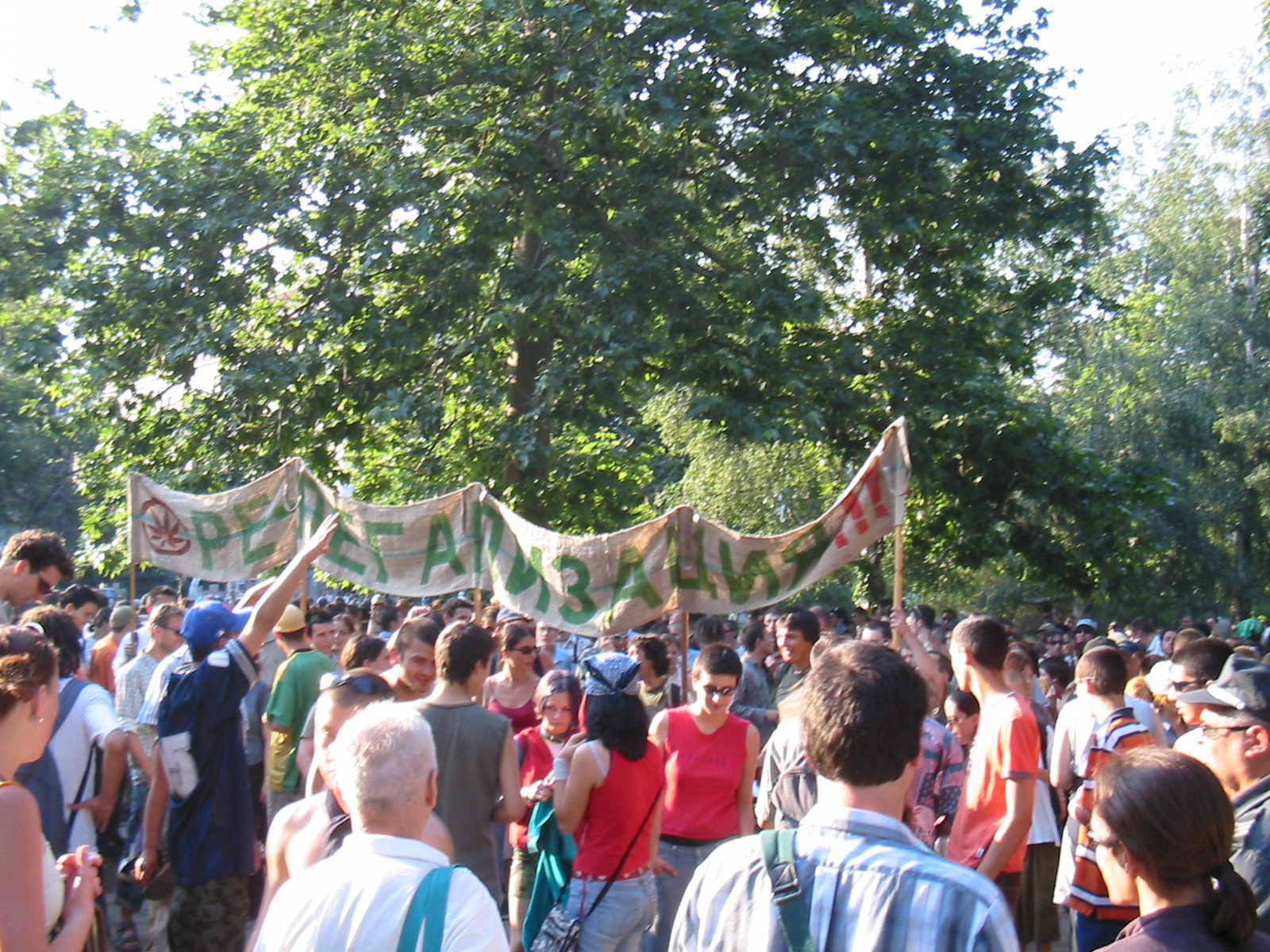
Demonstration by the Promena Movement in Sofia in 2003

Cannabis in Bulgaria is illegal, both for medical and recreational purposes. It is classified as a class A (high-risk) drug, together with heroin, cocaine, amphetamines and MDMA.

== Enforcement ==
Until 2004, a loosely defined "personal dose" existed. Since 2006, after the last amendment of the Penal Code, the penalty for possession is 1 to 6 years in prison and a fine between 1,000 and 5,000 euros. Many offenders have been prosecuted and effectively put in jail for possession of a single puff of a joint. For possession with an aim of distribution (drug-dealing), the sentence can range from 2 to 8 years for small amounts, to 3 to 12 years for large amounts, up to 5 to 15 years when executed by an organized criminal group. In these cases, the maximum fine to be determined together with the prison time is 50,000 euros. Growing is punishable by 2 to 5 years and a fine up to 5,000 euros. The organizer of a growers' group can receive a jail sentence of 10 to 20 years and has to pay a fine of up to 100,000 euros, a participant 3 to 10 years in prison and a fine of 2,500 to 5,000 euros.
