= Cannabis in Greece =

Legality of cannabis in Europe Legal for recreational use Legal for medical use Illegal

Cannabis in Greece is illegal for recreational purposes. In 2017, the Greek government legalized the use of cannabis for medical purposes, and a year later, they lifted the ban on growing or producing it. This enables pharmaceutical companies to grow cannabis legally, and industrial hemp suppliers too.

== History ==
In 1890, Greece outlawed the production and usage of hashish, but the laws were largely ineffective. Cannabis use rose following World War I, as Greek soldiers and refugees from now-Turkish Asia Minor arrived in mainland Greece, bringing the cannabis habit with them. This upsurge faded after World War II due to the substantial death and disorder of the German occupation.

== Medical cannabis ==
In July 2016, the Greek government formed a working group to assess the possibilities of medical cannabis, with a report to be issued in October.

In June 2017, Greek Prime Minister Alexis Tsipras announced that a joint ministerial decision regarding the legality of medical cannabis had been made. The decision, published in the Government Gazette, declared the medical use of cannabis to be legal for patients with a doctor's prescription. With the announcement, Tsipras commented "From now on, the country is turning its page, as Greece is now included in countries where the delivery of medical cannabis to patients in need is legal." In March 2018, the Greek Parliament approved a law authorizing the cultivation and production of medical cannabis in Greece.

Medical cannabis was legalized in 2017; however, prescriptions only became available in 2024 due to prolonged bureaucratic hurdles. Patients suffering from conditions such as cancer, epilepsy, or chronic pain can access cannabis in the form of oils or flowers.

== Punishments for drug addicts and dealers ==
Greek drug laws have become tolerant, and the minimum sentence for possession of marijuana has been reduced to 5 months .

Smoking in public is prohibited.
