= Cannabis in Belgium =

Legality of cannabis in Europe Legal for recreational use by adults Legal for medical use under certain conditions by adults Illegal

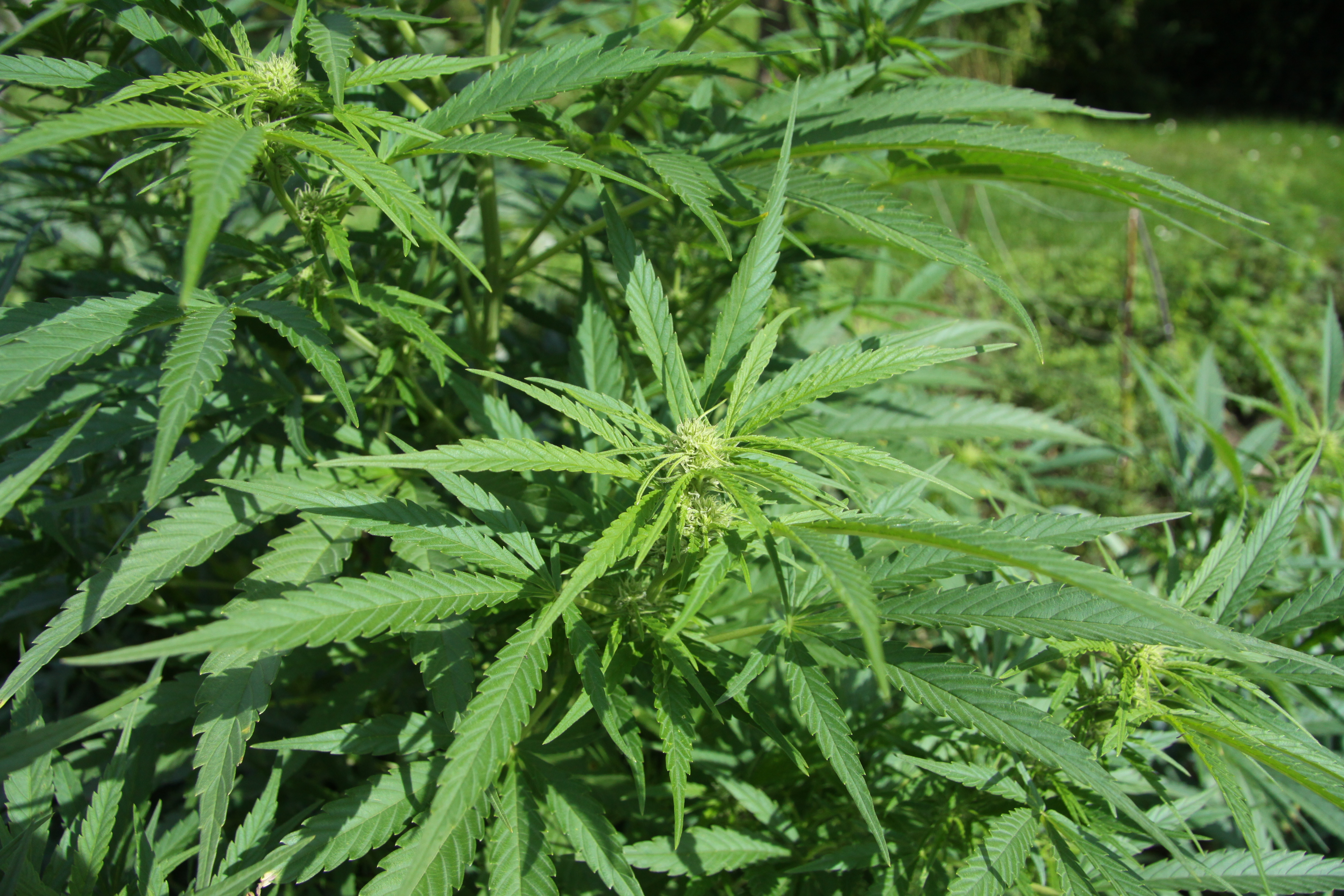
The cannabis plant can be consumed in a variety of ways.

Cannabis is one of the most popular controlled substances for cultivation and consumption within the country of Belgium. Following global trends, cannabis consumption rates in Belgium have been steadily increasing across the country since the 20th century, and cannabis cultivation continues to expand rapidly on a national scale. Despite significant legal rework of cannabis-related laws since 2010, certain elements of the consumption and cultivation of cannabis are considered to exist within a “legal grey area” of Belgian law. Cannabis is technically illegal in Belgium, but personal possession has been decriminalised since 2003; adults over the age of 18 are allowed to possess up to 3 grams. The legal effort to restrict cultivation and growth has gradually subsided, resulting in an increase of the growth and consumption of cannabis and cannabis-related products.

In June 2015, Maggie De Block signed a royal decree legalising certain uses of medical cannabis, which as of 2015 only include Sativex oral spray for multiple sclerosis.

== Growth ==
Prior to the 1990s there was very little cannabis cultivation within Belgium and the majority of cannabis consumed in the country had been imported from foreign growers. In 2003, the cultivation of cannabis for personal use (one female plant) was made legal within Belgium. Since then, an agricultural shift has occurred within which there has been a marked rise in the local growth of cannabis-related plants and a subsequent rapid decline in the importation of foreign cannabis plants. Cultivation continues to increase in popularity within the country, reaching such high levels that one study in 2015 found cannabis growth within Belgium to be ‘endemic’. The number of cannabis plants grown within Belgium increased by 440% in seven years, from 73,344 in 2006 to 396,758 in 2013. Although Belgian legal bodies continue to target cannabis cultivation facilities, the activity has been assessed as of medium-low harm, and the majority of the harms that were identified are largely the product of criminalising policies and attempts to oppress cultivation.

While the small scale cultivation of cannabis for personal use is tolerated within Belgium, large-scale production, especially that which could be intended for distribution, is prohibited and can result in intervention by law enforcement authorities. The rise in cannabis cultivation on a national scale has led to an increase in the number of cannabis cultivation facilities dismantled by Belgian law enforcement, increasing from 35 in 2003, to 1212 in 2013. The suppression of cannabis cultivation was categorised as high-priority in the National Security Plan of 2012-2015 and 2016-2019; concerns related to the marked increase in plantation-style growing, as well as a marked rise in violent activities and other forms of organised crime were cited as key reasons behind this decision.

Currently, most of the cannabis cultivated in Belgium is exported to the Netherlands, and once there it can be sold commercially, consumed in coffee shops, or exported further onwards to third destinations, particularly the United Kingdom and Scandinavia.

== Consumption ==
Percentage of cannabis use amongst adults within European countries. The dates of the information for each country varies between 2015 and 2022.

The consumption rates of cannabis in Belgium have gradually trended upwards since 2000, with the overall percentage of Belgians who consumed cannabis at least once per month increasing from 2.7% in 2001 to 4.3% in 2018. The region of Belgium with the highest recorded use is Brussels-Capital, reporting a rate of monthly use of 8.2% in 2018. This data aligns with the findings of the European Monitoring Centre for Drugs and Drug Addiction (EMCDDA). The marked increase has been attributed to the higher concentration of cannabis-selling shops and the rise of online based delivery services which have greatly increased the accessibility to cannabis in Belgium, particularly in the Brussels CBD region.

=== Cannabis Social Clubs ===
Along with several other European countries, cannabis social clubs are rising in popularity in Belgium. The first cannabis social club was Trekt Uw Plant, which was established in Antwerp in 2006 and is currently the most popular club. The structure and function of Belgian cannabis social clubs has been primarily modelled off of the highly successful Spanish cannabis social clubs. The operation of such clubs within Belgium relies upon the existence of loopholes within the legislation pertaining to cannabis consumption, and Trekt Uw Plant has been involved in two court cases, although neither of them lead to formal conviction. The members of Trekt Uw Plant cultivated and harvested cannabis formally as a club for the first time in 2010, and has continued to do so ever since without any interference from law-enforcement authorities.

A subdivision of Trekt Uw Plant based primarily in the northeast province of Limburg became an independent cannabis social club in April 2013. The club named itself the Mambo Social Club, and is located officially in the city of Hasselt. The Mambo Social Club has worked in tandem with Trekt Uw Plant to host workshops and information sessions designed to inform Belgian cannabis activists how to join, or create their own, cannabis social slub.

Three more cannabis social clubs were founded in November 2013, primarily in the French-speaking community of Belgium. Ma Weed Perso was established in the city of Liège, WeedOut was established in the city of Andenne, and Sativa was established in the city of Namur.

== Legality ==
Unlike possession or distribution (selling), the personal use of controlled substances, including cannabis, is not illegal under Belgian law. The possession First offence possession of cannabis for personal use is punishable only by a fine of up to 200 EUR, assuming there are no other aggravating circumstances present, making it legally distinguished from other illicit substances. From 2005 full prosecution is enacted for cases of possession wherein the carried amount exceeds 3 grams, or aggravating circumstances are identified including ‘blatant’ possession in a public place or an environment where children might be present. For instances where larger amounts are in possession, the details of the prosecution are dealt with on a case-by-case basis, leaving the boundaries of cultivation limits unclear.

As a member of the United Nations (UN), the European Union (EU), and the European Council (EC), Belgian drug policy is affected by international treaties which prohibit the large-scale production, distribution, and trade of cannabis. In the previous and ongoing developments of its drug policy, Belgium has remained within the frameworks of international and European law.

=== Legal history ===
The majority of laws in Belgium relating to controlled substances and other narcotics date back to 24 February 1921. The movement to criminalise drugs within the country was primarily influenced by policy changes internationally, and the global shift towards stricter control of drug substances. From 1919 there was an observed rise of drug use within Belgium, specifically cocaine and morphine. Although this was widely believed to be a direct consequence of the prohibition of the sale and public consumption of alcohol after the Law of 29 August 1919 (commonly referred to as the Vandervelde Law), experts now understand the rise in drug use to be a consequence of the devastation of World War I. The Minister of Justice Emile Vandervelde, who led a widely successful campaign to prohibit alcohol use across the country in 1919, also advocated for a strong response to the use of other drugs than alcohol and directly instigated the drafting of the new Belgian Law of 24 February 1921. The doctrines of Adolphe Prins formed the basis of the first Belgian drug law of 1921, with the design of the law reflecting his push for restorative approaches towards criminal punishments.

The first major revision of Belgian drug policy occurred in 1975, with the Law of 9 July 1975 that sought to address the growing concerns of judicial authorities that the punishment for drug use did not properly address the nature of the crime. The law was submitted by then Minister of Justice Alfons Vranckx (nl) alongside then Minister of Public Health Louis Nam che, with the primary purpose of the law being the allowance of stronger enforcement to prevent drug trafficking, although the law also included a public denunciation clause regarding the act of drug consumption. Under this law cannabis was classified alongside other illicit drugs and it remained prohibited to possess any amount of the substance. The concept of aggravating circumstances was introduced, allowing for prosecutors to distinguish in their convictions between drug-related crimes that were considered victimless (such as personal use in private property) and those that were seen as endangering of others (such as drug use in an environment with children). Vranckx questioned the purpose and effectiveness of punishing drug use, even investigating an alternative form of legal action by making drug treatment compulsory for convicted offenders. This was eventually rejected in favour of an extension of the Law of 29 June 1964 which gave prosecutors an increased ability to release minor offenders without charge by putting them on probation.

The second major revision of Belgian drug policy occurred in 1994, with the Law of 14 July 1994 that sought to distinguish the legal treatment of antiseptics and other toxic substances when compared to narcotics and psychotropic substances, which were deemed likely to cause addiction. Cannabis remained under the general category of "controlled substance" and was not distinguished from other illicit drugs.

The Belgian government ceased all prosecution for personal consumption and growth of cannabis in 2001, with the understanding that it was not an inherently problematic activity. The laws of 4 April 2003 and 3 May 2003, as we as the Royal Decree of 16 May 2003, implemented specific guidelines which distinguished the legal status and treatment of cannabis from other controlled substances.

=== Legalisation efforts ===
Since 2001, the legal status cannabis within Belgium has been a growing area of political interest and debate. In 2019, the leader of the French-speaking Socialist Party, Elio Di Rupo, announced his party's plan to resubmit legislation which would legalise cannabis nationwide. The rationale cited for this decision focused on the idea that legalisation would prevent young people from having to engage with a criminal network dominated by ‘mafia-like’ elements in order to acquire the substance. This announcement was met with criticism from an opposition party, the Christian democrats (cdH), with the party's leader, Catherine Fonck, stating that the cdH will do "everything possible to not include the legalization of cannabis (except therapeutic) in the federal government agreement."

== Medicinal cannabis ==
In Belgium, the use of cannabis for medicinal purposes is legal under specific circumstances, and is increasing in prevalence. Since 2015, pharmacists and general practitioners in Belgium have been legally allowed to distribute “prepackaged” cannabis-based medicines, such as Sativex®, as well as cannabidiol (“CBD”) powder. It remains prohibited to dispense products or medication containing one or more tetrahydrocannabinols (“THC”), according to the Royal Decree of 11 June 2015. While the cultivation of cannabis remains a legal grey-area under Belgian law, individuals requiring medicinal cannabis are technically able to cultivate their own personal growth as long as they follow the restrictions outlined by the legislation of July 1, 2019.
