= Cannabis in Norway =

Legality of cannabis in Europe Legal for recreational use by adults Legal for medical use under certain conditions by adults Illegal

Cannabis in Norway is strictly legalized for limited medicinal use; all other purposes are illegal.

== Decriminalization ==
In December 2017, the Norwegian Parliament's sub-committee on health announced their intention to decriminalize personal drug use, providing medical treatment to users rather than fines and imprisonment. In March 2018, the government created a working group to prepare the reform in drug policy. The group provided its recommendation to the government by 31 December 2019. In the group's given mandate, the police were handed the responsibility to "impose health related measures on drug addicts." Not complying with measures imposed by police "will lead to sanctions."

As of 16 April 2021, this bill did not pass parliament. 6 parties (43.8%) voted for, while 3 parties (56.2%) voted against.

On 18 May 2022, the Norwegian Attorney General published new guidelines based on Supreme Court judgements. Drug addicts' use, acquisition and possession of small amounts of drugs for personal use will no longer be punishable. The Attorney General has decided that doubt is to benefit the accused in cases where there is any indication of drug addiction.

The Attorney General decided in 2021 that the police do not have the right to search mobile phones, perform drug tests or search the homes of people who are caught with small amounts of drugs for personal use.

== Medical use ==
As of 2016, Norwegian law left the door open for a small group of patients with serious illnesses – such as those with cancer and/or those in severe pain – who do not find relief from other medicines to use medical cannabis. As of 25 November 2016, only one person in Norway had been approved the right to legally use medical cannabis.

== Reform efforts ==
Norway has traditionally been one of the strictest countries in Europe in regards to cannabis, but this is changing, mainly due to the work of reform groups such as the Association for Humane Drug Policies and the Norwegian NORML as well as influence from international human rights organizations.

Young Liberals of Norway, the youth league of the Norwegian political party Venstre, supports the legalization and regulation of drugs such as cannabis. This is also supported by the Green Party.

== Enforcement ==
Up to 15 g is considered an amount for personal use, and is punished with a fine in the case of first-time offenders; possessing more is punished more harshly. Repeat offenders or dealers can face prison charges. The type of fine given for drug offences are of the more serious category, and will appear on a criminal record. Young first-time offenders are routinely compelled to consent to regular supervised drug testing to avoid prosecution. Up to 1 kg is punished with up to 2 years in prison. If the amount is larger, the limit is 10 years. Amounts over 80 kg are punished with sentences of 3 to 15 years, and in very serious cases up to 21 years is permitted.
