= Cannabis in Colombia =

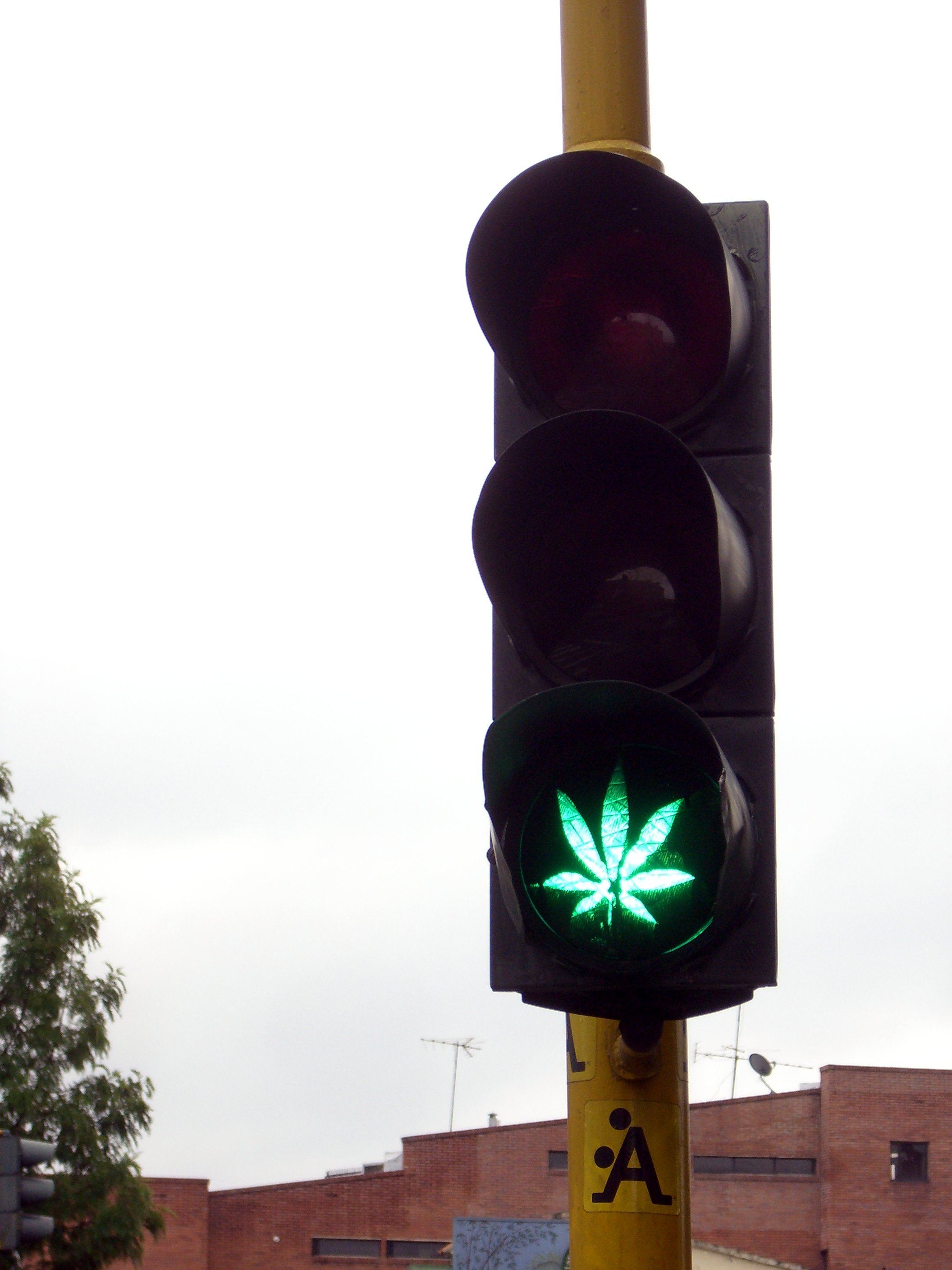
Cannabis traffic light sign in Bogotá

In Colombia, cannabis has a nuanced legal framework that has evolved significantly over recent decades. Since 2016, cannabis has been fully legal for medicinal purposes, allowing its cultivation, processing, distribution, and commercialization under strict regulation. This has fostered a growing pharmaceutical and research industry. Subsequently, in 2021, the legislation expanded to include its industrial use, opening the door to the production of hemp and other non-psychoactive derivatives for various sectors like textiles, food, and construction.

However, cannabis for recreational purposes maintains a partially legal status. Since 1994, self-cultivation for personal consumption, possession, and consumption of minimal doses have been decriminalized by decisions of the Constitutional Court, recognizing them as part of the right to free personal development. Despite this, the commercialization of recreational cannabis remains illegal. This creates a peculiar situation where consumption is permitted but its acquisition through formal channels is prohibited, thus continuing to fuel the illicit market.

== History ==
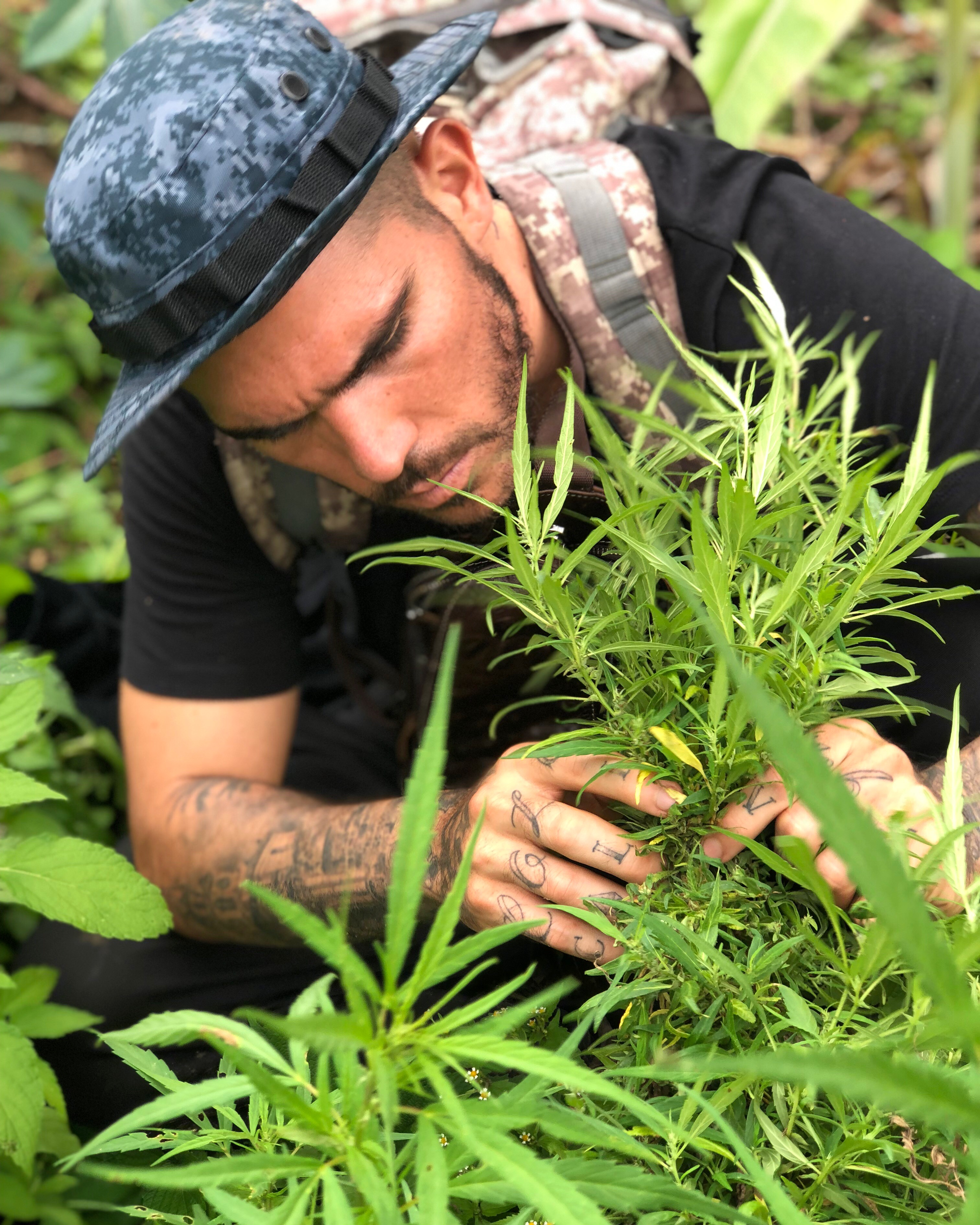
Cannabis plantation at Sierra Nevada de Santa Marta

Cannabis has been cultivated in Colombia since the late colonial period, when hemp was grown for its industrial fibres. However even at that early state, cannabis was recognized for its psychoactive uses, but these remained largely confined to the fringes of Colombian society, and discouraged by the Catholic church and national law. By the 1920s, possibly spurred by wider cannabis use in the Caribbean, recreational use of cannabis emerged in the Atlantic ports, particularly Barranquilla, leading the Colombian government to further restrict cannabis in 1939 and 1946.

In the 1960s and 1970s, North American cannabis traffickers made inroads into Colombia, leading to booming production in the Sierra Nevada de Santa Marta and the Urabá peninsula, where cannabis was smuggled in the region's massive northward shipments of bananas.

According to the academic Steven Bender, marijuana from Colombia is known as "Colombian", as referenced in the American rock duo Steely Dan's 1980 song "Hey Nineteen".

== Decriminalization ==
In 1994 the Constitutional Court of Colombia ruled that possession of cannabis and other drugs in amounts for personal use was legal. In 2012 the Colombian government officially decriminalized the possession of up to 20 grams of cannabis. In 2015 the Colombian Supreme Court ruled that cultivation of up to 20 cannabis plants was allowed.

== Medical cannabis ==
In 2015, president Juan Manuel Santos signed legislation allowing cannabis and derivatives for medical uses, and establishing guidelines for dispensaries.
