= Cannabis in Hungary =

Cannabis in Hungary is a plant known and cultivated since ancient times, but its recreational use is illegal today.

According to archaeological findings, the cultivation of hemp in western Hungary became more intensive during the Iron Age Hallstatt period (c. 1200–450 BCE). Cannabis has a long pharmaceutical history in Hungary, as it was included in the first (1871), second (1888), and third (1909) official editions of the Hungarian Pharmacopoeia (Magyar Gyógyszerkönyv).

There is no distinction in Hungarian law between prohibited drugs: use of cannabis has the same legal consequences as heroin use. Hungarian law prohibits distribution and use, including medical use; the punishment for distribution is higher than for personal use. 283. § (1) paragraph (a) states that "One cannot be punished for drug misuse; if a small, personal amount is produced, acquired, or in possession..." and continues to state that "... provided that before a final verdict is determined a verification is provided that continuous 6-month therapy has taken place" The law determines that a "personal quantity" is defined as 1 gram of active substance (i.e. THC), equivalent to 12–100 grams of marijuana assuming that marijuana contains 1–8% THC per unit mass. Possession of larger amounts can lead to a five to ten year prison sentence.

Cultivation: Growing cannabis is illegal, regardless of the scale, and is prosecuted similarly to possession and trafficking.

CBD and Hemp: CBD products are legal only if they contain less than 0.2% THC. Industrial hemp cultivation is permitted under strict regulations, but the approach to CBD products is cautious and not fully clarified in law

According to a 2019 article, cannabis for medical use is legal in theory, as some Sativex prescriptions have been made, but patients can rarely get it prescribed and the price is high.

Since 2013 the possession of 12g to 100g of cannabis (with approximately 1% THC content) is punishable by up to 8 years in prison, with imprisonment up to life for possession of larger quantities.

== Public demonstrations for cannabis outlawed ==
The 420 cannabis event on April 20, 2025 in Budapest may have been the last public demonstration for cannabis allowed in Hungary. This is due to the April 14, 2025 passage of the 15th amendment to the Fundamental Law of Hungary that, among other things, prohibits the "promotion" of drugs. The police tried to ban the April 20 event, but the Supreme Court overturned its ban saying that the ban had been made prior to the adoption of the amendment.
