= Cannabis in Peru =

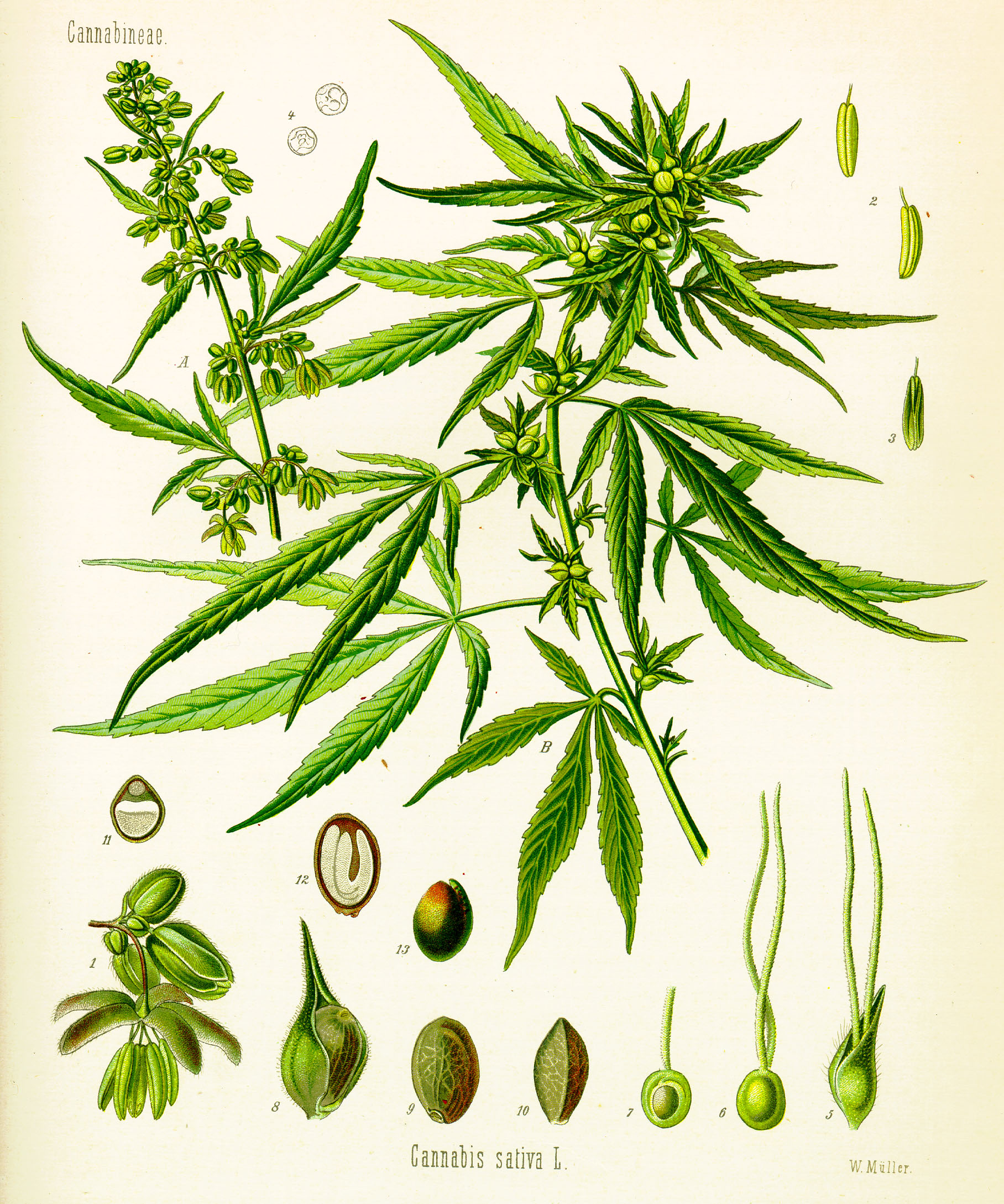
Illustration of hemp

Cannabis in Peru is not legal for recreational use, possession for own consumption is also decriminalized by the Criminal Code and medical cannabis was legalized in 2017.

== Enforcement ==
Possession of under 8 grams is considered personal use and it is not punished.

Cultivation, production or sale is punished with 8 to 15 years in prison. While cultivation for one's own consumption is legal, provided there is no intent to distribute, police and prosecutors may treat even a small number of plants as potential trafficking cases.

== Medical cannabis ==
In 2017, the administration of President Pedro Pablo Kuczynski announced a plan to legalize medical cannabis in Peru. The announcement followed a raid in Lima, in which police shut down an operation which produced cannabis medicines for 80 members whose children suffered from epilepsy and other ailments. Later that year, by a vote of 68 to 5, Peru's congress legalized cannabis oil for medical use.

In June 2021, Cannabis & Co. opened the first legal dispensary in Peru for the sale of medicinal marijuana after obtaining signed consent (permits) from the following four Peruvian government entities:

1. General Directorate of Medicines
2. Supplies and Drugs (Digemid)
3. Ministry of Health (Minsa)
4. Anti-Drug Directorate of the National Police

For the opening, Cannabis & Co. registered three Cannabis brands from three different countries; Futura Farms (Peru), Epifractan (Uruguay), and Cannabidiol Life (United States).
