= Cannabis in Austria =

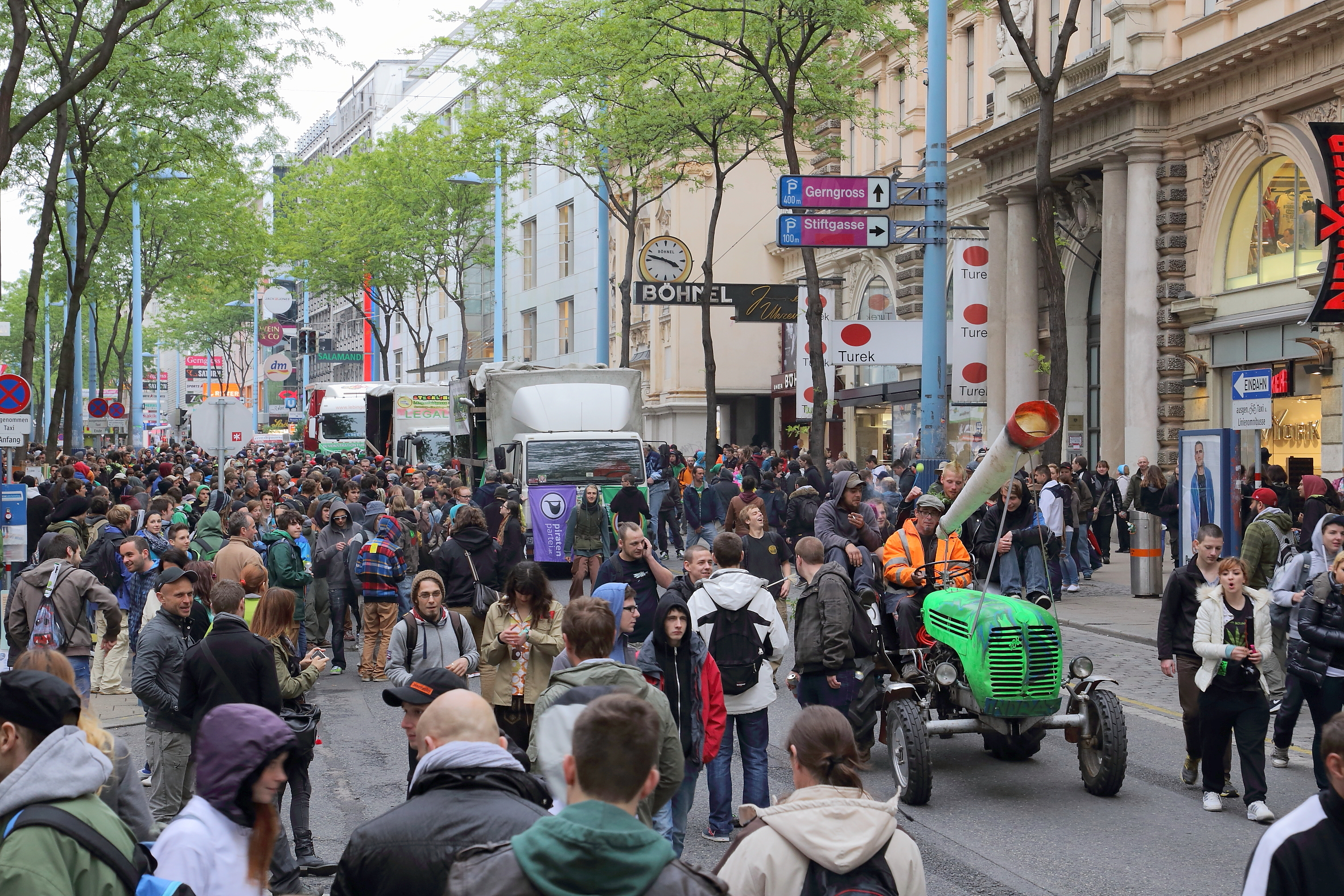
Hanfwandertag, Vienna, 2014

Cannabis in Austria is legal for scientific and limited medical usage, but illegal for recreational usage. Possession of small amounts for personal use was decriminalized in 2016. The sale of cannabis seeds and plants is legal as long as it's not used for drug-manufacturing and sale.

== Medical cannabis ==
On 9 July 2008, the Austrian Parliament approved cannabis cultivation for scientific and medical uses. Cannabis cultivation is controlled by the Austrian Agency for Health and Food Safety (Österreichische Agentur für Gesundheit und Ernährungssicherheit, AGES).

== Legal situation ==
Owning, the purchase, importation, exportation, transportation, or cultivation of cannabis is a punishable offense in Austria. Offenders face high fines or imprisonment up to 360 days. In 2016, the possession of small amounts (usually under 5 grams of cannabis flower) is considered as for personal consumption, whereas quantities over 5 grams are considered with the intent of selling. The possession of substances containing THC for personal consumption has been decriminalized tp the extent that anyone found in possession of small quantities will not be pursued if they have not been implicated in any drug-related offenses within the last five years .

Both Δ^{9}-THC and pharmaceutical preparations containing Δ^{9}-THC are listed in annex IV of the Austrian Narcotics Decree (Suchtgiftverordnung). Compendial formulations are manufactured upon prescription according to the German Neues Rezeptur-Formularium.

In 2022, the German government announced plans to legalize the regulated purchase and the recreational use of cannabis. Due to the common open border between Germany and Austria (32% of Austria’s entire border), and their close economic and cultural ties, a public discussion has been sparked in Austria regarding legalization and almost 50% of its population are open to legal cannabis.
