= Cannabis in Lithuania =

Cannabis in Lithuania is criminalized for both recreational and medical use. Lithuania criminalized cannabis in 2017 and is the only country in the world to have criminalized cannabis in the 21st century. Until 2013, Lithuania was the only country in the European Union where the cultivation of industrial hemp was banned.

== Medical cannabis ==
The use of cannabis for medical purposes is criminalized in Lithuania.

== Industrial hemp ==
In 2013, the Government of Lithuania decided to lift the ban on industrial hemp. Until 2013, Lithuania was the only country in the European Union that prohibited the cultivation of industrial hemp, and until 2021, hemp products containing any amount of THC were considered illegal. Since November 2021, the production and sale of hemp products have been allowed if the amount of THC in the products did not exceed 0.2 percent. THC limit was increased to 0.3 percent in 2022.

== Synthetic cannabinoids ==
A law allowing prescription drugs containing synthetic cannabinoids for medical use was approved by the Seimas on 11 October 2018, with an effective date of 1 May 2019. As of the effective date no such drugs were available in pharmacies, however.

== 420 protest ==
In 2016 protestors planning an April 20th event at Parliament were targeted by the Prosecutor General's Office, which believed that permitting the event might "violate the public interest".

== Politics ==
Lithuania's Freedom Party supports "the reduction of penalties for the possession of marijuana for personal use, and [has] a commitment to remove restrictions in general."
