= Cannabis in Chile =

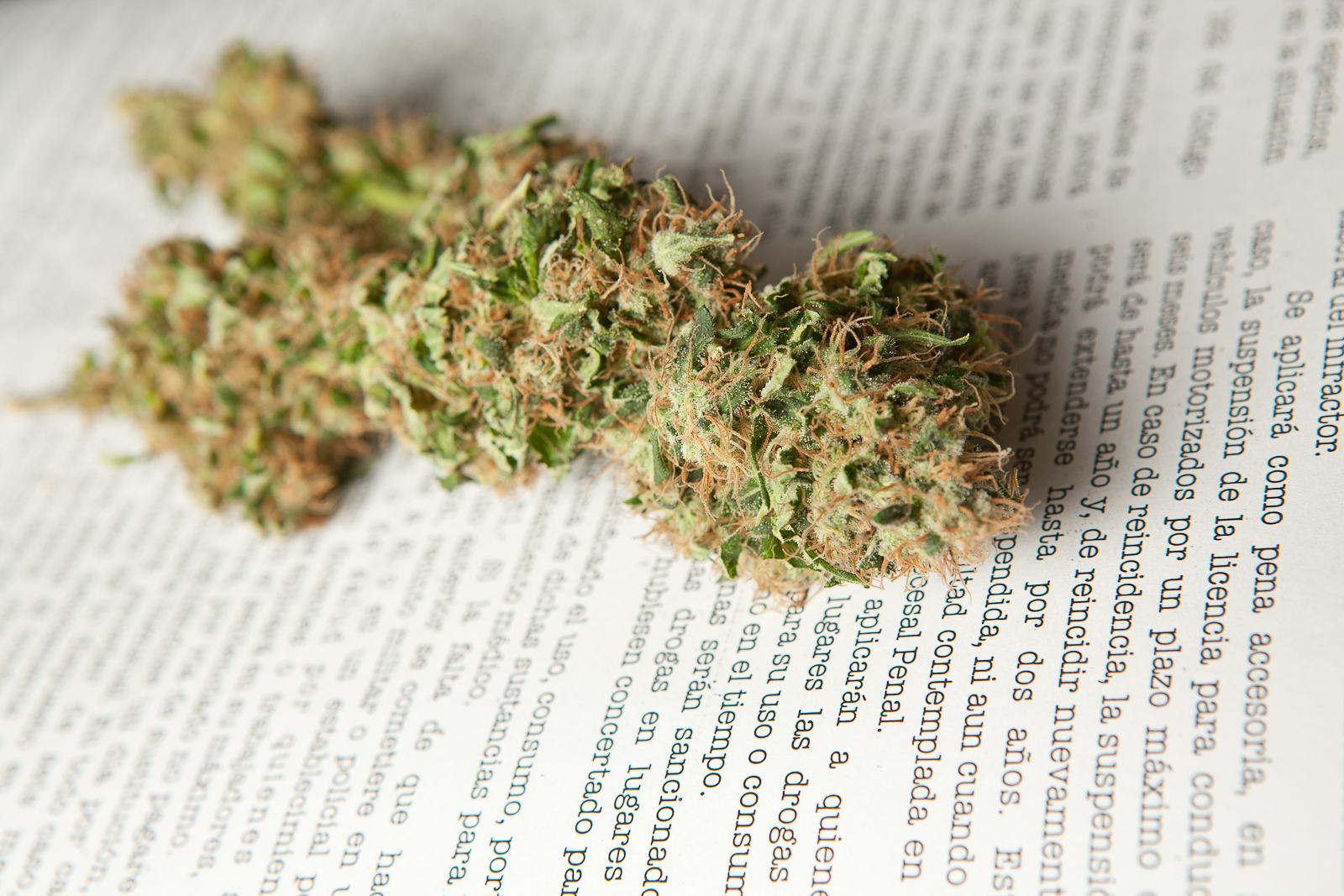
Cannabis atop a page of the Chilean Ley de drogas

Cannabis in Chile is illegal for all production and public consumption, though private at-home consumption, grow and selling is allowed for medical use. It is widely consumed, with the highest per-capita use in Latin America. In 2014 Chile began clinical trials on medical marijuana, and in 2015 a decriminalization bill successfully passed the lower house of the Chilean Congress.

== History ==
Cannabis has a long history in Chile, possibly the longest in the New World, as hemp production for fiber was introduced in the Quillota Valley as early as 1545, to support the army and shipping. Similar attempts were made in Peru, Colombia, and Mexico, but only in Chile did the crop find success.

In the 1940s, cannabis was used by American sailors in the brothels of the port towns of Antofagasta and Tocopilla. The expanding use of cannabis in Chile in the 1960-1970s was associated with its popularization by foreign sailors, and later by hippies arrived in Chile from the United States or other Latin American nations. By the early 1970s, a Ministry of Education report stated that 60% of Chilean high school students had tried cannabis.

== Terminology ==
According to the Dictionary of Chilean Slang, terms used for cannabis in Chile include: marihuana, papelillo, volarse, cogoyo, paraguayo, mota, macoña and yerba.

== Statistics ==
According to a study by the University of London and the Universidad Andrés Bello in 2017, 40% of Chileans had used cannabis and 48.2% of Chileans supported its legalization, the highest rates in the 9 South American countries included in the study. Only 6.2% believed there are serious risks associated with its use, which is less than any of the other countries included in the study.

Chile also has an earlier than average age of first cannabis usage, at age 12 compared to the global average of 14–15.

== Economy ==
While Chile has some local production, a large amount of its cannabis is imported from neighbors, particularly Paraguay and Peru.

== Legality ==
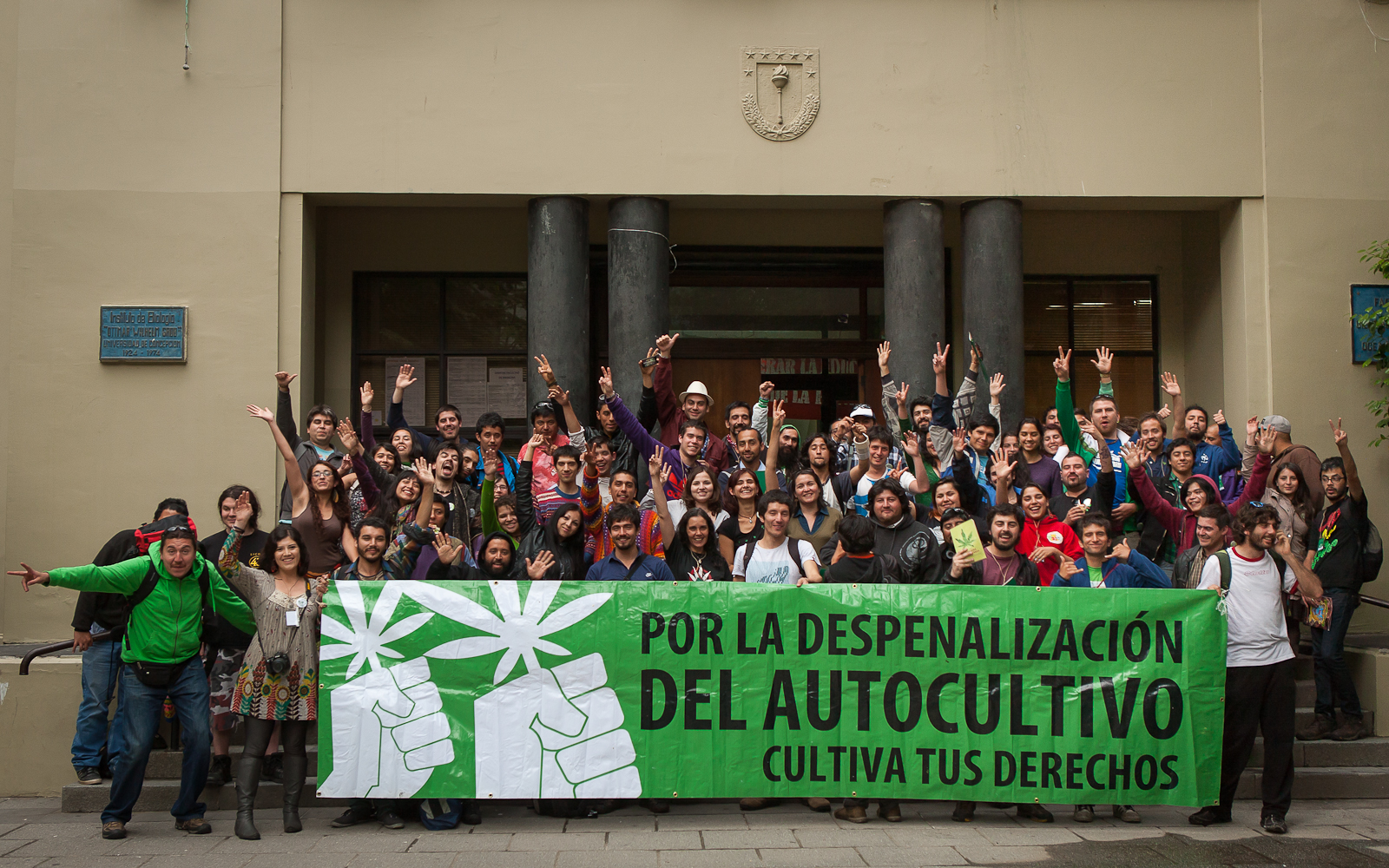
First National Cannabis Congress, Concepción, 2012; sign reads: for the decriminalization of self-cultivation cultivate your rights

The current overarching drug law of Chile is the 2005 Ley de drogas. Further, in 2008 Chile toughened its cannabis trafficking laws, with punishments equivalent to those for cocaine and heroin, in reaction to the increasing consumption and presence of imported Paraguayan cannabis. In 2012, Socialist Party senator Fulvio Rossi publicly admitted that he used cannabis, leading to some public outcry, while Rossi took the occasion to propose major changes to Chile's cannabis laws and policies.

Cannabis became an issue in the 2021 Chilean presidential election cycle, with multiple presidential candidates endorsing legalization. Daniel Jadue of the Communist Party and Paula Narváez of the Socialist Party, the presidential nominees of their respective parties, have both endorsed legalization.

=== Medical cannabis ===
In 2014, cultivators with government permission began planting cannabis in Chile, including a location in Santiago to produce oil for cancer patients.

=== Decriminalization ===
A Chilean organization holds annual protests each April 20, since 2005 in support legalization of cannabis.

In 2015, a bill allowing Chileans to grow up to six plants per home for "medical, recreational or spiritual reasons" passed the lower house of Congress, 68–39. The bill will head next to the Chilean Senate for vote.
