= Cannabis in Nepal =

- Location of Nepal (dark green)
- Medicinal: Legal
- Recreational: Illegal

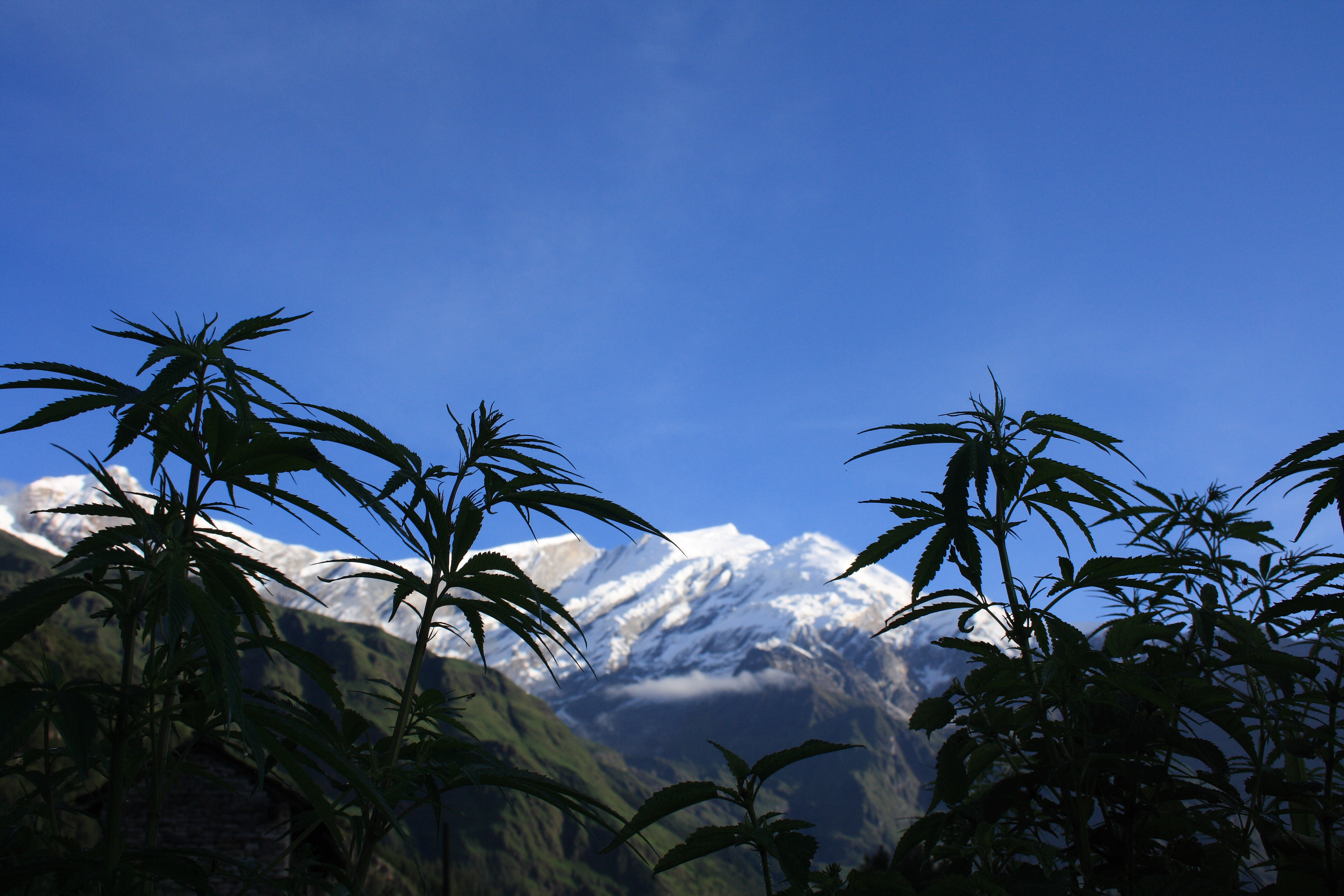
Cannabis plants in front of the Dhaulagiri summit

Cannabis has been illegal in Nepal since 1976, but the country has a long history of use of cannabis for Ayurvedic medicine, intoxicant and as a holy offering for Hindu god Shiva and continues to produce cannabis illicitly.

In May 2024, Finance Minister Barsaman Pun announced that medicinal marijuana would be legalised in Nepal.

== History ==
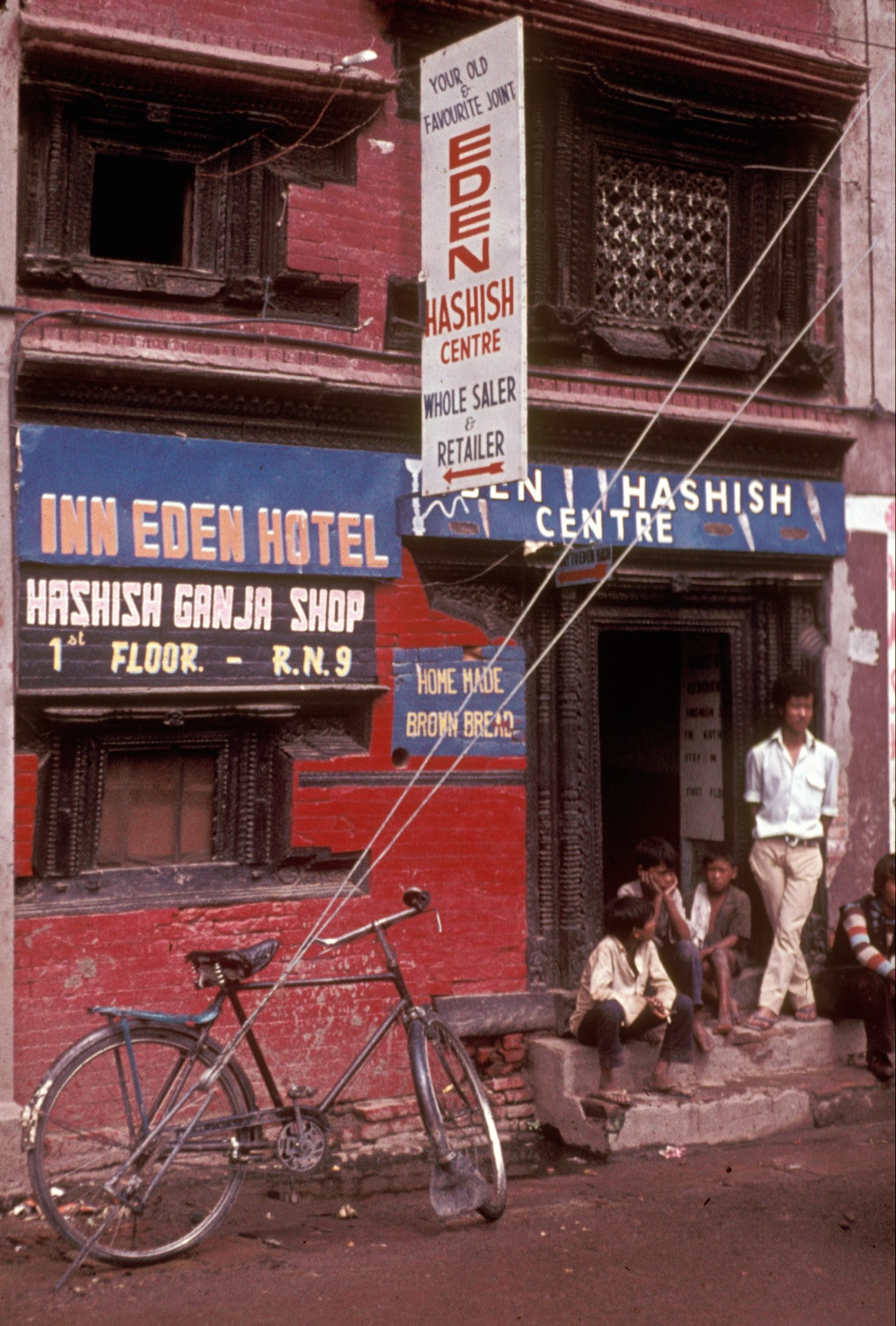
Legal cannabis shop in Kathmandu in 1973

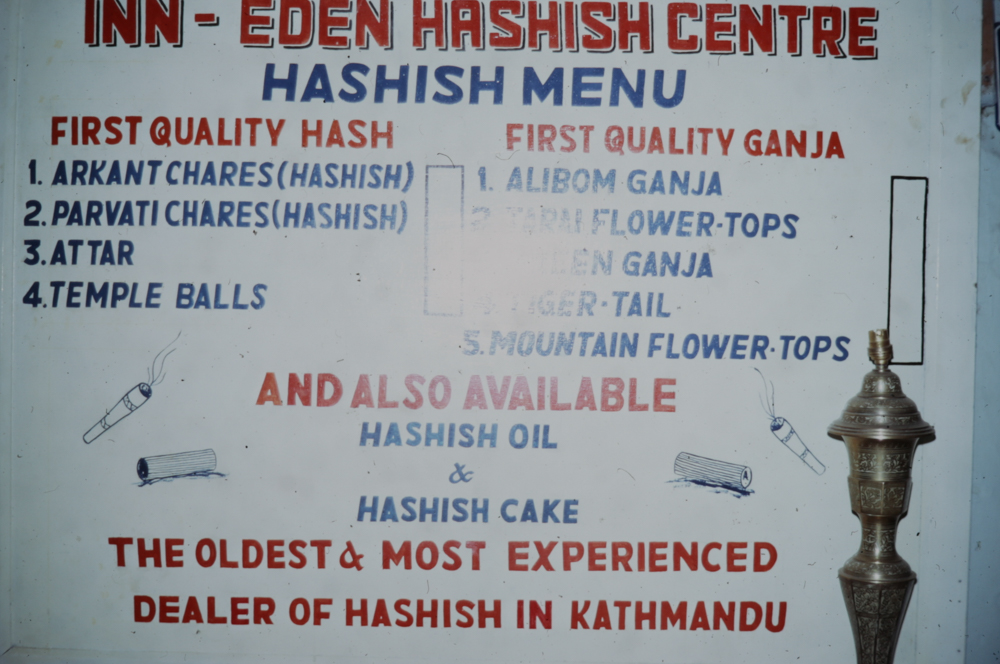
Menu in a Kathmandu Pot Shop, 1973

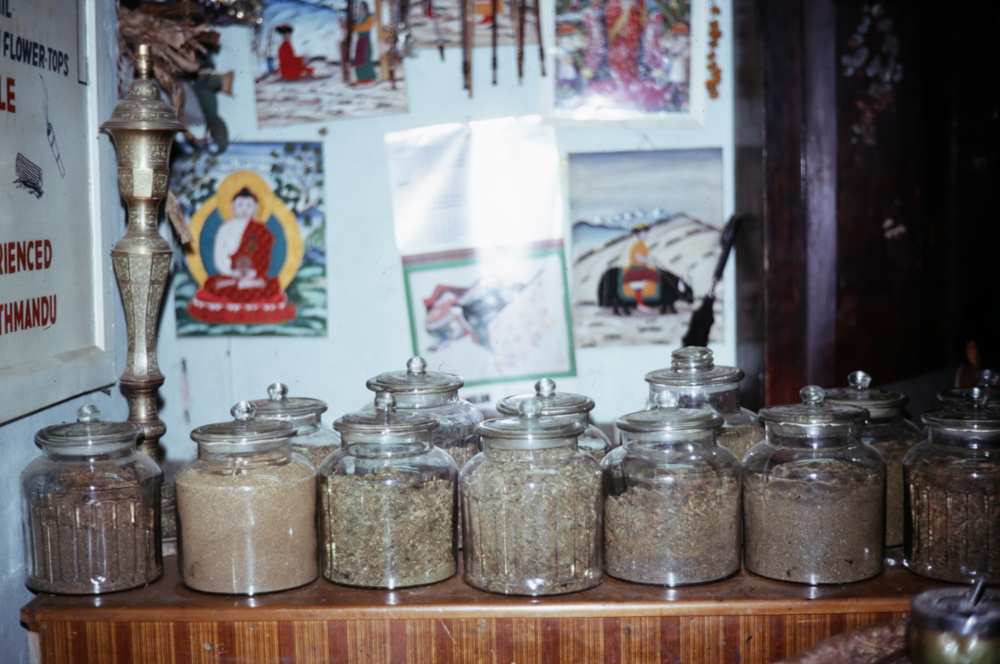
The drugs displayed in a Kathmandu hashish and marijuana store, 1973

Nepal has a centuries-old history of psychoactive cannabis use, with its reputation for high-quality cannabis resin, known locally as charas, dating back to at least the 1700s. Over time, the country became a popular destination for cannabis enthusiasts from around the world. By the 1960s and 1970s, Kathmandu's Freak Street had become a well-known gathering place for hippies and travelers, where cannabis products were openly sold by licensed vendors. Located near Basantapur Durbar Square, the street is still known today as Hippie Street, although much of its former charm has faded.

During this period, the cannabis trade supported various sectors of Nepalese society, benefiting the government, farmers, and business owners through cannabis cultivation, production, and sales.

In the early 1800s, commentator Francis Buchanan-Hamilton noted:

In Nepal, the Gangja, Charas, or Cannabis sativa, as mentioned, is a common weed: but in that country, it is not cultivated, although much used for intoxication.

=== The Hippie Trail ===
In the 1960s, the Hippie Trail began to route young Western adventurers through Nepal. The stable traditional cannabis economy was rocked by the influx of demand, and the heavy usage by visitors normalized and made cannabis consumption trendy locally. The increased demand and linkage to outside markets led to an increase in hashish production, and smuggling routes were established through India and the wider world.

=== Prohibition ===
In 1973, Nepal canceled the licenses of all cannabis shops, dealers, and farmers, under pressure from the United States and the international community. However, personal cultivation and use were unaffected, and cannabis commerce continued illicitly. The loss of $100,000 in government revenues caused disruption, and later in the 1970s, attempts were made at crop substitution.

== Law ==
Nepal enacts Narcotic Drugs (Control) Act, 2033 (1976) on 22 September 1976 prohibiting the cultivation, production, preparation, purchasing, selling, distributing, exporting or importing, conduct any trafficking, storage of, or consumption of cannabis. The Act classifies cannabis as narcotic drugs that includes (1) Any plant of cannabis/ marijuana genus including hemp and siddha and also includes the leaves and flowers thereof. (2) Natural resin, gum, and sap obtained from ... cannabis/ marijuana plants, and, (3) Any substance containing any of the extract, substance, essence, mixture, and beverage containing any of the substances mentioned above. However, the prohibition of the Act is not to be applied to the Government of Nepal or any institution working under the full and complete supervision and control of the Government of Nepal after obtaining a special license for cultivating, preparation, producing, manufacturing, exporting, or importing narcotic drugs for the purposes of medicine or scientific research or from selling narcotic drugs to any person on the recommendation of a recognized medical practitioner. The Government of Nepal may frame Rules regulating the production of hashish (chares) from wild cannabis/marijuana plants growing in the western hilly region of Nepal and the collection, storage, sale, and purchase of such hashish (chares) for a specified period. The government of Nepal may, if it deems necessary, for cannabis/ marijuana, for the purpose of preparing medicine, make available in the required quantity of cannabis/ marijuana out of the cannabis confiscated or seized under the Act to any agency which is engaged in the production of medicine.

== Cultivation ==
Cannabis can be found in the wild in all hilly areas of Nepal. There has been some report of illegal cultivation in the country.

== Usage ==
Cannabis is considered as the gift of Lord Shiva, and is considered as holy offering in the festival of Mahashivaratri. On the day of Mahashivaratri, officials historically tolerated cannabis use, but starting around 2018, police said they would arrest festival observers found smoking in public places during shivaratri.

== Legalization movement ==
Member of Parliament from the Communist Party, Birodh Khatiwada, and 47 other party lawmakers filed a motion in parliament in January 2020 calling for the legalization of Cannabis. Another legalization bill, supported by the national health minister, was introduced in 2021.

== See also ==
- Alcohol in Nepal
