= Cannabis in Sweden =

Legality of cannabis in Europe Legal for recreational use Legal for medical use Illegal

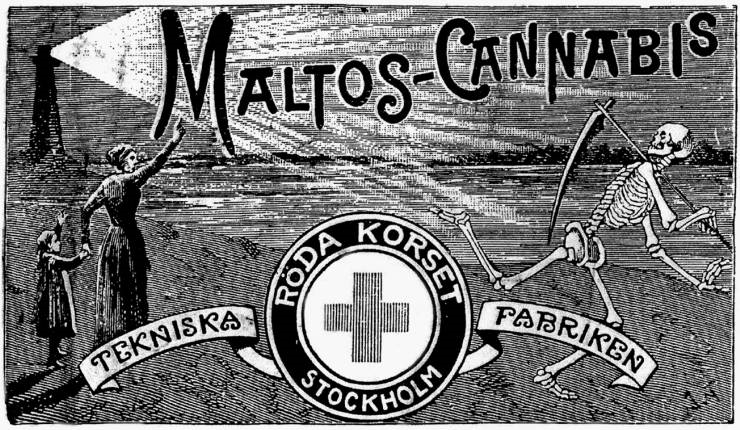
Advertisement for cannabis from the 1800s

Cannabis in Sweden is illegal for all purposes. It is illegal for recreational purposes, for most medical purposes and possession of even small amounts of cannabis is a criminal offence. Consequently, limited medical usage of cannabis-based drugs is only allowed for specific conditions.

== Attitudes ==
Swedish singer Ängie has spoken about the attitudes towards cannabis in Sweden. In an interview in September 2016 she said, "In Sweden, it's not ok to smoke weed [cannabis]. They're like, 'it's a dangerous drug and you're going to die.' It's so weird. If I tell a regular boy or girl that I use it, they think I'm a real hard drug user because they don't know the facts behind it. It's just sad… I hate the law book here."

== Medical cannabis ==
In Sweden, cannabis has no officially recognized medical use and medical use is not considered an extenuating circumstance. A case was covered by the national press which involved the cannabis use of a multiple sclerosis patient. In the case, the court found that the fact that she stated that cannabis helped her symptoms constituted an aggravated circumstance. The court's verdict argued that she lacked the motivation to stop using the drug and therefore gave her an unconditional jail sentence. This was despite the fact that the patient was a first-time offender, and would have normally been given a suspended sentence or a fine.

In 2008, the Medical Products Agency reported that no drugs containing cannabinoids are available, although they can have beneficial effects on symptoms like neuralgia. The cannabinoid mouth spray Sativex, which is derived from cannabis, was approved in Sweden for the treatment of spasticity as a symptom of multiple sclerosis on 22 December 2011.

To obtain a prescription, more definitive proof must be provided that traditional treatments failed. Between 2016 and 2018, the number of medical licenses for cannabis products not currently approved climbed from only 8 to 63, showing that acceptance, however slow, is on the rise.

In 2018, the medical use of cannabis for situations in which conventional treatment is no longer available was being examined by the European Court of Human Rights.

== Reform ==
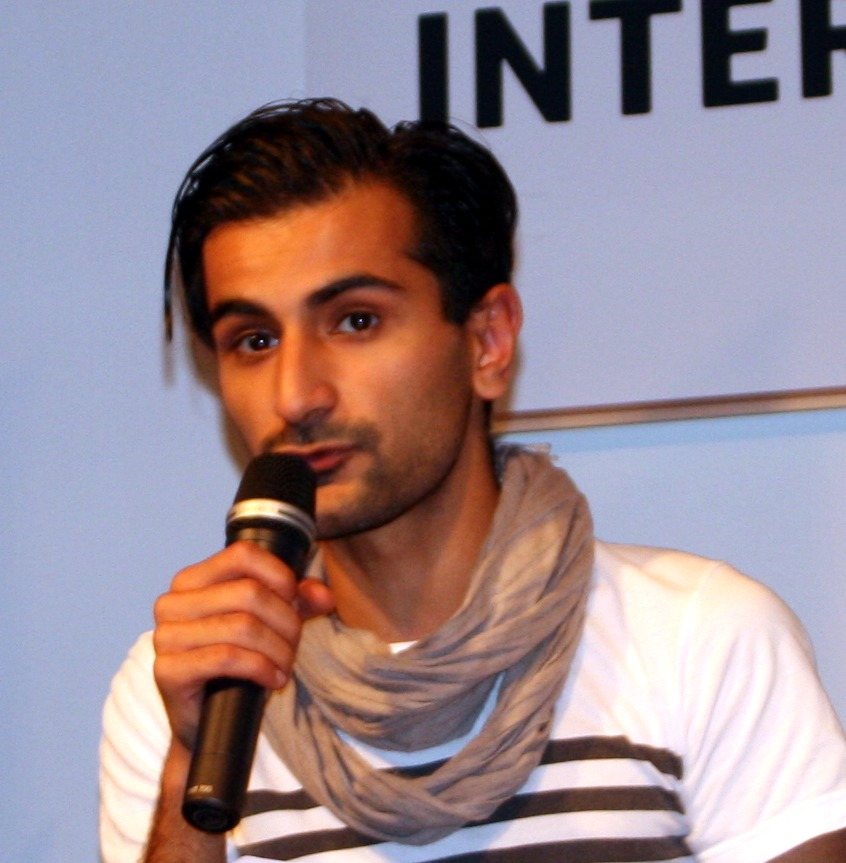
Hanif Bali

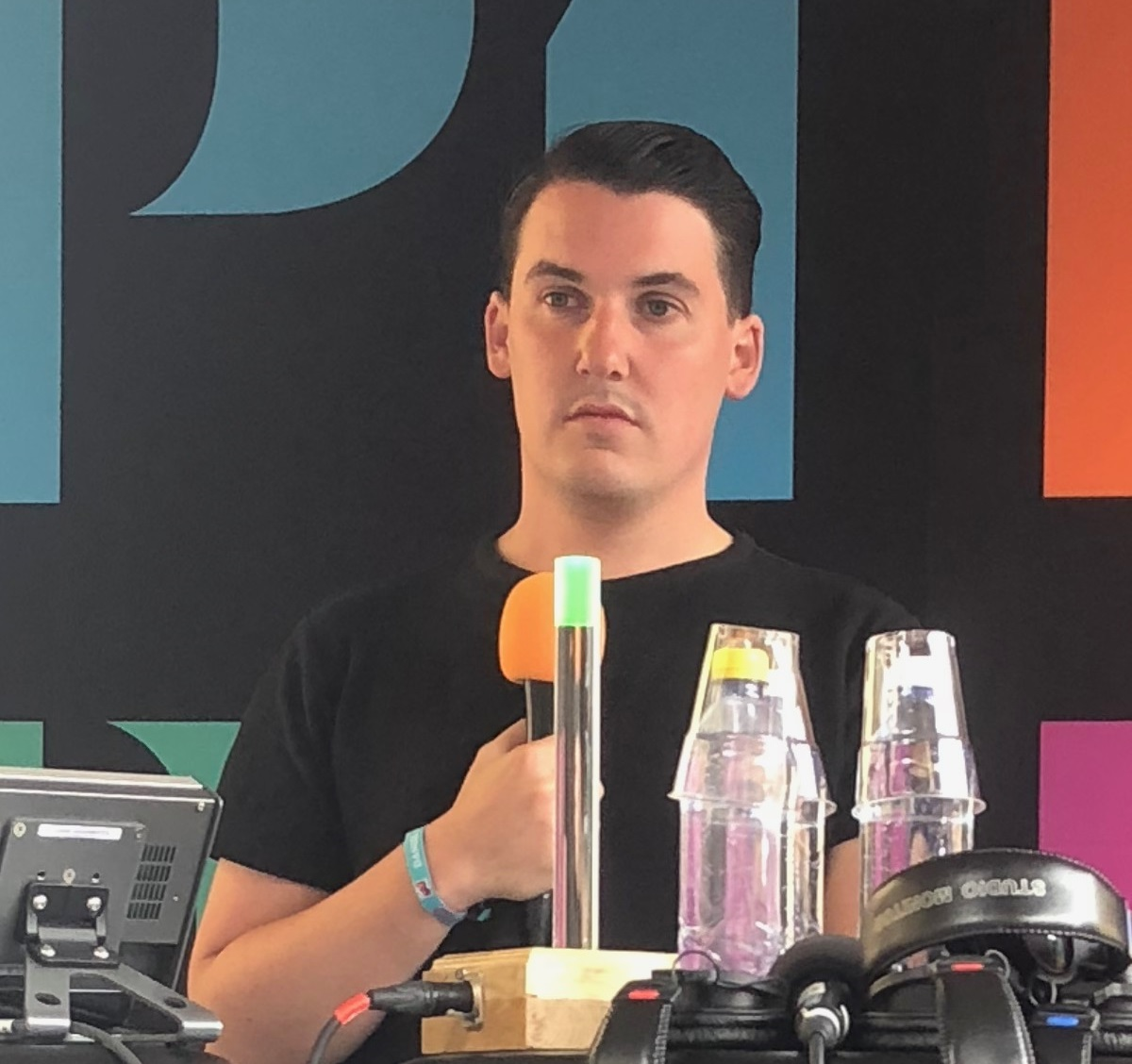
Joar Forssel

Some members of the Swedish Parliament, have voiced support for reforming the legal status of cannabis. During the legislature's question time on 11 January 2012, former Sweden Democrat MP William Petzäll asked Minister of Health and Social Affairs Maria Larsson if she would support the legalization of cannabis. Larsson responded in the negative on 2 February of the same year. Moderate MP Hanif Bali has also supported the legalization of cannabis to fight drug traffickers and organized crime. Liberal MP Joar Forssell is a cannabis rights activist and a strong critic of Sweden's zero-tolerance policy on drugs. The former leader of the Liberals, Nyamko Sabuni, has expressed support for the legalization of medicinal cannabis but does not support legalization for recreational use, proposing instead that "we should work more to ensure that addicts get the care they need".

In 2013, Centre Party Youth (CUF) announced their advocacy for the legalization of cannabis. Among their justifications are the idea that the ban leads to greater harm than the drug itself, that prohibition favors organized crime, and that possession and controlled sale of alcohol is already legal. The Moderate Youth League and the Liberal Youth of Sweden together with CUF all support the legalization of cannabis. Young Left and the Young Greens both support the decriminalization of the drug. The Swedish Social Democratic Youth League support investigation into the potential legalization of cannabis, while the Young Swedes SDU and the Young Christian Democrats oppose legalization of any kind.

As part of the Pirate Party's 2022 election manifesto it stated its support for legalising cannabis in Sweden and creating a regulated market for it. It stated this would use state monopolies or licenses in a similar way to how alcohol and tobacco is regulated in the country. The party said this would "deprive criminal organisations of income from drug sales and free up police resources that instead could be used to fight crimes with human victims."

THCA was prohibited in Sweden on 14 July, 2026. The substance has been mentioned in 11 calls to the Swedish Poison Information Centre between 2024 and 2026. Intake from vaporizers, powder and baked goods was reported and vapes were most common in the calls. According to the Public Health Agency's submission to the government, abuse occurs and may increase in Sweden.

== Cannabis legalization around the world ==
As of 2021 over 30 countries have legalized marijuana for medical use and some have also legalized it for recreational use, such as Canada and some states in the United States.

== Cannabis culture ==
=== Regional slang names for cannabis ===
Flower/fruit

- Grälle
- Gräs
- Gröning
- Grönt
- Marre
- Maja
- Ört
- Äzi
- Jazztobak
- Hash
- Böj
- Braj
- Brass
- Brownie
- Brunt
- Knatch, knätch
- Svart
- Zattla
- Zütt
