= Cannabis in Poland =

Legality of cannabis in Europe Legal for recreational use Legal for medical use Illegal

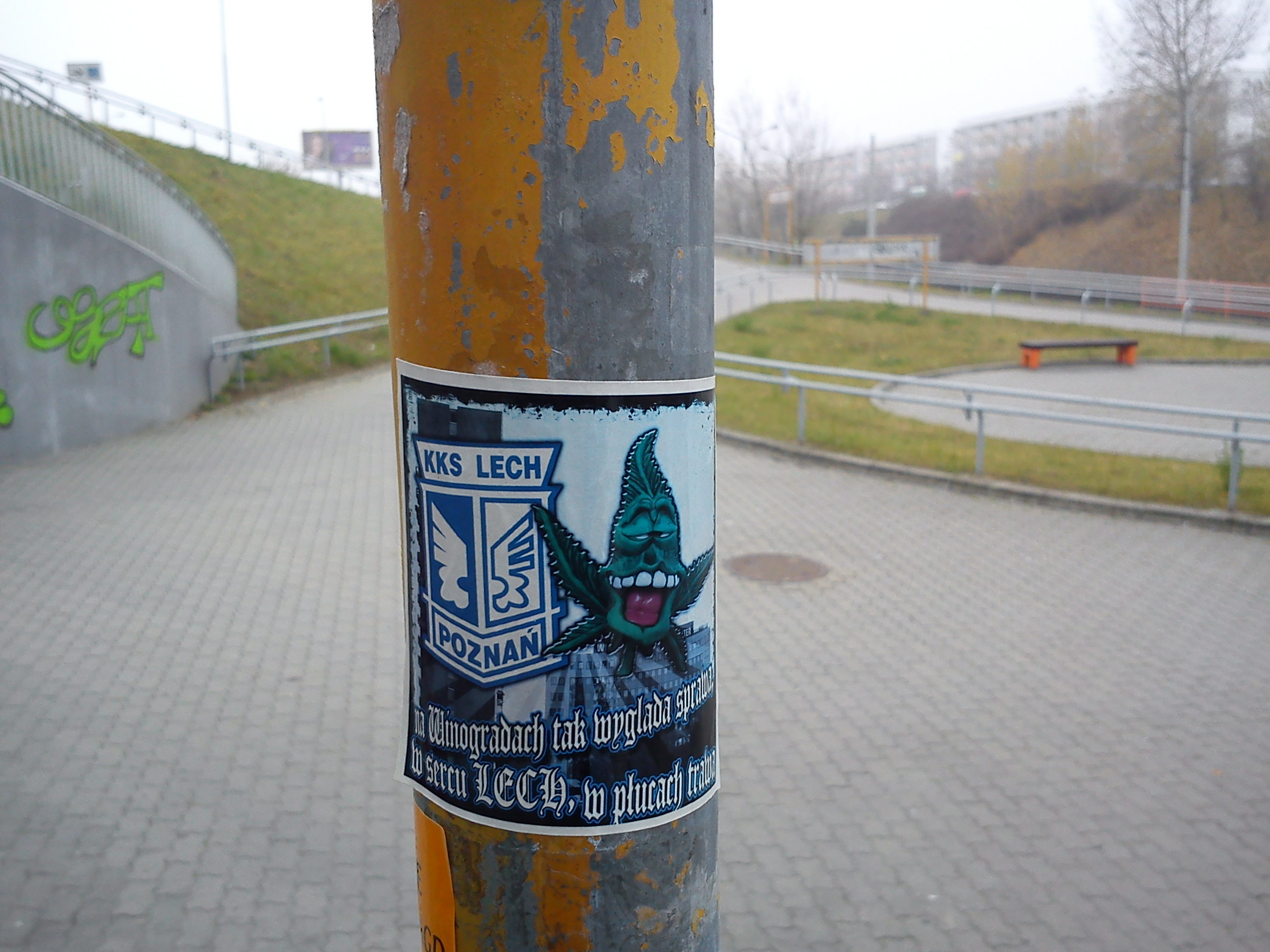
Sticker art in Poznań, created by Lech Poznań fans

Possession of most drugs for recreational use, including cannabis, is illegal in Poland. It was classified as a narcotic in 1951, but it was not until 1997 that possession and use of the drug became a crime. Since 2011, prosecutors have the discretion to drop charges if the quantity of drugs seized is minimal. The medical use of cannabis was legalized in 2018.

== History ==
Like in most countries, cannabis spread to Poland naturally, several thousand years ago. It has been cultivated for most of the last millennium. Similarly, until the early 20th century it was a legal substance, used in medicine and recreation.

=== Criminalization ===
The Second Polish Republic was one of the signatories to the Second International Opium Convention held in 1925, which entered into force in 1928, which imposed some restrictions on the trade and production of cannabis and related goods. Cannabis was first explicitly mentioned in Polish legislation of 1930, and classified as harmful to health. The People's Republic of Poland's legislation of 1951 classified cannabis as a narcotic, and successive legislation made production and dealing in it illegal; however possession and use were not a crime until 1997. The Polish legislation of 1997 was the first that criminalized possession of narcotics, including cannabis.

=== Partial decriminalization ===
Since 2011 prosecutors may decide not to prosecute if amount of seized drugs is small and they were possessed with intent for personal use.

On 26 May 2011, Poland introduced legislation that would give prosecutors the option to not prosecute for possession of small quantities of cannabis for personal use, if it is a first offence, or if the person is drug dependent. The legislation raised the maximum possible penalty for dealing a large quantity of drugs from 10 to 12 years in prison, and the penalty for possession of large quantities of drugs would result in up to 10 years in prison (previously up to 8 years).

In the 2010s following a growing movement in support of legalizing cannabis for medical use, Poland has moved towards decriminalizing cannabis, with governments discussing several legislation variants, including one proposed by the Kukiz'15 party, and other forms of support from parties such as Twój Ruch. Legalization of cannabis has been publicly supported by Polish politicians such as Janusz Palikot, Ryszard Kalisz and Janusz Korwin Mikke, and public figures (journalists, artists, scientists) such as Piotr Bikont, Andrzej Chyra, Magdalena Cielecka, Agnieszka Holland, Zbigniew Hołdys, Krzysztof Krauze, Mikołaj Lizut, Robert Makłowicz, Tomasz Sikora, Jerzy Pilch, Stanisław Soyka and Jerzy Vetulani. The legalisation of cannabis is also supported by The Left.

=== Legalization of medical cannabis ===
Poland legalized the medical use of cannabis in July 2018 (Piotr Liroy-Marzec bill). The law went into effect in November 2018.

== Use ==
According to 2013 data, 17.3% adults in Poland had used cannabis at least once in their lifetime, and 17.1% of young adults used it at least once in the past year. There were signs that cannabis use is becoming popular. There are constant efforts made by some of more liberal politicians in pursue of recreational legalisation, spawning vocal activism and votings among the public.
