= Cannabis in Estonia =

Legality of cannabis in Europe Legal for recreational use Legal for medical use Illegal

Cannabis in Estonia is illegal, but possession of up to 7.5 grams is considered an amount for personal use, and is punished with a fine. Large amounts and distribution are criminal offences and punishable with a custodial sentence of up to 5 years.

The age limit for buying CBD cannabis is 18 years and a prescription is not needed. The age limit for using CBD products for self-medication is 16; patients younger than 16 need a medical prescription. In 2018, the then recently merged municipality of Kanepi in southern Estonia adopted the cannabis leaf as the symbol on its flag and coat of arms. Kanep is the Estonian word for cannabis. Hemp was historically used as a product in shipbuilding. It was traded from the eastern Baltic within the Hanseatic League and in the sixteenth century directly to the Netherlands for this purpose.
