= Cannabis in Croatia =

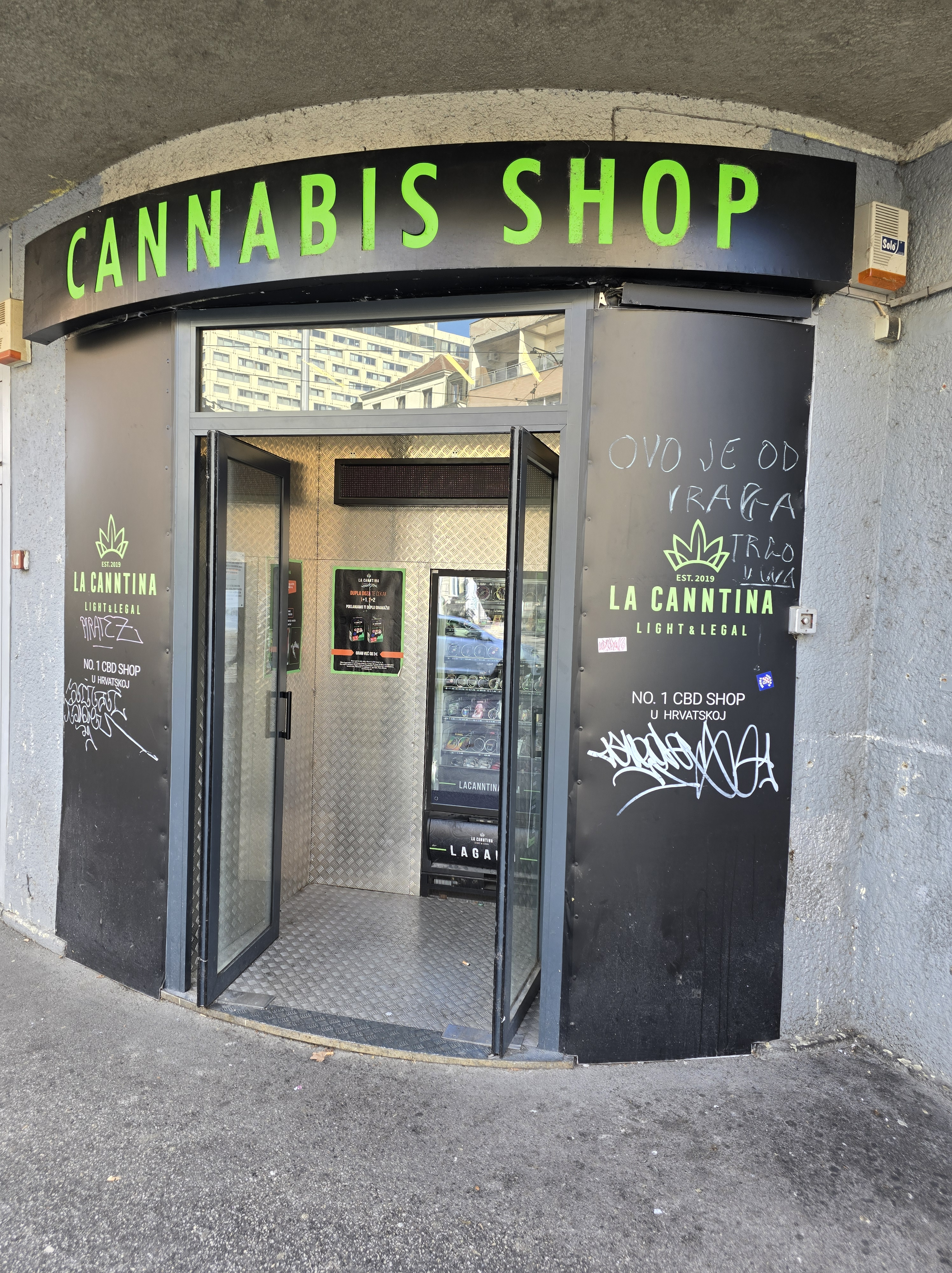
Cannabis shop in Zagreb

Legality of cannabis in Europe Legal for recreational use Legal for medical use Illegal

The use of Cannabis in Croatia is decriminalized for personal use and legalized for limited medical uses.

== Decriminalization ==
From 2013, there is a distinction in the Croatian penal code between various illegal substances, they are now separated on heavy drugs and light drugs like cannabis. According to the law, growing or selling cannabis is considered a felony punishable by a mandatory prison sentence (three years minimum). From 2013, the possession of small amount of marijuana and other light drugs is a minor offence which leads to a fine of 5000–20000kn (US$750–3000) depending on the case in question.

== Legalization ==
The political party Human Shield support the full legalization of cannabis in Croatia.

== Medical cannabis ==
As of 15 October 2015, the Ministry of Health officially legalized the use of cannabis-based drugs for medical purposes for patients with illnesses such as cancer, multiple sclerosis, or AIDS. From April 2025 companies can legally produce medical cannabis which will bring down the costs of cannabis and reduce the usage of black market cannabis for medical reasons.
