= Cannabis in Ukraine =

Legality of cannabis in Europe Legal for medical and recreational use Legal for medical use only Illegal

Cannabis in Ukraine is legal for both medical and industrial purposes, as well as for scientific and scientific-technical activities.

== History ==
The Ukrainian Soviet Socialist Republic was one of the biggest producers of hemp, and before the 1950s, it had over 150,000 hectares dedicated to hemp cultivation. Cannabis was not widely used as a recreational drug in Soviet Ukraine, most of the grown hemp would be used for its other natural resources such as oil and fiber.

== Enforcement ==
According to Article 106-2 Code of Administrative Offences Ukraine, cultivation (without intent to sell) up to 10 cannabis plants qualifies as an administrative violation, with a fine of from 18 to 100 non-taxable income units (₴300-1,700 in 2011) and the seizure of plants.

The limit for possession without intent to sell, for which no criminal liability is given, is up to 5 grams of cannabis. However, there are plans to raise this limit to 10 grams.

== Reform ==
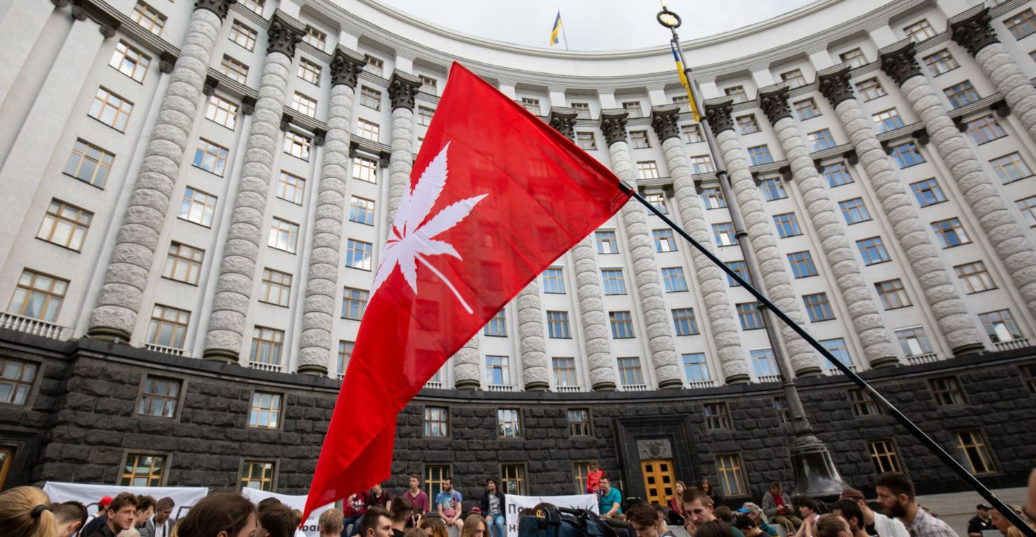
The 2019 March for legalisation taking place in front of the Ukrainian government building

=== Cannabis March of Freedom (2017) ===
A march was planned for 28 October 2017, taking place near the Government of Ukraine.

=== 2019 petition ===
On 30 January 2019, the Ukrainian Association of Medical Cannabis created a petition with the backing of 16 public organizations on the Verkhovna Rada (Ukrainian parliament) website. The petition said that medical cannabis could greatly help over two million Ukrainians suffering from a wide range of ailments, including epilepsy, cancer and post-traumatic stress disorder. Acting Health Minister Ulana Suprun supported petition and called for the promotion of legalization medical cannabis.

In March, the petition received the required 25,000 signatures for consideration by the Verkhovna Rada. Subsequently, the Verkhovna Rada Committee on Human Rights, National Minorities and Interethnic Relations unanimously supported the petition and it was registered in the Verkhovna Rada on 20 May.

The legalization of medical cannabis was supported by the President of Ukraine Volodymyr Zelenskyy in an interview to RBC-Ukraine on 18 April 2019.

=== 2020 survey ===
On 25 October 2020, Zelenskyy announced a non-binding national survey. The fourth question was: "Do you support the legalization of cannabis for medical purposes – to reduce pain in critically ill patients?" Former Minister of Health Ulana Suprun wrote on her official Facebook page that "Cannabis should be available to all patients who need it. There are about 2 million such patients in Ukraine." 64.88% of the participants responded positively, with 29.53% voicing their opposition.

=== "Let Ukraine Grow" campaign ===
Public activists with the participation of the non-governmental organization "Ukrainian Hemp Association" and employees of many shops related to the cannabis industry in April 2023 began to assemble a team to hold a peaceful action to stop the stigmatization of cannabis and to encourage public support for its decriminalization. On 20 April 2023, the activists started a campaign including free distribution of hemp seeds to everyone. The campaign was supported by large seed shops in Ukraine, such as ErrorSeeds. As part of the effort, decriminalization activists sowed cannabis seeds throughout Ukraine, particularly in public places. Their effort was primarily focused on the legalization of medical cannabis, but also recreational cannabis.

=== Medical legalisation (2021–2024) ===
In April 2021, some THC- and CBD-containing drugs were approved for medical use (namely Dronabinol and Nabiximols).

On 7 July 2023, The Ministry of Health of Ukraine supported the legalisation of cannabis-based medicines, which was advocated by Zelenskyy and deputy head of the department, chief state sanitary doctor Ihor Kuzin.

On 13 July 2023, the Verkhovna Rada voted on a bill to legalize medical cannabis in the first reading, with 268 votes in favor.

On 21 December 2023, the Parliament adopted the bill on medical cannabis #7457 in the second reading. The bill provides:

- The bill regulates the circulation of cannabis in medical, industrial and scientific activities. The bill provides that the distribution of marijuana for recreational consumption will be considered a crime.
- The production of cannabis-based medicines is controlled at all stages. It can be grown only by legal entities that will receive a license and a GMP certificate, under 24-hour video surveillance with access for the National Police of Ukraine;
- The bill provides for expanded patient access to medical cannabis-based medications and eases therapy for certain diseases and conditions. The Ministry of Health of Ukraine approves the list of diseases and conditions for which a patient can be prescribed medicines based on medical cannabis;
- Medicinal products based on medical cannabis can only be dispensed by a medical prescription in accordance with medical indications and by electronic prescription. Patients will be able to carry and store such drugs in the amount determined by a single medical prescription.

The condition under which such cultivation is allowed is the use of seeds collected from plant varieties, in the dried straw of which the maximum permissible content of tetrahydrocannabinol concentration does not exceed 0.2%. From February 16, 2027, the maximum permissible concentration of tetrahydrocannabinol in dried hemp straw for industrial purposes must not exceed 0.3%.

President Zelenskyy signed the bill into law on 13 February 2024.

On 16 August 2024, the law legalizing the use of medical cannabis in Ukraine officially came into effect.
