= Cannabis by country =

List of country-specific articles on cannabis.

== Africa ==
- Algeria
- Angola
- Benin
- Botswana
- Burkina Faso
- Burundi
- Cameroon
- Cape Verde
- Central African Republic
- Chad
- Comoros
- Democratic Republic of the Congo
- Republic of the Congo
- Djibouti
- Egypt
- Equatorial Guinea
- Eritrea
- Eswatini (Swaziland)
- Ethiopia
- Gabon
- Gambia
- Ghana
- Ivory Coast
- Kenya
- Lesotho
- Liberia
- Malawi
- Mali
- Mauritania
- Mauritius
- Madagascar
- Morocco
- Mozambique
- Namibia
- Nigeria
- Rwanda
- São Tomé and Principe
- Senegal
- Seychelles
- Sierra Leone
- Somalia
- South Africa
- Sudan
- Tanzania
- Togo
- Tunisia
- Uganda
- Zambia
- Zimbabwe

== America and Caribbean ==
=== Caribbean ===
- Antigua and Barbuda
- Bahamas
- Barbados
- Cuba
- Dominica
- Dominican Republic
- Grenada
- Haiti
- Jamaica
- Saint Kitts and Nevis
- Saint Lucia
- Saint Vincent and the Grenadines
- Trinidad and Tobago

=== Central and North America ===
- Belize
- Costa Rica
- El Salvador
- Guatemala
- Honduras
- Mexico
- Panama
- Canada
  - Legal history
  - Legality by jurisdiction
- United States
  - Legal history
  - Timeline
  - Medical
  - Non-medical
  - Legality by jurisdiction

=== South America ===
- Argentina
- Bolivia
- Brazil
- Chile
- Colombia
- Ecuador
- Guyana
- Paraguay
- Peru
- Suriname
- Uruguay
- Venezuela

== Antarctica ==
- Antarctica

== Asia ==
- Afghanistan
- Bahrain
- Bangladesh
- Bhutan
- Brunei
- Cambodia
- China
  - Hong Kong
  - Macau
- India
- Indonesia
- Iran
- Iraq
- Israel
- Japan
- Jordan
- Kazakhstan
- North Korea
- South Korea
- Kuwait
- Kyrgyzstan
- Laos
- Lebanon
- Malaysia
- Maldives
- Mongolia
- Myanmar
- Nepal
- Oman
- Pakistan
- Philippines
- Qatar
- Saudi Arabia
- Singapore
- Sri Lanka
- Syria
- Taiwan
- Tajikistan
- Thailand
- Timor-Leste
- Turkey
- Turkmenistan
- United Arab Emirates
- Uzbekistan
- Vietnam
- Yemen

== Europe ==
- Albania
- Andorra
- Austria
- Armenia
- Azerbaijan
- Belarus
- Belgium
- Bosnia and Herzegovina
- Bulgaria
- Croatia
- Cyprus
- Czech Republic
- Denmark
  - Greenland
- Estonia
- Finland
- France
  - Guadeloupe
  - French Guiana
  - Martinique
  - New Caledonia
  - Réunion
- Georgia
- Germany
- Greece
- Hungary
- Iceland
- Ireland
- Italy
  - History
- Kosovo
- Latvia
- Liechtenstein
- Lithuania
- Luxembourg
- Malta
- Moldova
- Monaco
- Montenegro
- Netherlands
- North Macedonia
- Norway
  - Svalbard
- Poland
- Portugal
- Romania
- Russia
- San Marino
- Serbia
- Slovakia
- Slovenia
- Spain
- Sweden
- Switzerland
- Turkey
- Ukraine
- United Kingdom
  - Bermuda
  - Cayman Islands
  - Gibraltar
  - Montserrat

== Oceania ==
- Australia
- Fiji
- Kiribati
- Marshall Islands
- Micronesia
- New Zealand
- Cook Islands
- Palau
- Papua New Guinea
- Samoa
- Solomon Islands
- Tonga
- Tuvalu
- Vanuatu

== See also ==
- Legality of cannabis
- Annual cannabis use by country
- Adult lifetime cannabis use by country
- Cannabis political parties
- Timeline of cannabis law
