= Cannabis in Ivory Coast =

Cannabis law and cultivation in Ivory Coast

Cannabis in Ivory Coast is illegal. The country produces some amount of low-grade cannabis for local and regional consumption.

== Cultivation ==
Cannabis cultivation increased substantially in Ivory Coast following a "cocoa crisis" in 1989–1990, which disrupted prices for one of the country's largest exports. The same profit produced on 30 hectares of cocoa can be gained on 0.1 hectares of cannabis.

== See also ==
- Opioid addiction in Ivory Coast
