= Cannabis in Liberia =

Cannabis in Liberia is illegal.

== History ==
During the First Liberian Civil War, Charles Taylor raised funds for his fighters by selling cannabis from territories under National Patriotic Front of Liberia control.

== See also ==
- Opioid addiction in Liberia
