= Cannabis in Montenegro =

Cannabis in Montenegro is illegal. The country serves as a conduit for Albanian cannabis being transported to Western Europe.
