= Cannabis in Turkmenistan =

- Location of Turkmenistan (red)
- Medicinal: Illegal
- Recreational: Illegal

Cannabis is illegal in Turkmenistan under a zero-tolerance drug policy outlined by the Criminal Code of Turkmenistan.

Cannabis was grown in the region for hemp oil until the 1870s, even though by that point it had been supplanted for fiber uses by Russian hemp. The Turkmen people grew cannabis indica, with male plants being used for fiber and females for seeds and bhang.
