= Cannabis in Fiji =

- Location of Fiji (dark green)
- Medicinal: Illegal
- Recreational: Illegal
- Hemp: Legal

Both the possession and consumption of cannabis, also known as saba (pronounced [ˈsam.ba]) in Fijian, are currently illegal in Fiji, if charged, the minimum prison sentencing is three months.

== History ==
Cannabis ("Indian hemp") was likely introduced to Fiji following the 1879 introduction of Indian workers under the Indentured Labour System.

A 1907 legal journal notes the existence of:

"Ordinance No. 21" which prohibited the "importation of Indian hemp, or any product or preparation therefrom, including gunjah, bhang, chavas, or any article which in the opinion of the Chief Medical Officer of the Colony is capable of substitution therefor.

A 1993 report noted that Fiji faced an "incipient" cannabis problem as youths were exposed to the drug by foreign travelers.

== Cultivation ==
Along with Papua New Guinea, Fiji is one of the main producers of cannabis in Oceania.

== Legality of hemp ==
As of July 2022, hemp became legal in Fiji in an attempt to cultivate the beginning of industrialised use within the country due to its diversified and practical uses. All hemp imported, grown or used for this newly established business must not contain more than a 1% concentration of [tetrahydrocannabinol], the primary component for the psychoactive properties found in cannabis cultivated for recreational use.
