= Cannabis in Ghana =

- Location of Ghana (dark green)
- Medicinal: Legal
- Recreational: Illegal

Cannabis in Ghana is illegal without license from the Minister of Health, but the nation is, along with Nigeria, among the top illicit cannabis-producing countries of West Africa. Cannabis in Ghana is known as weed or devil's tobacco (obonsam tawa) Ghana is also home to indigenous strains like Gh gold, Amnesia, Gringo amongst others.

== History ==
There are two main theories as to how cannabis came to Ghana:

- Brought there by troops returning from India and Burma after World War II
- Spread by sailors coming down the coast, most likely from Sierra Leone

The first report of illegal cannabis cultivation in Ghana occurred in 1960.

In July 2023, the first relaxations of hemp policy in Ghana became apparent. The government announced its intention to permit both industrial and medical usage in the future. Ghana is one of the first countries in Africa to follow the global trend of hemp liberalization. Additionally, voices advocating for swift further liberalization are growing louder, emphasizing the benefits and additional revenue from tourism.

== Culture ==
Cannabis remains the most popular illegal drug in Ghana. Ghana is reported as the highest cannabis-using nation in Africa, and third in the world.

In the 1990s, cannabis which had previously been an urban phenomenon in bars and nightclubs, had spread to rural areas as well. Cannabis was associated with youth involved in Rastafari culture, and with students who believed cannabis use would improve their ability to study.

== Economy ==
Cannabis from Ghana is transported to other countries in western Africa, as well as to Europe.

== See also ==
- Opioid addiction in Ghana
