= Cannabis in Ethiopia =

Cannabis in Ethiopia is illegal, and possession of cannabis can result in up to 6 months' imprisonment.

== History ==
Smoking pipes uncovered in Ethiopia and carbon-dated to around 1320 CE were found to have traces of cannabis.

== Shashamane ==
In the 1960s, Rastafari immigrants from the Caribbean began to settle on land near Shashamane which had been set aside for them by Emperor Haile Selassie I. Subsequently, Shashamane has become known for its cannabis cultivation, largely meant for local consumption.
