= Cannabis in Namibia =

Cannabis in Namibia is illegal for recreational and medicinal uses, but is the most popular illicit drug in the country. Cannabis also has a history of use as a traditional medicine by local indigenous communities. Per the 2011 UNODC report, the incidence of annual cannabis usage in Namibia was 3.9% as of 2000.

== Terminology ==
The term dagga or dakha ("grass") is common for cannabis, with a cannabis cigarette termed a zol or joint.

== Laws and policies ==
The criminalization of cannabis in Namibia is rooted in outdated, colonial - era laws that persist despite growing global recognition of its medical, economic, and social benefits. Human rights advocates challenge these prohibitions in efforts to expose their discriminatory enforcement and the harm they inflict on ordinary citizens. The fight for legalization is not just about cannabis—it is about justice, personal freedom, and the right to access alternative medicine without fear of persecution.

1990 - Namibia Gained Independence: The newly independent nation inherited colonial - era drug laws, including the prohibition of cannabis. The "Abuse of Dependence-Producing Substances and Rehabilitation Centres Act of 1971" is the law currently in force in Namibia, supplemented by the "Combatting of the Abuse of Drugs Bill" of 2006 which increased penalties to prison sentences of between 20 and 40 years (alternative to incarceration includes a fine of between NAD 300,000 and NAD 500,000), even for first-time drug offense, regardless of drug type or quantity. At the time of adoption of the bill, protests were raised against the proposal, particularly by Namibia's artistic and creative communities, and followers of the Rastafarian faith.

2016 - Angela Prusa's Advocacy Begins: After working in California's cannabis industry for a decade, Angela Prusa returns to Namibia and starts advocating for cannabis legalization, emphasizing its medicinal benefits and potential economic advantages. She would later go on to establish the Cannabis and Hemp Association of Namibia (CHAN) with support from the Dagga Couple of neighbouring South Africa, to further represent voices of the communities of people who use or grow cannabis and hemp in the country.

April 2019 - A Call for Change: A Public demonstration took place in Windhoek, led by Cannabis and Hemp Association (CHAN), Ganja Users of Namibia (GUN) and the Rastafari United Front (RUF) supporters. Protesters called for the repeal of the Abuse of Dependence - Producing Substances and Rehabilitation Centres Act of 1971, arguing that it unjustly criminalized cannabis users and prevented people from accessing its medicinal benefits.

April 2020 - Formal Petition for Legalization: GUN and RUF activists submitted a petition to the Speaker of the Parliament of Namibia, urging lawmakers to reconsider cannabis laws. They highlighted both the medicinal properties of cannabis and the economic benefits of legalizing hemp and cannabis industries.

July 2020 - Repeated Pleas for Government Action: After receiving no response, the organizations resubmitted their petition, expressing frustration over the lack of government engagement. Activists continued to push for legislative change through public discourse and social campaigns.

12 to 22 November 2020 - Public Consultation Process Held Without Prior Notice: A public consultation process was convened by the Ministry of Health and Social Services however, due to the public not being granted any time to prepare it resulted in only 56 submissions. Among the submissions is that of GUN activist Brian Jaftha. Many activists criticized the process for being biased against legalization and failing to consider international scientific research on the therapeutic benefits of cannabis.

December 2020 - UN Reclassifies Cannabis: The United Nations, under the guidance of the World Health Organization (WHO), removed cannabis from the list of dangerous drugs, recognizing its therapeutic benefits. Activists in Namibia saw this as validation of their cause and renewed their calls for legislative reform.

September 2021 - Legal Battle in the High Court of Namibia: GUN and RUF took their fight to court, demanding that all references to cannabis be removed from Namibia’s drug laws. Their case also sought recognition of the right to consume cannabis in private homes for personal use and to challenge the constitutionality of all laws prohibiting cannabis in Namibia.

June 2022 - The UN Condemns the Global War on Drugs: The United Nations urged the international community to shift away from punitive drug policies, stating that the global war on drugs had caused "devastation and human rights abuses". Namibian activists cited this statement as further justification for legalizing cannabis.

January 2023 - Tragic Death of Ellest ‘Speedy’ Plaatjie: A shocking incident in Keetmanshoop exposed the brutality of cannabis prohibition. Ellest ‘Speedy’ Plaatjie, a resident known to suffer from treatment - resistant epilepsy, was detained by members of the Nampol Special Reserve Force for possessing a “Skunk Bankie” or small bag of cannabis. Witnesses reported that the officers subjected him to violent assault after taking him to the outskirts of town. Plaatjie relied on cannabis to manage his seizures, a fact well known to his community. Despite his medical condition, two officers allegedly beat him so severely that he succumbed to his injuries on 18 January 2023. His death ignited outrage among cannabis advocates and human rights groups, who condemned the excessive use of force and called for justice. The officers involved were later charged with murder, but were subsequently released on bail.

June 2023 - UN Highlights Racial and Economic Bias in Drug Laws: The UN Human Rights Office reaffirmed that the global war on drugs disproportionately harmed marginalized communities. The report stated, "In various countries, the war on drugs has functioned more as a system of racial and economic control than as an effective tool for reducing drug - related harm." Namibian activists cited this statement as further evidence of the discriminatory impact of drug laws on impoverished communities.

August 2023 - The Loss of Cannabis Activist Niita Nujoma: The activist community suffered another tragic loss with the death of Niita Nujoma, a member of the Cannabis and Hemp Association of Namibia (CHAN). She was last seen on 29 August 2023, and her death was reported as an apparent suicide. Niita had long struggled with severe treatment - resistant epilepsy, a condition that conventional medications had failed to manage. She had advocated for the right to use cannabis medicinally, arguing that it significantly improved her quality of life. Her death was a devastating blow to the movement, highlighting the dire consequences of cannabis criminalization for patients who desperately need alternative treatments.

October 2023 - Conviction of Cannabis Activist: Brian Jafta leader of Ganja Users of Namibia (GUN) and the Rastafari United Front (RUF) in Namibia was convicted on cannabis related charges and sentenced to two years in prison. His conviction was widely condemned by cannabis advocates, who viewed it as a political move to silence a prominent voice for legalization.

June 2024 - Namibian Government Upholds Cannabis Prohibition: Namibian government, through the Ministry of Health and Social Services, declined to permit the commercial cultivation of cannabis for medicinal purposes, citing the availability of effective existing treatments contrary to fact - based evidence that cannabis offers unique medical and therapeutic benefits and many reports of critical medications frequently being out of stock at state hospital pharmacies. Angela Prusa, founder of CHAN, expressed disappointment, emphasizing that cannabis offers a natural alternative with fewer side effects compared to many current pain medications. She noted that the decision appeared not to be based on available evidence.

2 September 2024 - Keetmanshoop Magistrate Strikes Ellest ‘Speedy’ Plaatjie Murder Case From Court Roll: The Keetmanshoop Magistrate’s Court removed the case of Ellest ‘Speedy’ Plaatjie’s murder from the court roll due to what was cited as an "incomplete police investigation." The case involved two members of the Special Reserve Force, Bernard Mulisa and Wilbard Neshuku, who were accused of assaulting Plaatjie, leading to his death. The officers’ bail of N$3,000 each was refunded, further fueling public frustration over the lack of accountability. Activists condemned the decision, stating that the delays and legal loopholes were being used to shield law enforcement from consequences.

October 2024 - Calls for Transparency in Plaatjie’s Case Fall on Deaf Ears: Despite repeated requests from the police for clarity regarding the provisional withdrawal of the case, the prosecution remained unresponsive. Regional Crime Investigations Coordinator, Commissioner Nicodemus Mbango, stated that his office had not received the case docket from the prosecution since the matter was removed from the court roll. The lack of communication has led to further distrust among activists and the public, who view the delays as deliberate attempts to deny justice to Plaatjie’s family. Prosecutor General Martha Imalwa, responding from outside the country, claimed that the case remained under investigation but provided no clear timeline for further action. The continued lack of transparency in the handling of the case reinforced concerns about impunity for police brutality in Namibia.

November 2024 - Brian Jafta Sues Prison Services Over Forced Hair Cutting: Brian Jaftha who had been growing his dreadlocks for more than 20 years as part of his Rastafari faith, was allegedly forced by prison officials to cut his dreadlocks against his will on 16 December 2023. Article 18 of the Universal Declaration of Human Rights and the International Covenant on Civil and Political Rights: protect and individuals freedom to express and practice their religion. The Namibian Constitution, particularly Section 14 guarantees freedom of conscience and cultural expression.

10 December 2024 - Cannabis Activists March on International Human Rights Day: Another protest was held by members of the cannabis activist community which was planned by GUN leadership to take place on International Human Rights day due to its relevance to the subject of cannabis prohibition. There were representatives from RUF, CHAN and medical cannabis advocates in attendance demonstrating solidarity between a variety of individuals from diverse backgrounds. Angela Prusa of CHAN was also present.

The Fight Continues: Despite years of activism, legal battles, and tragic losses, the struggle for cannabis legalization in Namibia continues. The cases of Ellest “Speedy” Plaatjie and Niita Nujoma serve as stark reminders of the human cost of prohibition. As global attitudes shift toward cannabis reform, Namibian activists remain determined to push for policies that uphold human rights, promote public health, and support economic development.
