= Cannabis in Grenada =

Cannabis in Grenada is illegal. Cannabis possession is the most common drug offense on the island, and the annual prevalence of cannabis use amongst adults was reported as 10.8% in 2005.

== History ==
Cannabis was introduced to Grenada by Indian indentured workers who first arrived in the country on 1 May 1857 to work on plantations. They referred to cannabis as "ganja" and used the intoxicant to prepare bhang, which they would consume to relax after working on the plantations.

Rastafarian cannabis growers and distributors played in influential role in the 1979 bloodless coup in Grenada. Nonetheless, just a few months following the 1979 Revolution, Grenada's Rastafari found themselves betrayed by the PRG's decision to clamp down on marijuana cultivation. The disillusionment was solidified in 1980, with the violent break-up of a demonstration by unregistered cannabis-growers.

== Economy ==
Grenada produces some amount of cannabis, and also serves as a transshipment point for drugs to the United States and other markets. Cultivation remains small, in plots of 200–500 plants in remote areas with inaccessible terrain. In 2009, Grenadian authorities seized 460kg of cannabis, as well as 1,309 cannabis cigarettes.

The Grenada Drug Information Network assessed in 2003 that 75 percent of the cannabis grown on Grenada is for local consumption, with the remainder trafficked abroad, particularly to Barbados and Trinidad and Tobago.

== Reform ==
Following increased discussion in Caribbean Community (CARICOM) around the possibility of reforming cannabis laws, in 2014 Grenada's Education and Human Resource Development Minister clarified: "Government's position on this issue is very clear. The cultivation and use of marijuana in Grenada is illegal, and therefore, we will abide by the laws of our land".
