= Cannabis in Antarctica =

- Location of Antarctica (dark green)
- Medicinal: unknown
- Recreational: unknown

The legality of cannabis in Antarctica has not been firmly established, although under the Antarctic Treaty, persons in Antarctica are subject to the laws of their home country.

== Legal status ==
High Times called Antarctica "the most weed-friendly place in the world" because it is "functionally a lawless land", yet acknowledged that visitors may be subject to the laws of their home country, in particular researchers on the continent. Under the Antarctic Treaty, drug-related offenses are handled by the "national law of the expedition" but there are potential conflicts if more than one nation claims jurisdiction. Vice magazine published an analysis of international cannabis law in 2019, concluding that consumption of cannabis under the Treaty is legal for residents of Uruguay, Canada or another nation with adult-use legalization.

== Incidents ==
Seizures of packages bound for U.S. stations in 1981 by New Zealand authorities were said by Capt. Jare M. Pearigen, the Navy officer in charge of the stations, to have "gone a long way toward reducing the use of illicit drugs at American Antarctic stations", implying that at least some personnel had obtained and used cannabis there.

A New Zealand newspaper reported that police had investigated cannabis grown at Amundsen–Scott South Pole Station – perhaps hidden in air ducts – in connection with the death of Rodney Marks in 2000.

A California weekly newspaper reported in 2011 that a United States Marshal at McMurdo Station had ensured that cannabis is not grown at the station's greenhouse.
