= Cannabis in Burkina Faso =

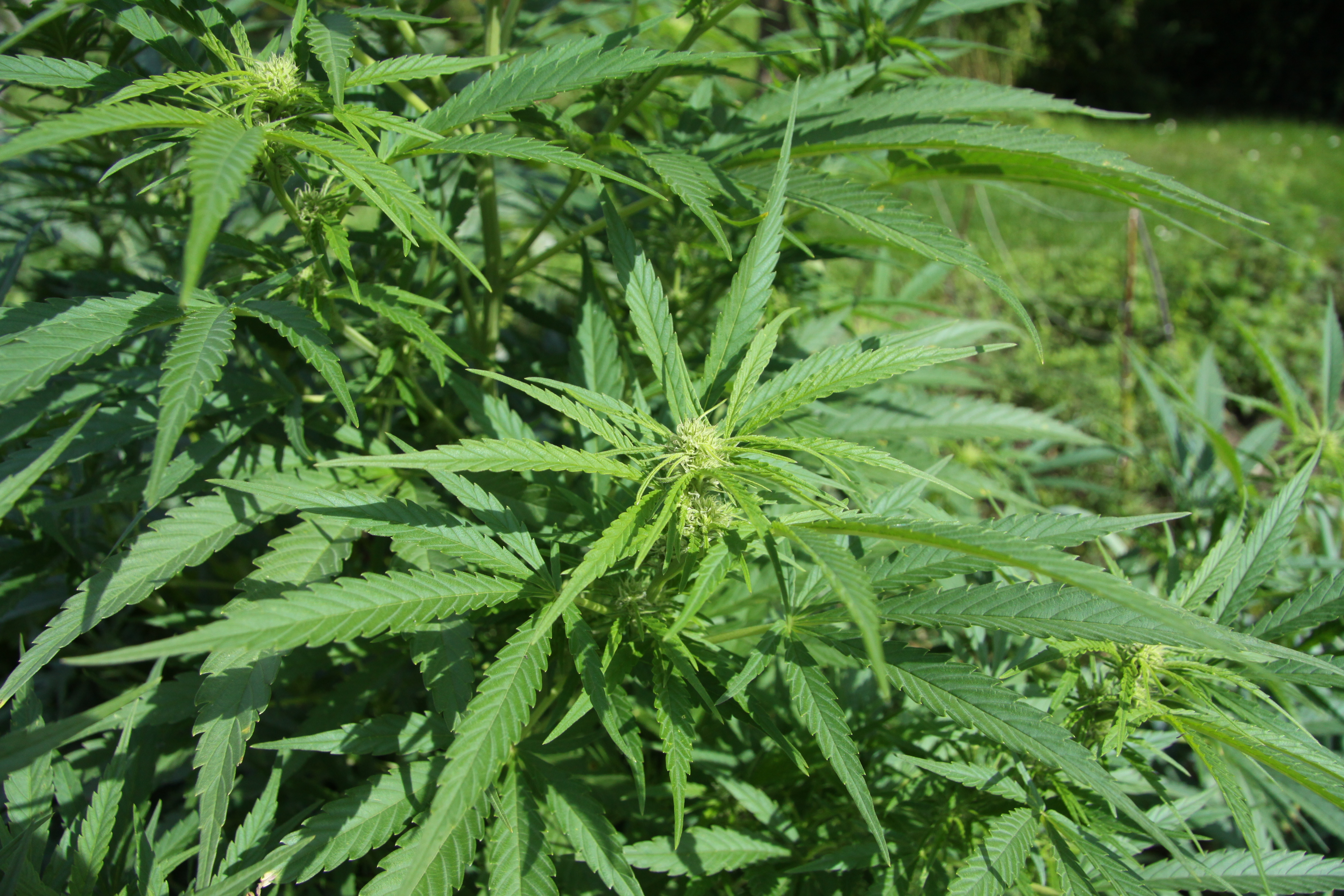
Cannabis sativa plant

Cannabis in Burkina Faso is illegal. Burkina Faso's tropical environment makes it perfect for cannabis growth. However, cannabis rates among adolescents are low, as most cannabis grown in Burkina Faso is exported to countries where cannibis cultivation is hindered by climate or legality.

== Cultivation and usage ==
From 2000 to 2005, Burkina Faso has had a total of 11,411 cannabis-induced seizures, with over 800 kilograms of seized cannabis in 2002. Between 2009 and 2011, cannabis seizures in Burkina Faso doubled. Burkina Faso, part of the Afrotropical realm, has the environment to grow cannabis. Cannabis is commonly cultivated and transported through Burkina Faso, likely to sell to neighboring Nigeria, which has higher usage rates, but stricter laws on cannabis cultivation.

Cannabis has a low rate of usage among Burkina Faso adolescents. Most cannabis grown in Burkina Faso is grown for sale to users in other nearby countries in the Sahel region, a region with environments unable to grow cananbis.
