= Cannabis in Cuba =

Cannabis is illegal in Cuba. Small amounts of possession are punishable by six months to two years in prison. "Cultivation, production, and transit" of large amounts of any illegal drug, including cannabis, results, in a sentence of four to twenty years. International trafficking of the same carries a sentence of 15 to 30 years in prison or, in more severe cases, death.

== History ==
Cannabis was introduced to Cuba as a textile crop in 1793, but planters on the island found sugarcane to be a more lucrative crop.

In 1949, prior to the Cuban Revolution, a journal noted that most of the cannabis found in Cuba was imported from Mexico, but it was increasingly grown on the island, and was receiving attention in medical, judicial, and police publications.

== Laws in Cuba for carrying drugs ==
Medical or recreational use of marijuana is banned in Cuba.

Cannabis laws in Cuba are extremely strict, even for tourists. Cultivation or transit will also lead to heavy penalties.

- Growing Cannabis and any form of transit can lead you 4 to 20 years in prison,
- International trafficking of these illegal drugs will result in 15 to 20 years in prison, and selling these drugs to minors may result in the death penalty (Never applied: Cuba has a de facto moratorium on death penalty since its last execution on April 11, 2003).
