= Cannabis in Bosnia and Herzegovina =

Cannabis in Bosnia and Herzegovina is illegal.

== Polling ==
In 2016, a survey conducted at the Faculty of Philosophy within Mostar University found that 92% of students supported legalizing cannabis for medical purposes.

== Possible legalization of medical cannabis ==
In 2016 it was announced that the Ministry of Civil Affairs had formed a task force to explore the legalizing of cannabis and cannabinoids for medical purposes.

== Cultivation ==
Following the 1992–1995 Bosnian War, Bosnia became a major producer of cannabis, with much of its output being routed through Slovenia and Croatia due to higher prices there.
