= Cannabis in Guatemala =

- Location of Guatemala (dark green)
- Medicinal: Illegal
- Recreational: Illegal

Cannabis in Guatemala, as of 2016, is illegal. Otto Pérez, when he was president of the country, tried to lead a legalization drive, and several congressmen attempted to pass a law for legalization, but those efforts failed. A poll conducted in 2012 said that 41% of Guatemalans might support decriminalization.

== History ==
An early law restricting cannabis was Decree 1331 of 1932, which restricted "plantas letales" to include "Indian hemp and marihuana".

In 2012, former Guatemalan president Otto Pérez announced his support for decriminalizing drugs, but he said that the United States boycotted his plans. He nevertheless tried to promote the idea in diverse forums, culminating in a speech he gave before the United Nations General Assembly in New York on 26 September 2012. A poll in that year revealed that 41% of Guatemalans thought that decriminalization was a good idea.

In 2016 the Commission of legislation and constitutional points of Congress (Spanish: Comisión de Legislación y Puntos Constitucionales del Congreso) in Guatemala rejected the Law to regulate the cultivation, production, distribution, commercialization, medicinal and recreational consumption of cannabis (Spanish: Ley para Regular el Cultivo, Producción, Distribución, Comercialización y Consumo Medicinal y Recreativo del Cannabis) as "unfeasible, inopportune, and unconstitutional". The law had been proposed in April of that year by the congressmen from the party Convergencia. Alvaro Velázquez, one of the congressmen, had said he would keep trying for the initiative to advance but he died in 2017.

== Conviction and sentences ==
According to Guatemalan law, cannabis is illegal, as of 2016, and a person convicted of personal consumption of a drug (including cannabis) would be sentenced to a minimum of 4 months in jail and a 200 quetzals fine, and up to 5 years and a 10,000 quetzals fine, but because "personal consumption" is not defined properly, the prosecutor can accuse the person of traffic and the judge may give a sentence of up to 20 years in prison.

== See also ==
- Cannabis
- Effects of cannabis
- Legality of cannabis
- Medical cannabis
- Drug prohibition
- Drug liberalization
