= Cannabis in Saint Lucia =

Cannabis in Saint Lucia is legal, up to 30 grams. Cannabis is the only drug grown locally on Saint Lucia, and meets 20% of the local demand, with the remainder coming from the other Caribbean islands, predominantly Jamaica and Saint Vincent, and more developed countries such as the United States. Also, a significant portion is shipped from countries in South America such as Columbia and Venezuela.

== Decriminalization ==
The use of Cannabis was decriminalized in Saint Lucia on September 14, 2021 for up to 30 grams
