= Cannabis in Martinique =

Cannabis in Martinique is illegal, but is illicitly produced and transported on the island. Some cannabis is grown locally on Martinique, but appears to be mostly for local consumption and has little impact on the larger drug market.
