= Cannabis in the Federated States of Micronesia =

- Location of the Federated States of Micronesia (dark green)
- Medicinal: Illegal
- Recreational: Illegal

Cannabis in Micronesia is illegal. It is widely believed that cannabis was introduced to the nation in the 1960s by American Peace Corps volunteers. Cannabis is the second most popular drug in Micronesia, after alcohol.
