= Cannabis in Saint Kitts and Nevis =

Cannabis in Saint Kitts and Nevis is illegal but decriminalized. Cannabis is grown on the islands for local consumption, previously in the mountainous interior for the most part, but more recently in abandoned sugar cane fields as well.

== National Cannabis Commission ==
On February 20, 2019, Prime Minister Timothy Harris announced that his cabinet had accepted the unanimous recommendations from the National Cannabis Commission and would introduce legislation to legalize medicinal cannabis and decriminalize recreational use for persons over the age of 18. Individuals found with under 15 grams of cannabis or growing 5 plants or less would only receive a ticket.

== May 2019 court ruling ==
On May 3, 2019, High Court Judge Eddy Ventose ruled that Rastafarians and other adults over the age of 18 can use, possess, and cultivate cannabis in private and that the government has 90 days to change the cannabis laws in the country.

== Decriminalization ==
On July 31, 2019, a bill was passed by the National Assembly to decriminalize up to 15 grams of cannabis, punishable by $50 fine. For public use the fine was set at $1000.

In February 2020, the National Assembly of Saint Kitts and Nevis raised the allowed amount of cannabis to 56 grams.
