= Cannabis in Moldova =

Cannabis in Moldova is illegal but decriminalized.

Simple drug use is not a crime in the Republic of Moldova, but it is an administrative offence according to Article 85 of the Administrative Offences Code passed in 2008. The illegal purchase or possession of herbal cannabis (2 grams; 1/16 oz) without the purpose of distribution, as well as their consumption without a medical prescription, are sanctioned with a fine of up to three conventional units or with community service of up to 2 hours.
