= Cannabis in El Salvador =

The possession and use of cannabis is illegal in El Salvador for both recreational and medical purposes. The country is a signatory of the 1988 United Nations Convention Against Illicit Traffic in Narcotic Drugs and Psychotropic Substances, and has criminalized the production and distribution of the drug.

El Salvador (along with Peru and Bolivia) is one of the most conservative countries in Latin America in regard to drug policy. According to a 2016 study published by the International Journal of Drug Policy, only 17% of Salvadorans reported having used cannabis.

== Decriminalization efforts ==
In 2014, over 700 people protested in San Salvador in favor of decriminalizing the consumption and personal cultivation of cannabis. The demonstration was organized by the activist group La María Guanaca and backed by the Evangelical Protestant Church of El Salvador.

However, support for cannabis reform remains very low. A 2014 survey by AmericasBarometer found that a mere 8% of Salvadorans supported legalization of the drug. According to the survey, support was highest among people with higher levels of education, and low among people who consider religion to be especially important in their lives.

== See also ==
- MS-13, an international drug trafficking gang with close ties to El Salvador

== Bibliography ==
- Cruz, José Miguel; Queirolo, Rosario; Boidi, María Fernanda (2 August 2016). "Determinants of Public Support for Marijuana Legalization in Uruguay, the United States, and El Salvador". Journal of Drug Issues. 46 (4): 308–325. doi:10.1177/0022042616649005. S2CID 77094173.
- Mendiburo-Seguel, Andrés; Vargas, Salvador; Oyanedel, Juan C.; Torres, Francisca; Vergara, Eduardo; Hough, Mike (March 2017). "Attitudes towards drug policies in Latin America: Results from a Latin-American Survey" (PDF). International Journal of Drug Policy. 41: 8–13. doi:10.1016/j.drugpo.2016.10.001. PMID 27988428.
