= Cannabis in Bolivia =

- Location of Bolivia (dark green)
- Medicinal: Illegal
- Recreational: Illegal

Cannabis in Bolivia is illegal, but cultivated illicitly, mostly for domestic consumption. Bolivian law treats cannabis equally to cocaine, with possession of one gram punishable by 10–25 years in prison.

Bolivia's Anti-Drug Law 1008 of 1988 mandates rehabilitation and treatment for drug users.
