= Cannabis in the Cayman Islands =

Cannabis in the Cayman Islands has been legal for medical purposes since 2017. The use of cannabis for recreational purposes still remains prohibited.

== History ==
In May 2017, the Cayman Islands legalized medical cannabis.

By September 2019, vaporizable cannabinoid products were banned due to concerns raised by the Cayman Islands Medical and Dental Society over unethical drug advertising.

By August 2020, restrictions on medical cannabis were lifted by chief medical officer, John Lee.

In December 2022, Cayman Islands lawmakers voted to conduct a referendum in 2023 on the decriminalization of limited quantities of cannabis. 2023 passed without a referendum being held. In October 2024, Minister of Tourism Kenneth Bryan announced that the referendum had been rescheduled to take place alongside the general election in 2025. It was held as part of the 2025 Caymanian referendum; 55% voted in favour of cannabis decriminalisation.

== Legal status ==
Cannabis in the Cayman Islands has been legal for medical purposes since 2017. The use of cannabis for recreational purposes still remains prohibited. However, there have been various steps taken to decriminalise minor possession or consumption offences in certain situations.

In the Cayman Islands, medical cannabis is dispensed as capsules, oral oil drops, and vaporized forms. Importing or exporting any cannabis product, even for medicinal use, is prohibited. Travelers using medical cannabis are advised to consult a local physician or medical centers such as David Kwinter, Doctors Express, or Cayman Islands Hospital prior to their visit.

== Counter-drug operations ==
The Cayman Islands cooperates with the United States Coast Guard to share intelligence on drug trafficking. In 1998, a USCG helicopter radioed information to a Cayman Islands vessel, leading them to intercept a Jamaican fast-boat with 1600lbs of cannabis. In 1995 alone, Cayman seized 2.6 metric tons of cannabis; 742 pounds of that were seized in one operation, found in burlap sacks labeled "brown sugar made in Jamaica".

== CBD oil legalization ==
In 2016, the governor of the British Overseas Territory of the Cayman Islands approved a change to the Misuse of Drugs Law to allow the importation and use of CBD oil for medical purposes.
