= Cannabis in Samoa =

- Location of Samoa (red)
- Medicinal: Illegal
- Recreational: Illegal

Cannabis is illegal in Samoa.

== Law ==
The possession, sale, disposition, cultivation, production, and prescribing of cannabis is regulated by the Narcotics Act 1967. Cannabis is a Class B narcotic under the Act. The Act has only been amended twice since its creation in 1967, 2006 and 2009 respectively.

=== Cultivation ===
It is illegal to cultivate cannabis or have a cannabis seed in your possession under Section 6 of the Act. If found guilty, the maximum penalty is imprisonment of 14 years.

=== Possession ===
It is illegal to possess or attempt to possess cannabis under Section 7 of the Act. If found guilty, the maximum penalty is imprisonment of 14 years.

=== Reform ===
In 2015 the Samoa Law Reform Commission was asked to review the Narcotics Act. It issued its final report in December 2017 recommending a regulated regime for medicinal cannabis. In January 2018 lawyer Unasa Iuni Sapolu called on the government to legalise cannabis for recreational and medicinal use. The call was rejected by Prime Minister Tuila'epa Sa'ilele Malielegaoi, while Minister of Health Tuitama Talalelei Tuitama responded that cannabis needed to remain illegal for Biblical reasons. In April 2019 a proposal by Australian medicinal cannabis company Leaf Relief for cannabis to be cultivated for medicinal use was also rejected.
