= Cannabis in the Solomon Islands =

- Location of the Solomon Islands (red)
- Medicinal: Illegal
- Recreational: Illegal

The production, sale and possession of cannabis for medicinal or recreational purposes is illegal in the Solomon Islands. Offenders receive a fine of up to $100,000 or imprisonment for up to ten years. A 2011 survey of young people found that 16.1% of males and 11.1% of females had ever used cannabis.

The Solomon Islands, like other island nations in the West Pacific, is utilised as a staging point in the illicit drug trade between South East Asia and Australasia. Cannabis is also illicitly cultivated here.
