= Cannabis in Dominica =

Cannabis in Dominica is a Class B drug to cultivate, sell or possess. This means that possession is punishable by 12 months and EC$12,000 (summary) or 2 years and EC$20,000 (on indictment). Supplying, production, or importation are punishable by 3 years and EC$100,000 (summary) or 14 years and EC$200,000 (on indictment).

In 1995, the US government described Dominica as a minor cannabis producer but "increasingly exploited transit route", with some cannabis cultivated on the island but mostly consumed locally. In 1994 Dominican authorities seized 741 kg (1,634 lb) of cannabis and eradicated 48,855 plants.

A 2011 report noted that Dominica had large-scale cannabis cultivation for both trafficking and local use, with an estimated 85 ha (210 acres) of cannabis cultivated annually.

On the 26th of October 2020 the Commonwealth of Dominica government passed an amendment to a bill to decriminalize the possession of 28 g (1 oz) or less of Cannabis. The amendment also allows the cultivation of 3 cannabis plants at their place of residence.

== Sources ==
- "2020 DRUGS (PREVENTION OF MISUSE) ACT (AMENDMENT)" (PDF). Archived from the original (PDF) on 31 October 2020.
- "Dominica parliament passes legislation to decriminalize small amounts of marijuana". Dominica News Online. 27 October 2020.
