= Cannabis in Chad =

Cannabis in Chad is illegal.

In 2024, 15,000 one troy ounce, .9999 fine silver coins, with a face value of 5000 CFA each, were minted, backed by the Republic of Chad, with Chad's coat of arms on the obverse side and a seven-fingered cannabis leaf on the reverse side.

== Cultivation ==
Per a 1999 report, the islands of Lake Chad contain a number of hectares of cannabis, but local police have not destroyed them.
