= Cannabis in the Maldives =

- Location of the Maldives (dark green)
- Medicinal: Illegal
- Recreational: Illegal

Cannabis is illegal in the Maldives.

== History ==
As per the United Nations Economic and Social Commission for Asia and the Pacific, drug availability was first recorded in the 1970s in the Maldives. Cannabis usage was noted among tourists, who may have introduced it to the country.

== Cultivation ==
The Yearbook of the United Nations 2003 noted that cannabis was illicitly cultivated in every country of South Asia, with the exception of the Maldives.
