= Cannabis in Honduras =

Cannabis in Honduras is illegal for possession, sale, transportation and cultivation.
