= Cannabis in Gabon =

Cannabis in Gabon is illegal.

== History ==
In 1910, European traders in Gabon carried locally produced cannabis.
