= Cannabis in Syria =

- Location of Syria (dark green)
- Medicinal: Illegal
- Recreational: Illegal

Cannabis in Syria is illegal. Under the policies of the Syrian Arab Republic cannabis was illegal and punishable by up to 20 years in prison in large drug trafficking offenses, if someone is considered an addict by the Syrian government then they face no criminal penalties for drug use and possession. Since the start of the Syrian civil war cannabis laws had become widely unenforced by the Syrian government as well as Kurdish and rebel controlled territories, while civilians growing cannabis in Jabhat al-Nusra controlled territory face arrest. On multiple occasions Bashar al-Assad granted general amnesties to multiple crimes which included drug trafficking offenses.

== Legality ==
The cultivation, sale, and possession of cannabis for recreational or medical purposes are illegal in Syria.

== History ==
Under the French mandate system in the early 20th century, Syria and Lebanon were major cannabis producers. Following the Second International Opium Convention of 1925, the League of Nations endorsed an agenda against cannabis and other drugs. The enforcement of this anti-cannabis agenda was placed on the French administration under international supervision.

Under President Shukri al-Quwatli (1943–1949), the cultivating of cannabis was banned in Syria, though authorities noted they had little ability to prevent the Druze of the Jabal al-Druze region from producing hashish.

In 1993, Syria enacted Law No. 2 which authorizes punishment, up to and including capital punishment, for the manufacture, transportation, and sale of narcotics.

== Civil War ==
As the country has become destabilized as a result of the civil war, people living in areas controlled by the Syrian Democratic Forces and rebel controlled territories have begun growing cannabis as a way of making money to fight poverty.

During the civil war cannabis was sold to and used by Syrian Arab Army soldiers, ISIS soldiers and Syrian rebels.
