= Cannabis in Guadeloupe =

Cannabis in Guadeloupe is illegal, but is cultivated and transported illicitly. A 2007 report noted the prevalence of cannabis among youth in Guadeloupe at 7%.

== Trafficking ==
Cannabis grown on the Windward Islands is transported to Guadeloupe, where it commands a higher price. Guadeloupe is located amongst several major cannabis producers, and thus serves as an entry point to the cannabis markets in Europe and North America.
