= Cannabis in Réunion =

Cannabis in Réunion is illegal, but is grown illicitly and is locally known as zamal. It is used both recreationally and ritually.

== History ==
It is not known when cannabis, locally referred to as zamal, was introduced to Réunion, although it was likely brought in by slaves from nearby Madagascar. Inspired by the prevalence of cannabis in Indian traditions and in the tradition of the French, some Réunion poets and writers openly praised cannabis. Cannabis usage began to pick up in the 1950s especially in the more developed parts of the country and among the youth. However, law enforcement then was lax, as authorities did not view cannabis as a "social menace".

== Cultivation and consumption ==
The climate of Réunion is particularly suitable for the cultivation of cannabis. Cannabis cigarettes are smoked by both the Malagasy people and Indian priests in Réunion for ritualistic reasons. Cannabis is also cultivated by the locals to ward off pests and, less commonly, treat fever by boiling its roots and leaves. In recent years, the recreational use of cannabis among the youth is no longer as prevalent as compared to that of other drugs like cocaine and MDMA.

== Legality ==
Cannabis in Réunion is illegal. Under the Code of Public Health, individuals found guilty of trafficking cannabis face a fine of up to 75,000 euros and a five-year prison sentence, whereas the possession and intent to sell cannabis is punishable by a ten-year prison sentence and a fine of 500,000 euros. Cannabis users face up to 3,750 euros in fines and one year in prison.

== In popular culture ==
In 1951, Réunion poet Jean Albany released his first anthology of poems titled Zamal, which was described by Peter France in The New Oxford Companion to Literature in French as "breaking out with a long-standing tradition of exoticism and out-moded Parnassianism in the literature of Réunion".
