= Cannabis in Pakistan =

- Location of Pakistan (dark green)
- Medicinal: Legal
- Recreational: Illegal
- Hemp: Legal

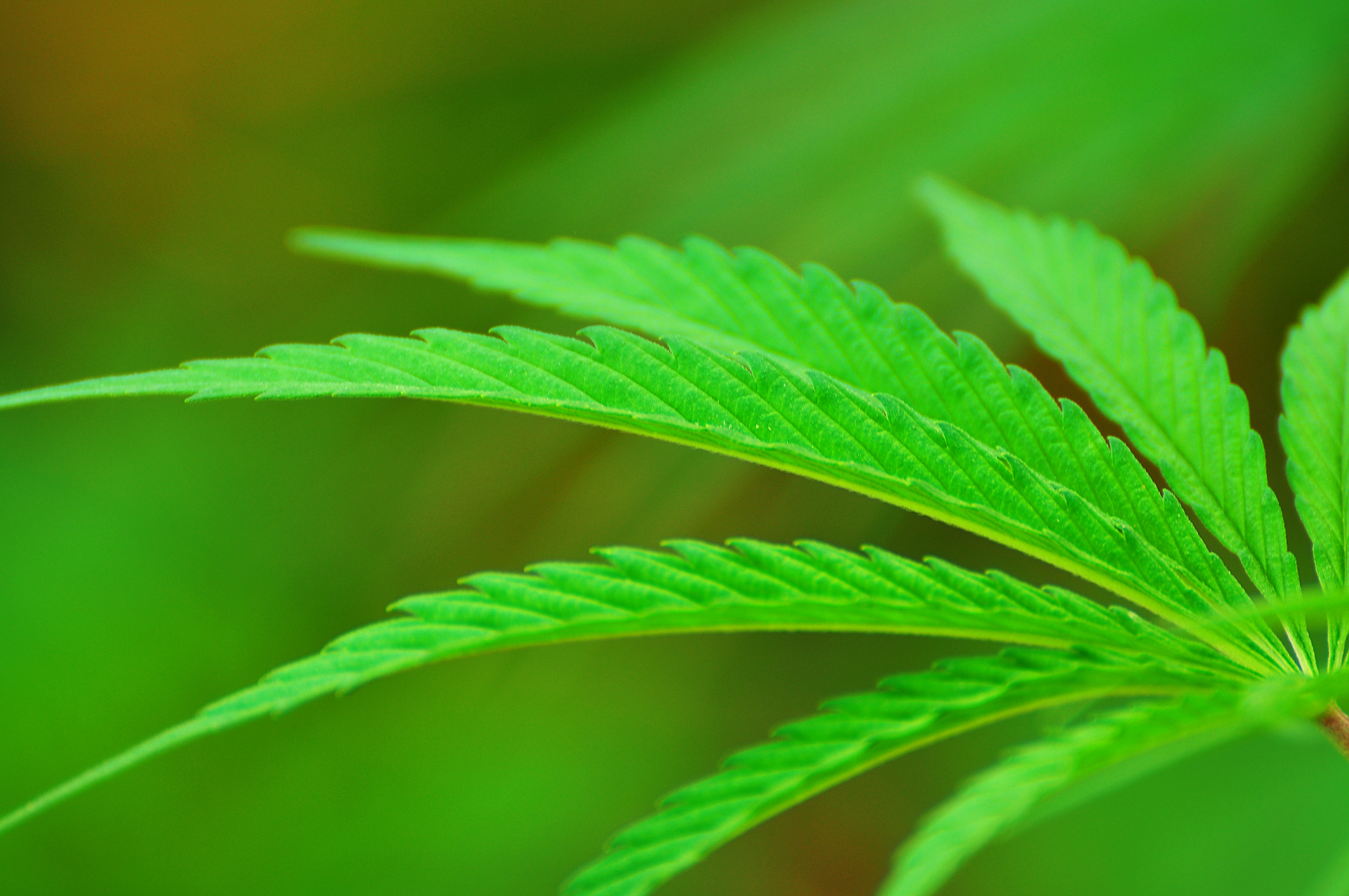
Cannabis growing in Islamabad.

Cannabis is illegal in Pakistan for recreational use, although since September 2020, extracts of cannabis can be used for industrial and medical use. Cannabis is widely consumed in Pakistan as charas and bhang.

== History ==
Before influence from the British and American governments, cannabis was widely used within Central Asia medicinally, as a staple, for textile, and for psychotropic effects. It was revered, as stated within the Atharvaveda, as one of five sacred plants and it was believed that a guardian angel exists within it.

A 1983 report by the Pakistan Narcotics Control Board states that drug usage was largely stable in the 1950s-1970s with opium and cannabis being common, but there was an upsurge in cannabis usage by middle class youths in the late 1960s and early 1970s due to the influence of Western pop culture. However, by the 1980s the habit fell from fashion in the middle class.

== Criminalisation ==
Under the Control of Narcotics Substance Act of 1997, it is illegal to produce, manufacture, extract, prepare, possess, offer for sale, sell, purchase or distribute cannabis in Pakistan. Although after acquiring a permit from provincial or federal government its cultivation is allowed for medical, scientific or industrial purposes. If found in violation of the above, it is punishable with imprisonment which may extend to seven years, with a fine, or with both.

Enforcement of laws against hard drugs is prioritized in Pakistan, while the personal use of cannabis is often overlooked. This is particularly true in various tribal regions of Pakistan, where cannabis is sometimes sold in public markets.

== Legal Status ==
On Tuesday, Sep 1st, 2020 the Federal Government of Pakistan approved the legalization of hemp production. This decision came after the realization of the fact that the country has a natural abundance of cannabis. Moreover, Pakistan can earn over one billion USD from its products, thereby boosting its economy.

== Usage ==
Cannabis is widely used in Pakistan, and smoked as charas (hashish) or consumed as a drink as bhang. According to a 2013 report 6.4 million people in Pakistan consume cannabis. With the legalization of Cannabidiol (CBD), the country is looking ahead to export non-psychoactive hemp and other derivatives to international markets.
