= Cannabis in Belarus =

Legality of cannabis in Europe Legal for recreational use Legal for medical use Illegal

Cannabis in Belarus is illegal.

== Cultivation ==
A 1996 report noted that cultivation of cannabis was present in Belarus, fueling usage in the country; the same report noted that personal possession of cannabis was not at that time illegal. Though production and use of cannabis was already illegal, on 31 December 2016 Belarus also banned the cultivation of cannabis.
