= Cannabis in the Bahamas =

Cannabis in the Bahamas is illegal recreationally, but legal for medical and religious use.

== Law ==
On February 27, 1929, the government passed the Dangerous Drugs Act which dealt with drug offences in the Bahamas, including cannabis.

In 1962, Act 26 amended the Act, providing a new definition of Indian hemp which, "includes all parts of the plant Cannabis Sativa whether growing or not from which the resin has not been extracted; the resin extracted from any part of such plant; and every compound, manufacture, salt derivative, mixture or preparation of such plant or resin".

In 2023, the Dangerous Drugs Act was amended to remove the definition of "Indian Hemp" as well as any reference to "Indian Hemp".

In the same year, the Cannabis Bill was enacted, which sets the framework for the regulation of growth, sale, consumption, and possession. The bill states that cannabis may be used legally for medicinal and religious purposes.

=== Possession ===
==== Offence ====
Section 29(6) of the Dangerous Drugs Act deals with simple possession of cannabis:

Where any drug to which this Act applies is, without the proper authority, found in the possession of any person or stored or kept in a place other than a place prescribed for the storage or keeping of such drug, such person, or the occupier or owner of such place or the owner of or other person responsible for the keeping of such drug unless he can prove such drug was deposited there without his knowledge or consent, shall be guilty of an offence against this Act.

==== Sentence ====
Anyone convicted of possession of cannabis, is liable:

on conviction on information:

a fine of $125,000.00 or imprisonment for 10 years, or both, pursuant to Section 29(2)(a) of the Act.

on summary conviction,

a fine of $50,000.00 or imprisonment for 5 years, or both, pursuant to Section 29(2)(a) of the Act.

Under Section 29(2) of the Act, the individual must also forfeit to the Crown all real or personal property in respect of which the offence was committed.

=== Possession with intent to supply ===
==== Offence ====
Section 22(1) of the Dangerous Drugs Act states that, "It is an offence for a person to have a dangerous drug in his possession, whether lawfully or not, with intent to supply it to another in contravention of the provisions of this Act.

If a person is found with two or more packets containing cannabis, they will be presumed to be possessing that drug with the intent to supply it to others, unless they can prove the contrary under Section 22(3) of the Act.

==== Sentence ====
Anyone convicted of possessing cannabis with the intent to supply it to another, is liable:

on conviction on information:

a fine of $500,000.00 or imprisonment for 30 years, or both, pursuant to Section 22(2)(a) of the Act.

on summary conviction:

a fine of $250,000.00 or imprisonment for 5 years, or both, pursuant to Section 22(2)(b) of the Act.

Anyone convicted on information to possessing cannabis with the intent to supply it to a child or young person, is liable:

on conviction on information:

a fine of $750,000.00 or imprisonment for 40 years, or both, pursuant to Section 22(4)(a) of the Act.

on summary conviction:

a fine of $500,000.00 or imprisonment for 5 years, or both, pursuant to Section 22(4)(b) of the Act.

== Economy ==
The Bahamas role as a transit country for cannabis is noted as beginning in 1968, when 300 pounds of cannabis were flown from Jamaica to Bimini. As recently as 2010 the country was noted as a midpoint for Jamaican cannabis being smuggled to the United States.

Historically the Bahamas was a drug trafficking country, but not a drug producing one, until a 1991 seizure of 40,000 cannabis seedlings and 1,000 adult plants on Andros Island called that assumption into question.

== Present-day status ==
In January 2018, the Caribbean Community Regional Commission held a town hall meeting in Nassau on the issue of decriminalizing cannabis.

CARICOM Regional Commission on Marijuana published a report recommending the declassification of marijuana as a dangerous drug in all legislation and the reclassification of the drug as a controlled substance, similarly to tobacco and alcohol. The report stated that the Bahamas could see a financial benefit of around $5 million from the legalization of the substance and regulation of its sale.

The Bahamas National Commission on Marijuana has been tasked with exploring and making recommendations to the government on the issue of cannabis. It is expected to deliver its first draft to the government by August 2019, after receiving a three-month extension to present its findings.
