= Cannabis in Cambodia =

- Location of Cambodia (dark green)
- Medicinal: Illegal (rarely enforced)
- Recreational: Illegal (rarely enforced)

Cannabis in Cambodia is illegal. This prohibition is enforced opportunistically. Many "Happy" restaurants located in Phnom Penh, Siem Reap and Sihanoukville publicly offer food cooked with marijuana, or as a side garnish.

== Law ==
=== History ===
Cannabis was probably introduced to Southeast Asia around the 16th century, and used medicinally and in cuisine. Cannabis has been traditionally grown in Cambodia and is a common ingredient in food. By 1961 in compliance with the Single Convention on Narcotics treaty it was technically made illegal but the law was unenforced, and marijuana was openly sold. In 1992 during a United Nations intervention the drug was specifically made illegal but still the law remained unenforced.

=== Enforcement ===
Although it is illegal, police do not harass cannabis users and businesses openly sell cannabis products to the public. As of 2009, the UNODC stated that cannabis production cultivation had "ceased to be a major concern" in Cambodia.

== Culture ==
Marijuana is openly sold in markets, restaurants, and bars. "Happy pizza" is the term for cannabis infused pizza frequently sold in restaurants across Cambodia. Among Cambodians it is viewed as something older people use and is not popular with the youth. In tourist heavy areas "happy pizza" is more commonly sold due to its popularity among travelers.
