= Cannabis in Kosovo =

Cannabis in Kosovo is illegal for both medicinal or recreational purposes. Penalties are defined by Article 269 of the Kosovo Criminal Code, last revised in January 2019. For first-time offenders, possession of illicit substances leads to either a one-year sentence or, more likely, a financial penalty of €250-300. A 2014 survey of 5,500 Kosovans reported that 10% knew someone who had used cannabis and 12.6% reported having easy access to cannabis.

== History ==
The Kingdom of Yugoslavia ratified the Second International Opium Convention on 4 September 1929. The first law to sanction drug use was the Criminal Code of the Kingdom of Serbs, Croats and Slovenes passed on 27 January 1929 and which entered into force on 1 January 1930, which sets a prison sentence of up to 6 months for "serving" narcotic drugs in the section "Crimes against Public Health".

== Trafficking ==
Since the Kosovo War, organised crime in Kosovo has involved the trafficking of drugs including marijuana, heroin, and cocaine. Kosovo acts as a transit hub for traffic between Afghanistan and Italy, and from Albania to the rest of Europe. From 2001 to 2007, a total of 286.89 kg of cannabis was seized by Kosovo Police. However, cannabis is cultivated in Kosovo primarily for domestic use. The cultivation of cannabis is spread throughout most parts of the country's territory.
