= Cannabis in Yemen =

- Location of Yemen (dark green)
- Medicinal: Illegal
- Recreational: Illegal

Cannabis in Yemen is illegal. Cannabis is less common in Yemen than khat.

== History ==
Cannabis is listed as one of the agricultural products of Yemen during the Rasulid dynasty (1229–1454).

== Economy ==
Yemen is Saudi Arabia's principal source of drugs.

In 2007, Yemen was the fifteenth-most prolific producer of cannabis resin, comprising 0.4% of seized cannabis globally.
