= Cannabis in Taiwan =

- Location of Taiwan (dark green)
- Medicinal: Illegal
- Recreational: Illegal

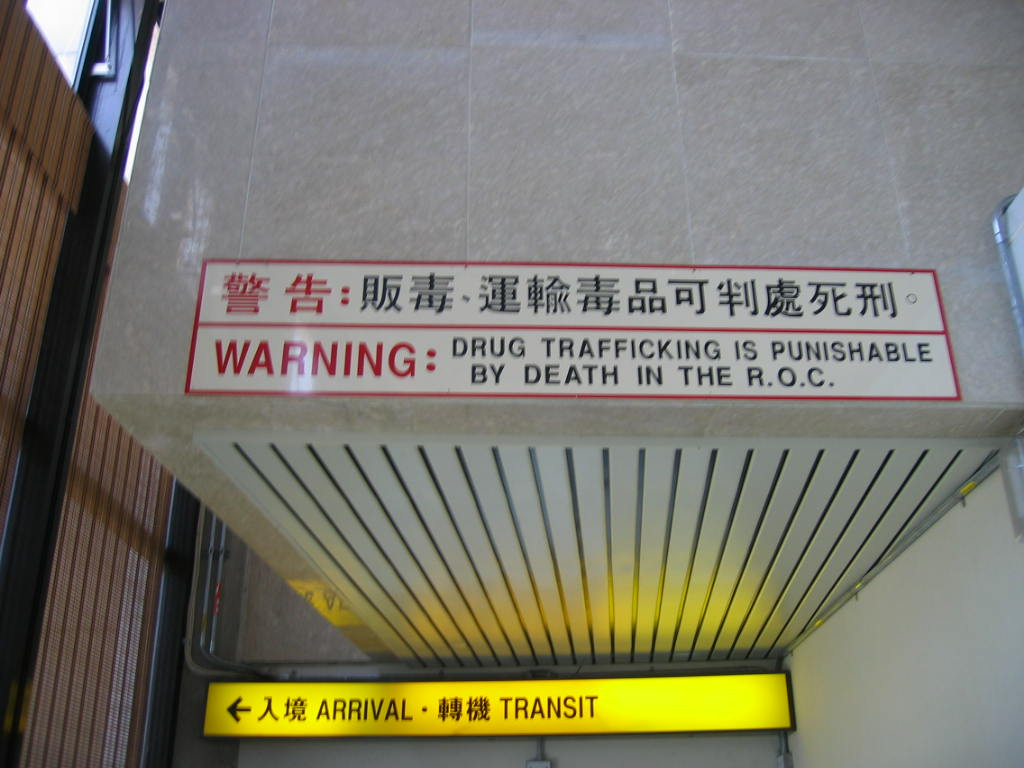
Sign at the Taiwan Taoyuan International Airport warning drug traffickers that the crime is punishable by the death penalty

Cannabis in Taiwan is illegal. It is listed as a category 2 narcotic by Narcotics Hazard Prevention Act in Taiwan. Offenders of manufacturing, transporting, or selling category 2 narcotics are subject to life imprisonment or a minimum 10-year fixed-term imprisonment, and may also be subject to a fine of no more than NT$15 million.
