= Cannabis in Senegal =

Cannabis in Senegal is illegal; the drug is locally referred to as yamba.

== History ==
As early as the 1960s, cannabis (referred to by locals as yamba) was produced in the Casamance region of southern Senegal by separatist rebels. The rebels initially protected growers from the government, but by the 1990s had moved to taxing cannabis cultivators to finance the resistance. By 1995, collected cannabis taxes had reached several million dollars annually. A 1995 report noted that cannabis was the only drug produced in Senegal, and mostly for local consumption, but that the government had taken few steps to counter the cannabis trade.

In 1999, Senegalese authorities launched "Operation Cannabis V", which resulted in the destruction of some 500 kilograms (1,100 lb) of treated cannabis and another 7 tonnes (6.9 long tons; 7.7 short tons) of cannabis being confiscated.

== Economy ==
Cannabis is cultivated in many parts of Senegal, particularly in the southern Casamance region. A small amount of cannabis is imported from neighbouring countries including Ghana, Mali, and Gambia, while cannabis resin has been found to enter Europe from Senegal, though that may have originated in further countries. Cannabis in Senegal is mainly distributed in the more developed regions, especially Dakar. A 1998 report stated that farmers preferred cannabis as a crop since it was worth 20 times more money per kilogram than the national principle crop, groundnuts; in 2020, a kilogram of cannabis in Senegal was reportedly worth $25–50 or 15,000 to 30,000 West African CFA francs.
