= Cannabis in the Central African Republic =

Cannabis in the Central African Republic is illegal.

== History ==
During the Central African Empire administration (1976–1979), production, possession, or sale of cannabis was illegal.
