= Cannabis in Palau =

- Location of Palau (red)
- Medicinal: Illegal
- Recreational: Illegal

Cannabis in Palau is illegal, but reports indicate the drug is widely produced and consumed on the island nation. Palau is a former Trust Territory of the Pacific Islands of the United States which gained independence in 1994, and has a population under 20,000.

Reports by the World Health Organization and UNODC have been called into question for the accuracy of their claims that Palau has the highest cannabis usage rates in the world. Despite controversy over the numbers, usage appears high, and a 2005 academic paper states the Palau police ignore public consumption.

== International ranking ==
A 2011 WHO report, as well as the 2012 United Nations World Drug Report stated that Palau has the world's highest adult cannabis consumption rate, at 24.2% annually. However, critics have questioned these results, noting that the numbers were based on a survey conducted at the island's only public high school, which had then been extrapolated to the entire nation. However, academics have noted that while the numbers may not be reliable, Palau does have prevalent cannabis use.

== Cannabis economy ==
A 1989 American congressional hearing noted that Palau was exporting some 300 pounds of cannabis per week.

An International Monetary Fund report noted that Palauan marijuana farmers produced for local consumption, and also exported cannabis to Guam and the Federated States of Micronesia.

By the 1980s, cannabis had become the most valuable export crop of Palau.

== Eradication efforts ==
In the early 1980s, a joint US effort removed 3,347 cannabis plants, which had been used to produce sinsemilla, from the island of Peleliu.

== Legal history ==
In 2006, a law requiring that all elected officials be tested for illicit drugs was passed by the Senate of Palau.
