= Cannabis in Andorra =

As of 2026, cannabis remains illegal in the principality of Andorra. In 2021, the government of Andorra commissioned a study of the potential to cultivate cannabis for therapeutic use. The study carried out by the Institute for Research and Agrifood Technology (IRTA) suggested that there were opportunities in agrogenomic research and extraction of compounds for pharmaceuticals.

The trafficking of cannabis can be punished by up to two years in prison and fines totally double the value of the drug. Individual use of cannabis or similar in a public space may be punished by arrest, or by fines up to 600 euros.
