= Cannabis in Azerbaijan =

- Location of Azerbaijan (dark green)
- Medicinal: Illegal
- Recreational: Illegal

Cannabis in Azerbaijan is illegal but is cultivated illicitly, and has a long history as a medical remedy in the nation.

== History ==
Academic Farid Alakbarov has written on cannabis medicines found in medieval Azerbaijani texts, including treatments for uterine tumors, hemorrhoids, and hysteria.

== Cultivation ==
Per a 2011 report, cannabis is cultivated, mostly in southern Azerbaijan, "to a modest extent".
