= Cannabis in Tonga =

- Location of Tonga (red)
- Medicinal: Illegal
- Recreational: Illegal

Cannabis in Tonga is illegal, but cultivated illicitly. A 1990s report attributed increased cannabis usage in Tonga to foreign travelers and returned Tongan emigres.
