= Cannabis in Mozambique =

Cannabis in Mozambique is illegal; the drug is locally referred to as suruma.

== History ==
There are several theories as to how and when cannabis arrived in Mozambique, with one recurring theory being that it was introduced from India either by Arab traders or by Portuguese merchants. In the 1580s Portuguese Dominican missionary João dos Santos noted that cannabis was used in Mozambique to suppress hunger.

== Trafficking ==
Aside from indigenous production, Mozambique also serves as a transit point for cannabis and hashish smuggled from Pakistan and Afghanistan to Africa, and on to Europe and Canada.

== Reform ==
The Portuguese-Mozambican journalist Carlos Cardoso (d. 2000) proposed that Mozambique legalize cannabis, both for industrial use, and for export to the Netherlands.
