= Cannabis in São Tomé and Príncipe =

Cannabis in São Tomé and Principe is illegal, but is trafficked illicitly. In the 1890s, Portuguese Angolans sold "notable quantities" to Angolan laborers in São Tomé, despite cannabis growing prolifically in the vicinity of the laborers' quarters.
