= Cannabis in Kiribati =

- Location of Kiribati (red)
- Medicinal: Illegal
- Recreational: Illegal

Cannabis in Kiribati is illegal with severe punishments for the production, sale, and possession of marijuana for medicinal or recreational purposes. A 2011 survey of young people, found that 6.8% of males and 1.6% of females had ever used cannabis.

Kiribati, like other island nations in the West Pacific is utilised as a staging point in the illicit drug trade, between Southeast Asia and Australia. Fishermen turned to drug trafficking and gun running via organized crime due to overfishing decreasing the value of fish so low that their previous lifestyles were unsustainable. Kiribati's huge exclusive economic zone is too large to be patrolled effectively by the Kiribati Police Service. In December 2019, a 3kg package of marijuana, along with 1.5kg of cocaine, was found in the Line Islands.
