= Cannabis in Iceland =

- Location of Iceland (green)
- Medicinal: Illegal
- Recreational: Illegal

Cannabis in Iceland is illegal. Offenses such as sale and cultivation are heavily punished and can result in jail time. Possession of small amounts will not result in jail time, but offenders will still be subject to arrest and payment of a fine.

== History ==
Cannabis was first banned on 14 October 1969, when a regulation was set to ban cannabis. The regulation added cannabis to an existing anti-opium regulation, due to concerns about rising popularity among youth. In 1974, the ban was added to the Icelandic legislation.

== Statistics ==
6.6% of the population consumes cannabis regularly. That number is commonly believed to be 18.3% due to data confusion; 18.3% is the number of Icelanders who consume cannabis regularly out of the subset of the population who has ever consumed cannabis.
