= Cannabis in Saudi Arabia =

- Location of Saudi Arabia (dark green)
- Medicinal: Illegal
- Recreational: Illegal

The use and possession of cannabis is strictly illegal in the Kingdom of Saudi Arabia. Use and possession for personal use of any kind of recreational drugs is usually punishable by imprisonment if caught. For foreign citizens, there would generally be more leniency. Imprisonment for personal use of cannabis could go up to 1 to 6 months in prison with or without whippings for first time offenders. Imprisonment for drug dealing can range between 2 and 10 years in prison with whippings. Repeated dealing and or smuggling of large amounts of drugs usually result in harsher time in prison or can even include the death penalty, although recent executions are very rare. Foreigners who use cannabis could be deported.

In 2003, the UNODC rated Saudi Arabia as third globally in its measures to fight drug abuse and trafficking.

Hashish in Saudi Arabia is largely trafficked by sea from Pakistan; a 2007 report notes that hashish sold for US$2,130 per kilogram.
