= Cannabis in Kuwait =

- Location of Kuwait (dark green)
- Medicinal: Illegal
- Recreational: Illegal
- Hemp: Illegal

Cannabis in Kuwait is illegal for all purposes, and possession of even small amounts of the drug is a criminal offence and can result in hefty prison time and significant fines.

== Enforcement ==
Possession or personal use of cannabis can result in two years in prison plus fines. Punishment for drug-related crimes can be severe, up to and including the death penalty.

== International smuggling ==
Cannabis and other drugs are transshipped from Afghanistan through Iran, to Kuwait, then to Europe.
