= Cannabis in Monaco =

Cannabis in Monaco is illegal. The production, sale, and possession of marijuana for medicinal or recreational purposes being a criminal offense with a penalty of up to one year in jail in addition to a fine of up to €1,680. Despite the strong laws, the police and courts are often lenient, letting offenders off with a warning.

According to the World Drug Report 2011, 8.9% of the population use cannabis at least once per year.
