= Cannabis in Jordan =

- Location of Jordan (dark green)
- Medicinal: Illegal
- Recreational: Illegal

Cannabis in Jordan is illegal. In 2018, Anwar Tarawneh, Director of the Anti-Narcotics Department (AND), reported that "marijuana is the most consumed drug in Jordan", with the AND seizing 1.5 tonnes of cannabis that year. As Jordan is a signatory to the 1961 United Nations Single Convention on Narcotic Drugs.

== Legality ==
The 1988 Law on Drugs and Psychotropic Substances, which originally regulated the use of drugs in Jordan, issued harsh punishments for those caught with cannabis. In 2015, the law was amended, for the first time developing a legal difference between first-time users and repeat offenders. In 2016, a new law was passed. The Drugs and Psychotropic Substances Act of 2016 mandates the death penalty for the crime of collaborating with international gangs dealing with narcotic and/or psychotropic substances.

Jordan's drug laws make no distinction between CBD and cannabis, and the production, mail, use, sale, and distribution of both are illegal in Jordan. Additionally, Jordan's law makes no distinction between cannabis for recreational or medicinal use.

Jordan is party to all international drug control conventions, including the Single Convention on Narcotic Drugs of 1961, as amended by the 1972 Protocol, to the UN Convention on Psychotropic Substances of 1971 and to the UN Convention against Illicit Traffic in Narcotic Drugs and Psychotropic Substances of 1988. Jordan is also a party to the Unified Arab Law and a member of the Interpol, and the Organization for Social Defence against Crime and the Pall Arab Bureau for Narcotic Affairs. Jordan has also committed to several bilateral agreements providing for counter-narcotics cooperation with Syria, Lebanon, Iraq, Saudi Arabia, Turkey, Egypt, Pakistan, Israel, Iran and Hungary.

== Enforcement ==
The following 4 organizations work to prevent drug trafficking in Jordan:

- The AND (Anti-Narcotics Department)
- The Desert and Border Police (responsible for patrolling the extensive border and desert)
- The General Customs Department (responsible for general customs duties and patrol work)
- The Jordanian Armed Forces (who control part of Jordan's borders)

== History ==
In the mid-20th century, Jordan (then Trans-Jordan) was noted as a smuggling route, carrying hashish from Turkey, Iran, Lebanon, and Syria into Egypt. In 1937 the total of all drugs seized in Jordan was just 6 kilograms of hashish.

For most of the 20th century, drug laws in Jordan were strict. However, since King Abdullah II's rise to the throne, first-time cannabis users are now offered treatment instead of a prison sentence.

Jordan is generally considered a transit country for cannabis and other recreational drugs. However, in recent years, the seizures of Cannabis tripled from (444 kg) to (1478 kg) respectively between 2013 and 2018, with a 233% increase. This has been regarded by authorities as an indication of increased national drug use. Synthetic cannabis, also known locally as "Joker", is manufactured locally and consists of a combination of 14 substances. It was made illegal in 2015, under new drug laws.
