= Cannabis in Liechtenstein =

Legality of cannabis in Europe Legal for recreational use Legal for medical use Illegal

Cannabis in Liechtenstein is illegal for recreational use.

According to the World Drug Report 2011, 8.6% of the population use cannabis at least once per year. A 2016 survey of 15-16-year-old students in Liechtenstein found that 44% had easy access to cannabis.

== History ==
On 20 April 1983, the Law on Narcotics and Psychotropic Substances (German: Gesetz über die Betäubungsmittel und die psychotropen Stoffe) was passed by the Landtag. The law prohibits the cultivation, production, or sale of cannabis products with a THC content above 1%.

Since a 2005 decree spearheaded by Prince Alois, hemp has been banned for use in any means, including in feed for cattle, due to the presence of THC. Farmers claimed that the use of European hemp led to more milk being produced since the cows were calmer and less stressed.

In 2018, Free List political party toured the country touting reforms to the laws in order to relax the government's stance on cannabis, citing the financial benefits as a result of no longer enforcing the ban. Minister of Social Affairs Mauro Pedrazzini, while not explicitly rejecting the idea of liberalization, said that he wanted to wait and see the actions of surrounding countries before making a decision, advocating against the idea of cannabis experiments and saying that he did not want Liechtenstein to become a "stoner stronghold in the Rhine Valley."

As a member of the European Medicines Agency, marketing authorisation for Epidyolex was issued in September of 2019. Sativex is also authorised within the country.
