= Cannabis in Hong Kong =

- Location of Hong Kong (red)
- Medicinal: Illegal
- Recreational: Illegal

Cannabis is illegal in Hong Kong. The possession, sale, transportation, and cultivation of cannabis is prohibited under the Dangerous Drug Ordinance (Chapter 134 of the Law of Hong Kong), which was put into effect at January 17, 1969, during the British colonial period.

== Legality ==
Cannabis is listed as a Schedule 1 drug prohibited by the Dangerous Drug Ordinance, alongside others like heroin, opium, cocaine, and methamphetamine. The offenses and the maximum penalties associated with each offense are listed below:

Offenses Under the Dangerous Drug Ordinance
Section	Offense	Maximum penalty (on indictment)	Maximum penalty (summarily)
4	Trafficking, or offering to traffic, in a dangerous drug	Life, and HK$5 million fine	3 years and HK $500,000 fine
6	Manufacturing a dangerous drug	Life, and HK$500,000 fine	Not applicable
5	Possession or use of a dangerous drug	7 years and HK$1 million fine	3 years and HK$100,000 fine

=== Legal treatment of cannabis trafficking ===
"Trafficking" is defined in the Dangerous Drug Ordinance as:

"...importing into Hong Kong, exporting from Hong Kong, procuring, supplying or otherwise dealing in or with the dangerous drug, or possessing the dangerous drug for the purpose of trafficking..."

To set the length for each particular sentence, judges may look to previous cases where sentence minimums—known as tariffs—were applied, and use them as guidelines. The principal tariffs for distributing cannabis resin were suggested in Attorney-General v Chan Chi-man ([1987] HKLR 221), where it was noted that sentences should be scaled down appropriately based on the type of cannabis product being trafficked (i.e. the penalties are reduced if the product contains smaller amounts of tetrahydrocannabinol, or THC):

Tariffs for Cannabis Resin Trafficking
Quantity (g)	Sentence Range
less than 2000	up to 16 months
over 2000	16–24 months
over 3000	24–36 months
over 6000	36–48 months
over 9000	over 4 years

Other details in the case are also used to make judgments. In HKSAR v Chor Lui ([2001] 3 HKLRD 95), where the accused pleaded guilty to distributing 0.24g of herbal cannabis in a discotheque, the Court of First Instance scaled back the sentence to two months due to the amount of cannabis distributed, its lack of potency compared to cannabis resin, and in exchange for a "guilty" plea. However, the Magistrate dismissed the ability to appeal the sentence, under grounds of location and social context—the accused was selling cannabis in a place "where impressionable young people congregated, and was preying on their credibility".

While the court tends to reduce the initial sentence based on cannabis potency and amount, it acknowledges that any role in the trafficking of a Schedule 1 drug should be taken seriously. For example, in R v Chan Shu Tong ([1996] 4 HKC 515), the accused admitted to storing 790 kg of cannabis being trafficked in a rented flat, under orders from his employer. From a starting point of 30 years, the judge settled on a sentence of 18 years for the accused. During the appeal process, the Court of Appeal upheld the original decision, stating that while the accused did not benefit from the trafficking operation, their participation in storing the cannabis was still significant.

=== Legality of Cannabinoids ===
Schedule 1 lists THC illegal. CBD is also illegal in Hong Kong.

== Usage and attitudes ==
While using and growing cannabis remains illegal, there have been reports of greater cannabis arrests and seizures over the years. In 2016, cannabis seizures by Hong Kong police increased by over 95% to 255 kg, up from 130 kg in 2015. According to the Narcotics Division of the Security Bureau, in 2016, cannabis was reported to be used by 5% of all psychotropic substance abusers in Hong Kong.

The first cannabis investment symposium in Hong Kong was held in November 2018 targeting new cannabis investment opportunities for Hong Kong investors in an emerging new industry with the support of the HKSAR government.

There have also been reports of synthetic cannabinoid usage in Hong Kong, which was not common before 2010.
