= Cannabis in French Guiana =

Cannabis in French Guiana is illegal, but is illicitly cultivated and transported.

== Economy ==
In the 1980s and 1990s it was reported that cannabis grown in Brazil was smuggled to Cayenne and French Guiana.

== Usage ==
A 2007 report noted that use of cannabis by youth in French Guiana was at 6%.

While mainland France has begun limited medical cannabis programmes under state-supervised trials, these are narrowly regulated and do not constitute broad legal access for most patients in French Guiana.
