= Cannabis in the Republic of the Congo =

- Location of the Republic of the Congo (dark green)
- Medicinal: Illegal
- Recreational: Illegal

Cannabis in the Republic of the Congo is illegal. Cannabis is known locally as mbanga.

== History ==
As early as 1959, the year prior to independence from France, cannabis was noted growing throughout Congo, particularly in Pool Prefecture. The market appeared to have increased in that period, leasing farmers to grow cannabis in cassava plots.

During the conflicts of the 1990s, militias controlled cannabis plantations around Brazzaville and Dolisie.
