= Cannabis in Bahrain =

Cannabis in Bahrain is illegal. Bahrain's laws forbid the cultivation, sale, and possession of cannabis for recreational purposes. Additionally, the production, sale and possession of any form of medicinal marijuana products is also criminalized, with heavy penalties.

== Use ==
A 2000 report by UNODC estimated the prevalence of adult use of cannabis in Bahrain to be between .1-.4%.

== Enforcement ==
In 2014 a Bahraini citizen was arrested for growing cannabis plants at his house, and possessing 767 grams of hashish. He was convicted of possessing and growing cannabis, though not of trafficking it since no evidence of sale was found, and sentenced to 12 months in jail and fined BD1,000.
