= Cannabis in the Gambia =

Cannabis in The Gambia is illegal.

It is known locally as yamba or tie and is the most used illegal drug in the country.
