= Cannabis in Somalia =

Cannabis is present in Somalia, and noted in the Somali 1971 penal code. Reports in 1970 and 1971 note that it is one of the few narcotic drugs found there, other than the locally very popular khat leaf.

== Somali Civil War ==
As early as 1996, the Nairobi Standard reported that Somali warlords were cultivating cannabis to support military operations, amounting to annual harvests of 160 tons worth US$272 million.

A 2007 study of use of drugs by combatants in the Somali War noted that the most commonly used drug was khat, with 70.1% of respondents having used it in the previous week, compared with 10.7% for smoking cannabis and 0.6% for eating hemp seeds.

A 2008 Al Jazeera report, following Al-Shabaab's seizing of the port city of Kismayo, noted that three local men were arrested for possession of hashish, and their supply was burned and they were publicly flogged by the militants.

A 2013 study noted "persistent reports" of small-scale cannabis production for export in southern Somalia.
