= Cannabis in Iraq =

- Location of Iraq (dark green)
- Medicinal: Illegal
- Recreational: Illegal

Cannabis is illegal in Iraq.

== History ==
Cannabis was allegedly introduced to Iraq in 1230 CE during the reign of Caliph Al-Mustansir Bi'llah by the entourage of Bahraini rulers visiting Iraq. However, it was likely used by the people of Mesopotamia as early as the late Bronze Age.
