= Cannabis in Burundi =

Cannabis in Burundi is illegal.

== History ==
A 1977 United States Congressional report noted that cannabis in Burundi was illegal, with cultivation, transport, or possession punishable by fines of 100–100,000 francs, though rarely enforced. It noted too that cannabis was sometimes called chanvre a fumer in regional French by older and poorer elements of the population.
