= Cannabis in Eritrea =

Cannabis in Eritrea is illegal with severe penalties for the production, sale, and possession of marijuana for medicinal or recreational purposes.The country has some of the strictest drug laws in the world. Possession, sale, distribution, and cultivation of cannabis are all prohibited, with severe legal consequences for those caught violating these laws. Personal marijuana use, purchase, and possession are considered lesser offenses than drug trafficking and have somewhat reduced penalties. Within Eritrea, although it has been noted that there may be no legal framework, there is a penal code [1] . Eritrea also bans the usage of Mswaki, which is a plant that, when chewed, releases stimulating chemicals that imitate a euphoric effect.

Cannabis Enforcement in Eritrea

Due to strict government control and limited available data, there is little information on cannabis consumption rates in Eritrea.Drug enforcement is severe, and Eritrea's security forces have been known to crack down on any suspected drug activity.Eritrea’s government has also been known to take a harsh stance on any foreign influence or liberalization regarding drug laws.

Offenders are imprisoned up to twelve months and fined up to 50'000 Nkf for possession, equivalent to $3,333 USD. Conditions for cultivation in Eritrea are poor.

Following Eritrea's independence, the country became a transit point for drug trafficking, similar to other nations in East Africa. Cannabis originating from Southwest and Southeast Asia is often smuggled through Djibouti before being transported to various destinations across Africa, the Middle East, and Europe. The region's strategic location along key maritime and land trade routes has contributed to its role in the movement of illicit substances. While Eritrea itself maintains strict anti-drug policies, traffickers exploit the country's borders and ports for transit purposes.

Like other countries in East Africa, Eritrea is used as a drug trafficking hub. Cannabis from Southwest and Southeast Asia is transferred through Djibouti to other countries in Africa, Asia, and Europe. This began soon after Eritrea's independence, when young Eritrean nationals, raised in Europe and North America, returned to their country and introduced drugs into the newly developing society.

== History ==
Cannabis leaves are sometimes used in Eritrean folk medicine.

While some neighboring countries, such as Ethiopia, have a history of traditional cannabis use (e.g., dagga or khat, though khat is a different stimulant plant), Eritrea does not have the same cultural ties to cannabis.Unlike other parts of Africa where cannabis reform is gaining traction, Eritrea remains one of the most prohibitive countries when it comes to drug policy.

Under Italian rule, hemp was cultivated in Eritrea.
