= Cannabis in Mauritius =

Cannabis in Mauritius is illegal; locally it is known as gandia.

== Local cannabis varieties ==
A distinctive local cannabis variety known as Zamal is traditionally associated with both Mauritius and the neighboring island of Réunion. Zamal is considered a 100% sativa landrace, characterized by its long flowering period and exceptional resistance to tropical humidity. It has been cultivated for generations in remote rural areas, often used for spiritual, medicinal, and recreational purposes.

Although largely undocumented in academic literature, Zamal is well known among local growers and collectors in the Indian Ocean region. Its genetics are valued in breeding projects for their vigor, mold resistance, and energetic psychoactive effects.

== History ==
Cannabis was banned in the British colony of Mauritius in 1840:

Whereas it results from the reports made to the Governor that a plant or herb commonly called and known by the name of Gandia (cannabis indiae [sic]) is daily imported and openly sold in the Colony, to a considerable extent, the use of which, being carried to excess among the labouring class, is productive of the most pernicious effects, often exciting them to disorderly conduct and in some cases causing death;

It therefore becomes urgent that prompt and efficient measures be resorted to for preventing abuses of so grave a nature;

== Usage ==
A 1974 report on addiction noted that cannabis was usually smoked in cigarette rolls or clay pipes. Other alternative was to mix them into cakes or sweets, or the beverage bhang. It was rarely sniffed as snuff because "it burns the nose".

== Reform ==
In February 1999, a rally was held calling for legalization of cannabis. The famed Mauritian musician Kaya performed, and publicly smoked cannabis at the event. He was detained by police, and four days later died in custody.
