= Cannabis in the Dominican Republic =

- Location of Dominican Republic (dark green)
- Medicinal: Illegal
- Recreational: Illegal

Cannabis is illegal in the Dominican Republic.

== Law ==
On May 30, 1988, the Congress of the Dominican Republic approved Law 50-88 dealing with narcotics. Under this law, the possession of any quantity of cannabis is a punishable offense, categorized according to the quantity of the drug found in their possession.

== Sentences for possession ==
Accused persons are grouped into one of three legal categories depending on the amount of drugs found in their possession. Penalties correspond to each of the three categories and are currently fixed. Saw

=== Category one: 20 grams or less ===
For those guilty of possessing 20 grams or less, the minimum sentence is six months in prison and a fine of $2,500 Dominican pesos.

=== Category two: 20 grams to one pound ===
For those guilty of possessing between 20 grams and one pound, the minimum sentence is three years in prison and a fine of $10,000 Dominican pesos, with a maximum sentence of ten years in prison and a fine of $50,000 Dominican pesos.

=== Category three: More than one pound ===
Those found guilty of possessing more than one pound are considered traffickers. The minimum sentence is five years in prison and a fine of $50,000 Dominican pesos, with a maximum sentence of twenty years in prison. Traffickers must pay a fine of no lesser value than the value of the seized controlled drugs or involvement in the operation, but in no instance less than $50,000 Dominican pesos.
