= Cannabis in Iran =

- Location of Iran (dark green)
- Medicinal: Illegal
- Recreational: Illegal

Cannabis is illegal in Iran, but the law is often not strictly enforced. The use of cannabis has become increasingly popular in Iranian cities according to various reports, although the government does not keep official usage statistics.

In 1989 the Iranian government enacted a law providing the death penalty for possession of hashish in excess of five kilograms.

== History ==
The popularization of cannabis is apocryphally attributed to Sheikh Haydar (d. 1221 CE), a Sufi saint who lived in Khurasan province of what is now Iran.

The Scythians would ritually inhale cannabis for the purposes of intoxication.

== Reform ==
In 2015, Saeed Sefatian, who leads the working group on drug demand reduction within the Council for the Discernment of the Expediency of the State (or Expediency Council) presented a lecture outlining steps towards legalizing cannabis.
