= Cannabis in Tanzania =

- Location of Tanzania (dark green)
- Medicinal: Illegal
- Recreational: Illegal

Cannabis, known locally as bhang (Swahili: bangi), is prohibited for medicinal and recreational use in Tanzania. As of 2026, possession or use of large amounts of cannabis is punishable with one to five years of imprisonment. Tanzania is one among multiple countries in Africa that produce cannabis in large quantities.

== History ==
Cannabis may have been introduced to the Swahili coast by about 1000 AD, presumably by Hindi-, Persian-, or Arabic-speaking traders. By the 19th century, cannabis was part of the folk medicine of many cultures in East Africa and long-distance trade arose. Cannabis grown by the Ngoni people was taken to Kilwa. During the German colonial period, small-scale Nyamwezi traders transported cannabis from Unyamwezi to the coast and Zanzibar. Sparse accounts during this period suggest that in East Africa the plant was primarily a smoked drug. As cannabis trade in Africa developed, European colonial administrations increasingly suppressed it, viewing its use as a hindrance to their colonial objectives.

== Modern use ==
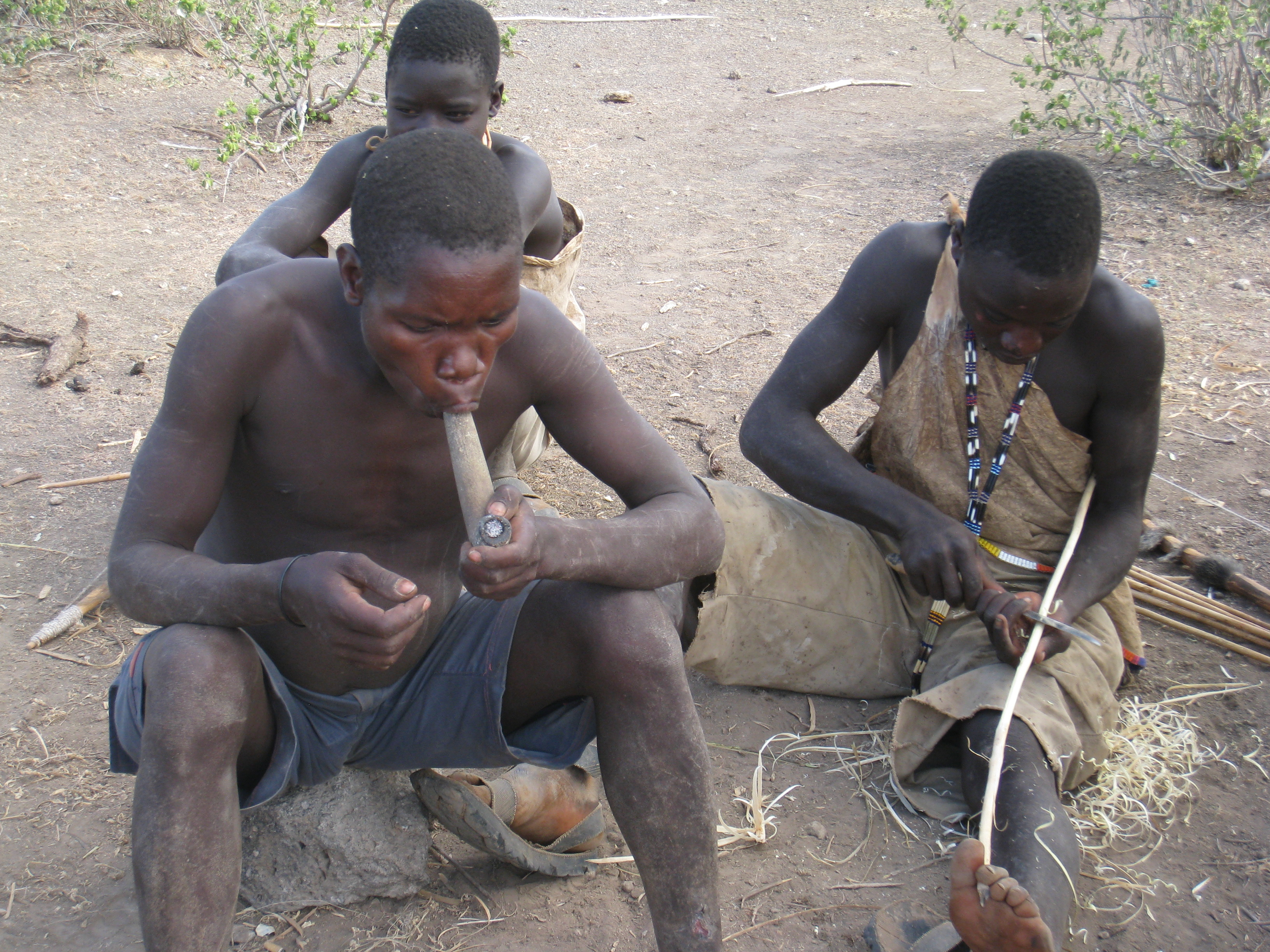
A Hadza person smoking cannabis in Tanzania

Cannabis in Tanzania is cultivated in coastal zone of Tanga, northern zone of Arusha, Manyara and Kilimanjaro, southern highland of Iringa and Lake Zone of Shinyanga and Mara Cannabis is mainly produced in rural areas. It takes four to five months for cannabis to mature. Cannabis is also imported from outside the country, and the main entry is in the airport of Dar es salaam, Kilimanjaro International airport (KIA) and the seaport of Dar es salaam and Zanzibar and small airports like Tanga and Mwanza. A 2023 chemical profiling study reported that over 10,219 kilograms of cannabis were seized in Tanzania between 2011 and 2016, confirming its role as a major producer in East Africa.

In rural areas, cannabis is used to treat ailments like earaches, fevers and malaria. The leaves are used to make and prepare food.

Recent analysis has noted the continued role of cannabis in Tanzania's rural economy and traditional practices, despite legal prohibition. A 2023 study identified regional variations in the chemical composition of seized cannabis, with the Pwani region exhibiting the highest Δ9-THC concentration at 13.45%. Reports also describe informal use of cannabis in traditional medicine and rural food preparation, particularly in areas where access to formal healthcare remains limited.

== Legal status ==
Under the Drug Control and Enforcement Act (CAP. 95) and the Tanzanian Food, Drugs and Cosmetics Act (CAP. 219), the medicinal and recreational use of cannabis in Tanzania is banned. Possession or use of small quantities of the drug (< 50 g of the plant; < 5 g of resin) is punishable with a large fine. Possession or use of large quantities is punishable with one to five years of imprisonment. The responsible regulatory authority is the Drug Control and Enforcement Authority.

=== Legalisation ===
Kahama Urban MP Jumanne Kishimba advocated in parliament for the legalisation of cannabis for medicinal use in 2019.

== See also ==
- Cannabis by country
- Cannabis sativa
