= Cannabis in Eswatini =

Traditional crop known as "insangu"

Cannabis in Eswatini (Swaziland) is a traditional crop called insangu in Swazi. The plant is subject to drug control and remains illegal in almost all cases.

The local traditional plant variety (Cannabis strain) is known as "Swazi gold"; it is often bioprospected and commands a high price due to its reputation for potency, making it a genetic resource at risk of biopiracy.

== History and Culture ==
=== History ===
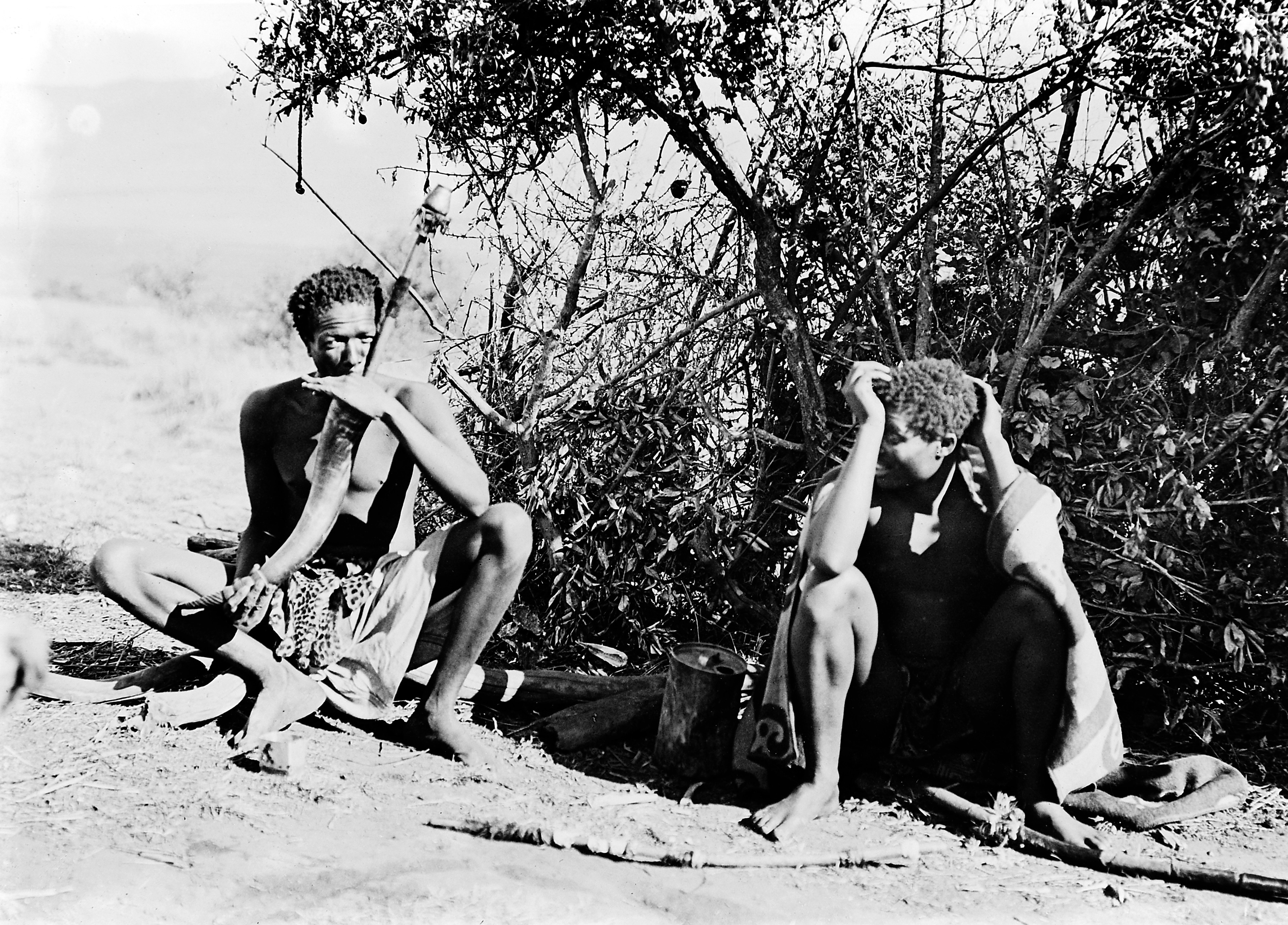
"Swaziland; two young men seated, one of them smoking hemp" (Wellcome Collections)

Arrived centuries ago, Cannabis has a long history in eSwatini, with early archaeological evidence dating back around 1200 CE after Arab merchants brought the plant from Asia.

==== Culture ====
Besides being illicit, Cannabis remains widely grown in the country, and used for a variety of purposes. In 2006, a report of the United Nations Office on Drugs and Crime recognized eSwatini as one of the major producers in Southern Africa.

==== Illicit trade ====
Reportedly, Nigerian criminal syndicates are involved in the trade, with the best-quality cannabis being sent to Europe via South Africa and Mozambique.

== Legislation ==
=== Reform ===
In 2017, a group of Members of Parliament announced that legalizing cannabis in eSwatini could add US$1.63 billion to the economy, potentially tripling the Gross Domestic Product.
