= Cannabis in Sudan =

- Location of Sudan (dark green)
- Medicinal: Illegal
- Recreational: Illegal

Cannabis in Sudan is illegal. The drug was banned in 1924 during the Condominium Period of Anglo-Egyptian Sudan.

“According to the General Office for Combating Drugs in Khartoum, Sudan is the largest producer of cannabis in Africa. The Office reported on Friday that most of the cannabis is cultivated in South Darfur’s El Radoom locality.

The drug trade in Sudan exceeded $7 billion last year, while the use of cannabis grew by 34 percent, especially among university students and other young people between 18 and 22 years old.”
