= Cannabis in Angola =

Cannabis is illegal in Angola. The drug is locally referred to as diamba or liamba.

British explorer David Livingstone wrote in 1858: "The Portuguese in Angola have such a belief in its deleterious effects that the use of it by a slave is considered a crime." Cannabis is the most common illicit drug in Angola, and is grown in almost every province of the country.
