= Cannabis in Montserrat =

Cannabis in Montserrat, the British Overseas Territory in the Caribbean Leeward Islands, is illegal under British law.

In 1994, Montserrat seized 3 kg (7 lb) of cannabis and destroyed 240,600 cannabis plants.

Montserrat has no drug testing facilities, neither in its prison nor in civil society, but use of Class A drugs is minimal, with the island's drug issues largely confined to cannabis.

Black the Ripper was a notable Montserratian who advocated for the rights of Cannabis use during his life and died in 2020.
