= Cannabis in Gibraltar =

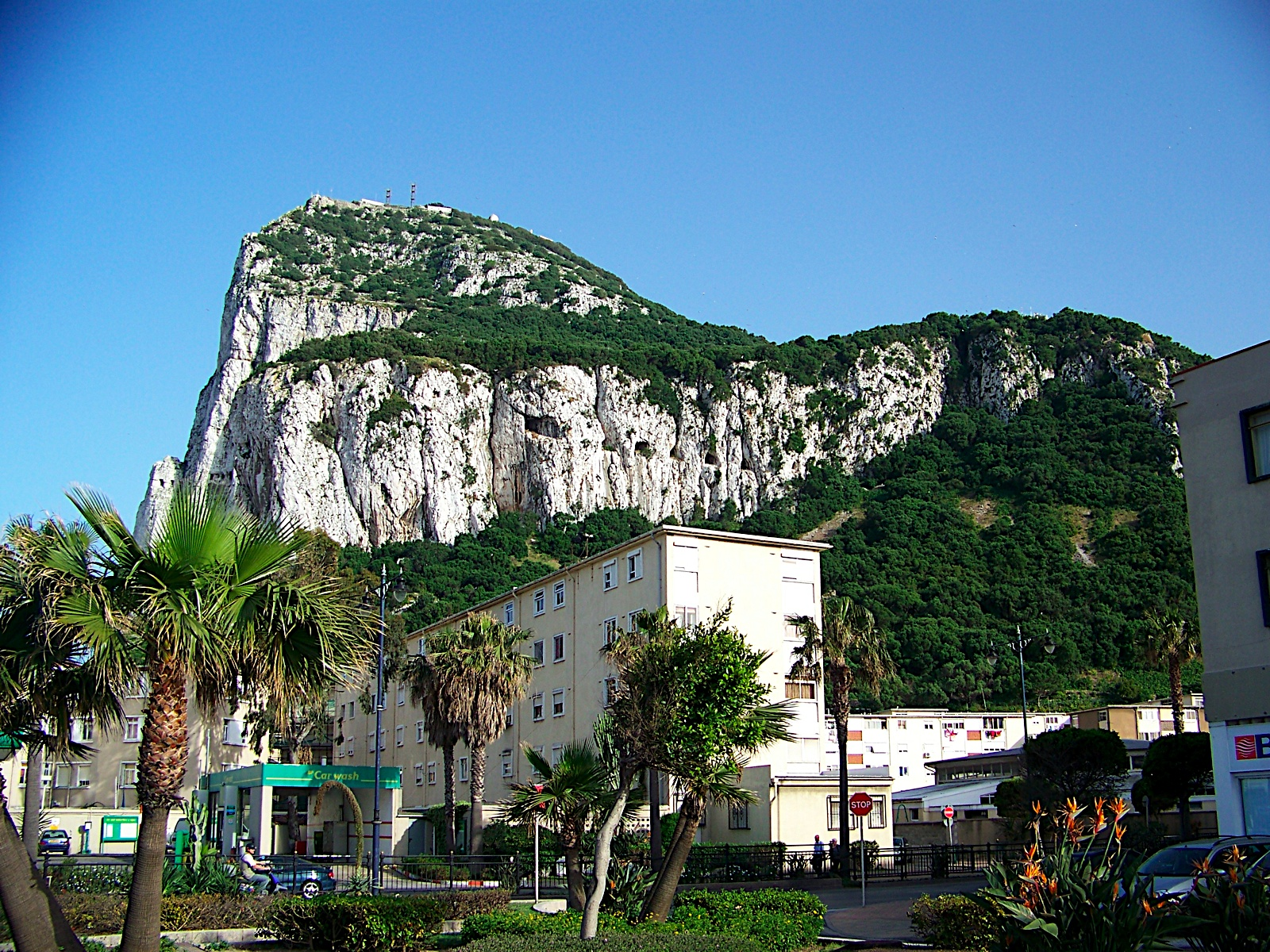
Rock of Gibraltar from Bayside Road, Gibraltar

Cannabis in Gibraltar is illegal, but due to its proximity to North Africa and to mainland Europe, the area around Gibraltar in Spain (Campo de Gibraltar) is frequently used for cannabis trafficking. Gibraltar itself is not a usual destination for drug smuggling from Morocco as it only has a small population and customs controls with Spain make it difficult to move the merchandise further on into Europe. Gibraltarian authorities take a hard line on drug smuggling and prohibited the use of fast speed boats in its waters in 1995, a measure introduced by Spain in 2018.

== Trafficking ==
Prior to 1957, cannabis trafficking in the area around Gibraltar was limited to small personal amounts by tourists, but with the arrival of the Hippie Trail, larger amounts began to be commercially smuggled, leading the Campo de Gibraltar to become one of the main entry points to Europe for Moroccan hashish. in 2018, Spanish authorities confiscated 191 tons of cannabis and 15.5 tons of cocaine in the Spanish Campo de Gibraltar area. The corresponding figures for cannabis seizures in 2017 are 145 tons and for 2016 100 tons.

== Medical cannabis ==
In 2017, Gibraltar legalised Sativex oral spray to treat Multiple Sclerosis. In October 2019, Gibraltar published an amendment to the drugs misuse regulations in order to provide for the supply and possession of certain cannabis-based products for medicinal use in limited circumstances.
