= Cannabis in Tuvalu =

- Location of Tuvalu (red)
- Medicinal: Illegal
- Recreational: Illegal

Cannabis in Tuvalu is illegal with severe punishments for the production, sale, and possession of marijuana for medicinal or recreational purposes. Due to the nation's high development index, illegal substance abuse effectively does not exist in Tuvalu and there were no reports of drug-related crimes on Tuvalu in 2019 or 2020.

Tuvalu, like other island nations in the West Pacific is utilised as a staging point in the illicit drug trade, between South East Asia and Australasia.
