= Cannabis in Cameroon =

Cannabis in Cameroon is illegal; the drug is locally referred to as banga.

== Medical usage ==
In Cameroon, women traditionally crushed cannabis leaves and applied them to the abdomen to relieve the pains of women in labor, inserted cannabis into the vagina to make their mucus layers more juicy and mixed cannabis with oil as a hair tonic to stimulate growth.

In 2001, the BBC reported that Cameroon would legalize medicinal cannabis, but import its supply from Canada.

== Trafficking ==
Douala Airport and Yaoundé Airport in Cameroon served as transit hubs for cannabis export to Europe, both locally produced cannabis as well as products from DRC and Nigeria.
