= Cannabis in the Comoros =

Cannabis in Comoros is currently illegal as of September 2019. Between January 1975 and May 1978, cannabis in Comoros was legal, legalized by president Ali Soilih.

The cultivation, sale, and possession of cannabis for recreational purposes are illegal in Comoros.
