= Cannabis in Equatorial Guinea =

- Location of Equatorial Guinea (dark green)
- Medicinal: Illegal
- Recreational: Illegal

Cannabis in Equatorial Guinea is illegal with severe penalties for the production, sale, and possession of marijuana for medicinal or recreational purposes. Despite the illegality, smoking marijuana remains culturally popular among all strata of society, and it was reported in 2000 that no one has been arrested for smoking or dealing cannabis in living memory.

Cannabis is cultivated in Equatorial Guinea, with some product being trafficked to Gabon via the Muni River.

== History ==
Historically, cannabis was used in Equatorial Guinea only for ceremonial purposes.

President Francisco Macías Nguema (1968–1979) was said to have used cannabis in its edible bhang form, which critics say along with his mental condition and use of iboga was a factor in the violence of his regime. His critics also alleged he encouraged the growing of cannabis over other, needed, crops.
