= Cannabis in Guyana =

Cannabis in Guyana is illegal for all uses, but is both grown and consumed in the nation. Possession of 15 grams or more can result in charges of drug trafficking.

== History ==
=== Indian community ===
As in other parts of the British Caribbean, arriving indentured labourers from India brought the custom of smoking ganja with them, but this habit had fallen from fashion by the early part of the 20th century.

=== Early legislation ===
In 1861, British Guiana passed a law entitled An Ordinance to Regulate the Sale of Opium and Bhang.

=== Indian Hemp Ordinance ===
British Guiana passed its Indian Hemp Ordinance in 1913.

=== Rastafarian usage ===
In the 1970s, the Rastafari philosophy gained popularity in Guyana, and along with it came an increased interest in cannabis. In 2015, Guyanese Rastafarians staged a demonstration at the Attorney General's office calling for the decriminalization of cannabis, spurred by the recent arrest of former football star Vibert Butts.

== Prevalence ==
The 2006 UN World Drug Report estimated that 2.6% of Guyanese age 15-64 had used cannabis that year, and as of 2009 it was reported as the most prevalent drug in the country.

== Production ==
Cannabis is generally sold within Guyana, rather than trafficked abroad. Its cannabis grows year-round, and is of a high grade, but is largely consumed locally rather than exported.

== Enforcement ==
Anti-cannabis operations are conducted by both the drug enforcement unit (founded in 1975) of the Guyana Police Force and by the Guyana Defence Force.

In 1987, a Guyanese Member of Parliament was arrested in Fort Lauderdale, Florida, for possession and sale of cannabis.
