= Cannabis in the Cook Islands =

- Location of the Cook Islands (red)
- Medicinal: Legal
- Recreational: Illegal

Cannabis in the Cook Islands is illegal for recreational purposes. A non-binding referendum to legalise it for medicinal purposes passed with 62% in 2022, and medicinal cannabis became legal on 2 July 2024.

In 2010, Cook Islands Police and New Zealand Police launched Operation Eagle, arresting the son of a prominent local politician, and two former police officers.
