= Cannabis in Russia =

- Location of Russia (dark green)
- Medicinal: Illegal
- Recreational: Illegal

Legality of cannabis in Europe Legal for recreational use Legal for medical use Illegal

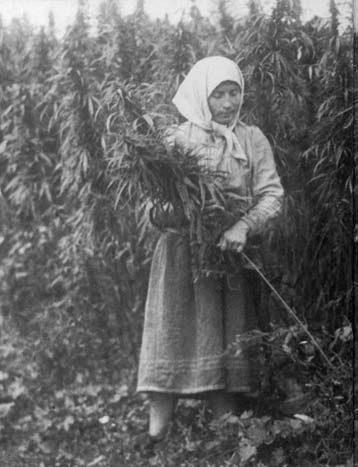
Hemp harvesting, USSR 1956

Cannabis is illegal in Russia. Possession of up to 6 grams (or two grams of hashish) is an administrative offense, punishable by a fine or detention of 15 days. Possession of larger amounts is a criminal offense.

== History ==
=== Industrial hemp ===
At the end of the 19th century, cannabis cultivation for fiber was one of the main sources of revenue of the peasants of Orel, Kaluga, Kursk, Chernigov, Mogilev and partly Minsk provinces of the Russian Empire. According to the Russian Brockhaus and Efron Encyclopedic Dictionary, about 140 thousand tons of hemp were produced annually in the European part of the Russian Empire at the end of the 19th century, which accounted for about 40% of the production of hemp in Europe.

During dekulakization, large farms engaged in cannabis cultivation were fragmented into small (0.1-0.15 ha) plots, handling and capable of satisfying only domestic needs. A report at the beginning of the 1930s stated: "the cannabis industry of agriculture in the Middle Volga region, as well as in other cannabis regions of the USSR, is in a state of decline," seen in "shrinking of acreage, low yields, reduction in the commodity share of gross collections."

The Great Soviet Encyclopedia of 1937 reported:

The socialist reconstruction of agriculture has dramatically changed the face of backward cannabis cultivation in the USSR. The unfolding Stakhanov movement in agriculture, in particular among the cannabis growers, provided higher yields of cannabis. 14.03. In 1936 a special meeting of the leaders of the party and government was held with the leaders in flax and hemp. A number of Stakhanovite-carpet-weavers were awarded orders of the Union. After 1934 the cannabis crops began to recover, and if in 1934 the cannabis sown area was 598,000 hectares, then its crops in 1936 occupied 680,000 hectares, amounting to 4/5 of the world's total area under cannabis. A decree of the Council of People's Commissars of the USSR and the Central Committee of the CPSU (b.) (March 1934) granted special privileges and advantages for hemp crops on homesteads, backyards and floodplains. Preparation of hemp fiber from cannabis in the USSR in 1933-34 reached 39.4 thousand tons and in 1934-35. - 44,9 thousand tons; production of hemp oil (from seeds) in the USSR in 1933 amounted to 5.0 thousand tons, and in 1934 - 6.3 thousand tons.

=== Drug usage ===
Entering the 20th century, use of cannabis (largely as hashish) was confined to Russia's colonial acquisitions in Central Asia. In 1909, I. S. Levitov produced a pamphlet based on his studies in that region, noting that locals had used cannabis for six centuries or more, and that Russian colonists and cossacks had acquired the habit from the locals.

In 1926 and 1928, the Soviet Union produced some of its earliest regulations to prevent "narcomania", focused on cocaine and morphine, but it was in 1934 that it banned the unauthorized cultivation of cannabis and opium poppy. A direct ban on the illegal sowing or cultivation of Indian hemp was introduced by Article 225 of the RSFSR Criminal Code of 1960, while hemp continued to occupy a significant place in the total volume of agricultural production. While cannabis had been long used in Central Asia, it was not until the 1960s that the issue received much attention from the Soviet government due to increased press coverage of drug use.

In modern Russia, per the Ministry of Internal Affairs, 93% of the nation's marijuana comes from Kazakhstan.

== Cultivation ==
A 1914 USDA report noted:

Hemp is cultivated throughout the greater part of Russia, and it is one of the principal crops in the provinces of Orel, Kursk, Samara, Smolensk, Tula, Voronezh, and Poland. Two distinct types, similar to the tall fiber hemp and the short oilseed hemp of Manchuria, are cultivated, and there are doubtless many local varieties in isolated districts where there is a little interchange of seed. The crop is rather crudely cultivated, with no attempt at seed selection or improvement, and the plants are generally shorter and coarser than the hemp grown in Kentucky. The short oilseed hemp with slender stems, about 30 inches high, bearing compact clusters of seeds and maturing in 60 to 90 days, is of little value for fiber production, but the experimental plants, grown from seed imported from Russia, indicate that it may be valuable as an oil-seed crop to be harvested and thrashed in the same manner as oilseed flax.

== Penalties ==
In 2004 the drug policy of Russia was liberalized. For various drugs, the amount that individuals could possess without facing criminal charges was revised upwards. In particular, the possession limit for cannabis was set at 20 grams, so that less than this amount would be only an administrative offense with no threat of jail time. Previously, possessing even a single cannabis joint qualified as a criminal offense.

In 2006 Russian policy reversed again to lower the possession limits for various drugs, with the criminal limit for cannabis going from 20 g to 6 g. Less than 6 grams qualified as an administrative offense punishable by a 5000 ruble fine or 15 days detention.

The following penalties apply to conviction for large-scale possession:

- Fine of 40,000 rubles.
- 480 hours of compulsory labor or 2 years of corrective labor.
- Up to three years in prison or restricted freedom.

In August 2022, the American basketball player Brittney Griner was sentenced to nine years in prison for smuggling 0.7 grams of cannabis oil into Russia in her luggage in February 2022. She was released in December 2022 in exchange for Russian arms dealer Viktor Bout.

Another American citizen, Marc Fogel, was sentenced to 14 years in prison in June 2022 for smuggling 14 vape cartridges and a small amount of cannabis flower into Russia in August 2021.

In 2024, a German was arrested at Saint Petersburg Pulkovo Airport after Russian customs found gummy bear sweets containing cannabis in his luggage. Even small amounts of cannabis in this case can result in up to 7 years in prison.
