= Cannabis in Egypt =

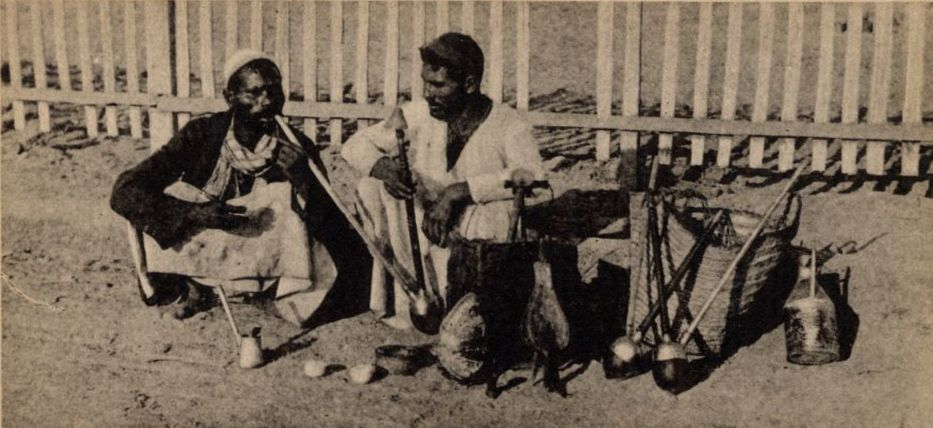
A postcard titled "Egyptian Types e Scenes. – "Hashishe Smokers"

Cannabis use is illegal in Egypt; however, it is widely used privately and informally tolerated in some regions. Law enforcement is often lax when it comes to cannabis smokers, and its use is a part of the common culture for many people in Egypt. However, large-scale smuggling of cannabis is punishable by death, while penalties for possessing even small amounts can also be severe. Despite this, these laws are not enforced in many parts of Egypt, where cannabis is often consumed openly in local cafes.

== History ==
Evidence has suggested that cannabis has been present in Egypt since circa 3000 BC. However, whether or not it was used for psychoactive purposes during this time has not been documented. It was stated in a book written in 1980 that cannabis cultivation has occurred in Egypt for "almost a thousand years". During this time, cannabis was used for making rope and it was also cultivated for use as a drug. Cannabis has been utilized in Egypt for hashish production for at least the last "eight or nine centuries".

It has been stated that hashish was introduced to Egypt by "mystic Islamic travelers" from Syria sometime during the Ayyubid dynasty in the 12th century AD. Hashish consumption by Egyptian Sufis has been documented as occurrent in the thirteenth century AD, and a unique type of cannabis referred to as Indian hemp was also documented during this time. At this time, the Indian hemp was described as having been called hashishab, as only been seen (by the writer) in Egypt, and as having been grown in gardens. Enforcement against cannabis dates back as early as around the 14th century, when cannabis users in Egypt could be punished by having their teeth pulled out. David ben Solomon ibn Abi Zimra recorded (c. 1525) that "they eat cannabis leaves in Egypt, and are inebriated thereby, and they say that it makes one happy. They eat it raw and plain, and in some places they also use it like linen to make garments."

=== French period ===
In the 18th century, a French army officer wrote that due to the use of hashish “the mass of [Egypt’s] male population is in a perpetual state of stupor!” During Napoléon Bonaparte's invasion of Egypt in 1798, alcohol was not available per Egypt being an Islamic country. In lieu of alcohol, Bonaparte's troops resorted to trying hashish, which they found to their liking. As a result of the conspicuous consumption of hashish by the troops, the smoking of hashish and consumption of drinks containing it was banned in October 1800, although the troops mostly ignored the order. Subsequently, beverages containing hashish were banned in Egyptian cafes; cafes that sold them were shut down and "boarded up", and their proprietors were jailed. During this time, hashish imported from other countries was destroyed by burning. Upon the end of the occupation in 1801, French troops brought supplies of hashish with them back to France.

=== Ottoman period ===
In 1877, the Ottoman government in Constantinople mandated that all hashish in Egypt be destroyed, and in 1879 importation of cannabis was banned by the Khedivate of Egypt.

=== British period ===
In 1887 the British occupied Egypt, which remained nominally an autonomous Ottoman province but de facto British controlled. Soon after the Egyptian government issued an 1884 ban on cultivation, though officials were permitted to confiscate and export captured hashish rather than destroy it. Despite these measures, production and sale of cannabis continued, with authorities routinely shutting down premises where cannabis was consumed, into the 20th century.

== Economy ==
Cannabis is grown throughout the year in the Sinai Peninsula and in Upper Egypt. The trade is largely focused in Sinai, and the area has been the main target of eradication efforts, with 7 million cannabis plants (along with 10.3 million opium plants) eradicated there in 1994.

== Cannabis culture ==
In 1800, French troops in Egypt noted that the Muslim locals both smoked the "seeds" of the hemp plant, as well as making a beverage from hemp. A number of cannabis preparations combined with other psychoactive plants have been recorded in Egypt, including “bosa” (cannabis combined with bearded darnel) and a waterpipe smoking blend combined with henbane. The gozah is the traditional Egyptian water-pipe; a 1980 Egyptian study noted that smoking was the most popular method of cannabis consumption (89.4% of those surveyed), with the majority of smokers using the water-pipe. A 1925 report noted that hashish that is "mixed with sugar and cooked with butter and flavoring, is made into the candy known in Egypt as manzul, maagun, and garawish".
