= Cannabis in Benin =

Cannabis is illegal in Benin. The country is not a major drug producer or consumer, but increasingly serves as a transshipment point for drugs produced elsewhere. Cannabis is the only drug produced locally in Benin, though mostly on a small scale.

== History ==
The Encyclopedia of Drug Policy noted in 2011 that over the past two decades, sale of cannabis had increasingly fallen under the control of organized crime syndicates operating regionally, particularly from Nigeria. Porto-Novo emerged as a particular transit point, given its proximity to Nigeria which allowed collaboration with Yoruba smugglers.

== Enforcement ==
In 2006, Benin seized 82 kilograms of cannabis. In 2021, the number rose to 2,444 kilograms.
