= Cannabis in Madagascar =

- Location of Madagascar (dark green)
- Medicinal: Illegal
- Recreational: Illegal

Cannabis in Madagascar is illegal, but is produced and consumed domestically.

== Terminology ==
Terms for cannabis in the Malagasy language include rangani and zamal, with the latter term being popular on Réunion, though possibly originating in Madagascar and being re-diffused there by Reunionese workers.

== History ==
The discovery of cannabis pollen dating back two millennia on Madagascar has been cited as one of the points of evidence for the first arrival of the Malagasy people on the island.

Local usage of cannabis was reported by foreign visitors in the 1700s and 1800s, and under King Andrianampoinimerina consuming cannabis was made a capital crime. Cannabis use was rife amongst his courtiers, and the king decried the practice saying: "when you smoke hemp, you become half-witted... You smoke the long leaves and take leave of your senses; it is because of this I do not want it."

== Economy ==
Cannabis produced in Madagascar is primarily for local consumption, where it is described as "ubiquitous", with some limited export to neighboring African countries. Cannabis is largely grown in the provinces of Mahajanga and Antsiranana in the north, and Tulear and Fianarantsoa in the south. Some of the types of cannabis cultivated in Madagascar are "wild varieties".

== Legality ==
Cannabis is illegal in Madagascar, though widely used. Given its illegality, the plant Huperzia obtusifolia is sometimes used as a substitute, whether smoked or in infusions.
