= Cannabis in Haiti =

- Location of Haiti (dark green)
- Medicinal: Illegal
- Recreational: Illegal

Cannabis in Haiti is illegal with severe punishments for the production, sale, and possession of marijuana for medicinal or recreational purposes.

According to the World Drug Report 2011, 1.4% of the population uses cannabis at least once per year.
