= Cannabis in Tunisia =

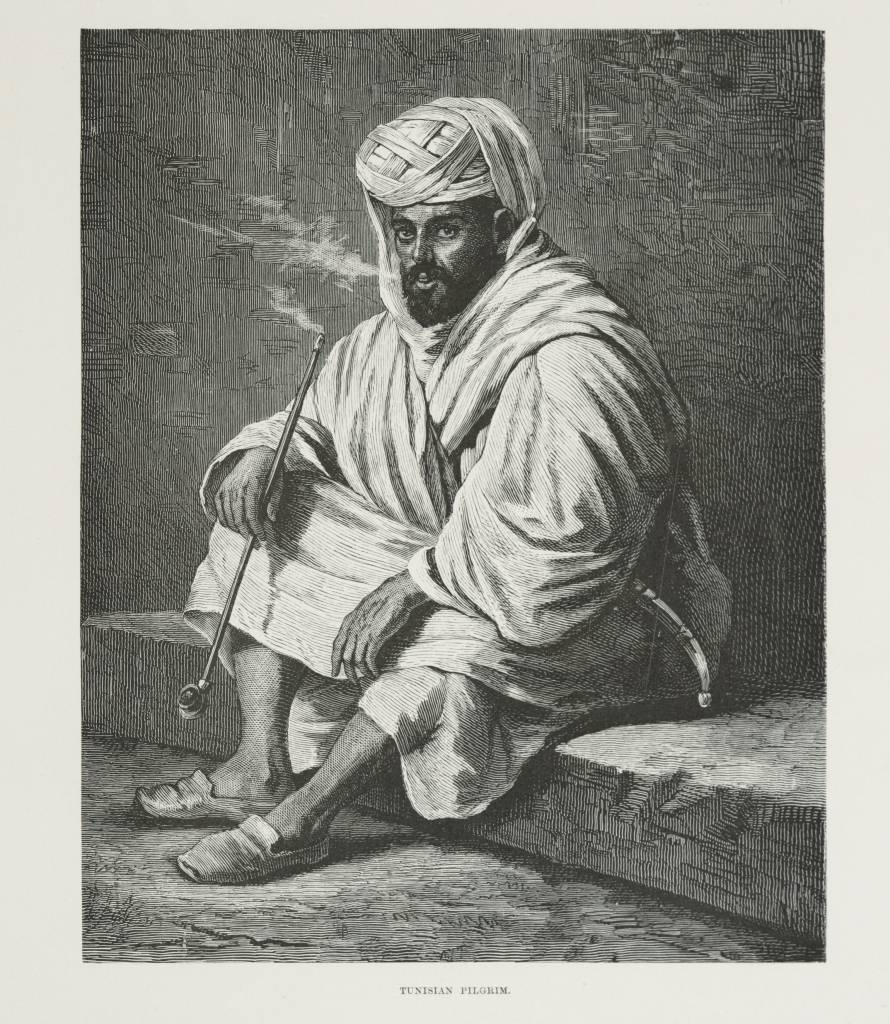
Tunisian pilgrim, 1878

Cannabis in Tunisia is illegal. Cannabis is also known as Zatla nationally or Takrouri regionally.

== History ==
Cannabis is believed to have been introduced to Tunisia during the Arab invasions of the 9th through 12th centuries. In 1550 Leo Africanus' Description of Africa described hashish consumption in Tunis:

They have here a compound called Lhasis [ihasis in the original Italian], whereof whosoever eateth but one ounce falleth a laughing, disporting, and dallying, as if he were half drunken; and is by the said confection marvellously provoked unto lust.

Cannabis prohibition was introduced in Tunisia under French rule and outlawed by decree on 23 April 1953.

== Enforcement ==
Tunisia still uses urinalysis to prove cases of use without possession. If the urinalysis result is below 20 nanogram/liter, the defendant will be accused by inhalation which is 6 months of imprisonment.
