= Cannabis in Tajikistan =

- Location of Tajikistan (dark green)
- Medicinal: Illegal
- Recreational: Illegal

Cannabis in Tajikistan is illegal with severe penalties for the production, sale, and possession of marijuana for medicinal or recreational purposes. Punishments include up to five years in prison for possession and capital punishment or 25-year sentence for sale.

According to the World Drug Report 2006, 3.4% of the population use cannabis at least once per year. A survey of 5,003 schoolchildren aged 15-16 showed that 0.5% of the respondents reporting that they had tried marijuana or hashish at least once. The United Nations described Tajikistan with having a "relatively minor problem", reporting 30.95 hectares of wild growth and 1.24 hectares of illicit cannabis cultivation in 2006. Most cultivation is for personal use.

== History ==
Cannabis is native to Central Asia and grows in abundance in the wild. Cultivation and use of cannabis in the area dates back at least 2,500 years.

Whilst under the rule of the Soviet Union, large-scale cannabis eradication campaigns were undertaken. Post-independence, these campaigns were scaled back due to limited resources.
