= Cannabis in Timor-Leste =

- Location of Timor-Leste (dark green)
- Medicinal: Illegal
- Recreational: Illegal

Cannabis in Timor-Leste is illegal.

A 2012 assessment undertaken on behalf of the UNFPA noted that cannabis was easily available in Timor-Leste, often termed "ganja", with "coklat" appearing to refer to hashish.

Cannabis was believed to be grown locally, usually bought and smoked in a pre-rolled joint, while hashish (smoked mixed with tobacco in a cigarette or sometimes a bong) was believed to be smuggled from Indonesia.

On September 15, 2022, the president of Timor-Leste, José Ramos-Horta, gave a speech calling for a more progressive drug policy that would distinguish cannabis from narcotics. He cited the benefits of cannabis on crime, health, and the economy in other countries.
