= Cannabis in New Caledonia =

Cannabis in New Caledonia is illegal, but is cultivated illicitly. Sources note that "hard drugs" are rare in New Caledonia, and their drug issues are primarily confined to cannabis, with local Kanak chiefs being anti-drug and working to eradicate cannabis plantations.
