= Cannabis in the United Arab Emirates =

Cannabis in the United Arab Emirates is illegal. Trafficking has a minimum five year sentence. Use and possession has a minimum three month sentence, and may result in deportation of expats.

== Law ==
The United Arab Emirates prohibits the trafficking and sale of drugs, including cannabis, with drug use punishable of up to four years in prison. Non-citizens found with possession of drugs may face deportation, at the discretion of the judge. In 2022, the criminal penalties for drug-related crimes was reduced, with a possibility of no punishment for first-time offenders. Possessing products, like clothes, depicting images or text deemed to promote drug use is punishable of up to AED 50,000.

== Economy ==
The UAE is not a significant cannabis producer or consumer, but is a major transshipment point for cannabis from Pakistan and Afghanistan, due to its free ports and heterogeneous population.
