= Cannabis in Kyrgyzstan =

- Location of Kyrgyzstan (dark green)
- Medicinal: Illegal
- Recreational: Illegal

Cannabis in Kyrgyzstan is illegal, but has a long history in the nation, which has been posited as the ancestral homeland of the cannabis plant.

== Reform ==
In the 1990s, Felix Kulov, Vice President and later Prime Minister of Kyrgyzstan, proposed state control of cannabis fields in Kyrgyzstan to control the drug trade.

In 2014, narcologist and former presidential candidate Jengishbek Nazaraliev proposed legalizing cannabis to reduce drug addiction, gain tax revenue, and undercut organized crime.

In 2017, Deputy Prime Minister Tolkunbek Abdygulov suggested legalizing cannabis to improve tourism in the country.
