= Cannabis in the Marshall Islands =

- Location of the Marshall Islands (dark green)
- Medicinal: Illegal
- Recreational: Illegal

Cannabis is illegal in the Marshall Islands.

== Law ==
The possession, sale, disposition, cultivation, production, and prescribing of cannabis is regulated by the Narcotic Drugs (Prohibition and Control) Act 1987.

=== Possession ===
It is illegal to possess cannabis under Section 903 of the Narcotic Drugs (Prohibition and Control) Act 1987.

=== Exceptions for medical use ===
An individual may possess cannabis if it is obtained pursuant to a valid prescription of a medical practitioner under Section 904 of the Act. Despite this section, medicinal cannabis is not available on the islands.

=== Sentence ===
==== First offence: Possession of one ounce or less ====
If an individual is convicted of possession of one ounce or less on a first offence, they are subject to a fine between $1,000 and $5,000 or imprisonment between six months and one year, or both.

==== First offence: Possession of more than one ounce ====
If an individual is convicted of possession of more than one ounce on a first offence, they are subject to a fine between $5,000 and $25,000 or imprisonment between one and five years, or both.

==== Second offence: Possession of one ounce or less ====
If an individual is convicted of possession of cannabis of one ounce or less on a second or subsequent conviction, they are subject to a fine between $5,000 and $25,000 or imprisonment between one and five years, or both.

==== Second offence: Possession of more than one ounce ====
If an individual is convicted of possession of more than one ounce on a second or subsequent conviction, they are subject to a fine between $25,000 and $50,000 or imprisonment between five and fifteen years, or both.
