= Cannabis in Venezuela =

Cannabis in Venezuela is illegal. As of 15 September 2010 possession of up to 20 grams of marijuana or 5 grams of genetically modified marijuana, if proven not to be for medical or personal consumption, is punishable by 1 to 2 years in prison at judge's discretion. If deemed to be for personal consumption, the user is subject to security measures involving rehabilitation and detoxification procedures. Articles 131 and 153 of the Organic Law of Drugs.
