= Cannabis in Lesotho =

Cannabis in Lesotho is a traditional crop that remains illegal for any use, except for medical and scientific purposes. The plant is known as matekoane in Sesotho language but also called khomo ea fatše, likata or kakana.

Cannabis is widely produced in the country, being the nation's most significant cash-crop. In the 2000s it was estimated that 70% of the cannabis in South Africa originated in Lesotho. In 2017 Lesotho became the first African nation to grant a license for the cultivation of medical cannabis.

== History and culture ==
Cannabis use dates back to at least the 16th century in Lesotho, when the Koena people traded cannabis to the local San tribes in exchange for land around 1550. By the 19th century, cannabis was a staple crop in the kingdom.

Until this day, Cannabis remains cultivated almost everywhere in Lesotho, including the capital, but the primary cultivation is in the central mountain zones and western foothills.

== Legislation ==
In 2008, the Drugs of Abuse Act replaced Lesotho's Dangerous Medicines Act of 1973, bringing the country in line with international drugs policy standards, including the 1961 Single Convention on Narcotic Drugs. The Drug of Abuse (Cannabis) Regulations Act of 2018 was the latest amendment to cannabis legislation in the country.

=== Enforcement ===
In one joint South African-Lesotho operation in 2006, 47 tons of cannabis were seized. Cultivation is for the most part tolerated, however, due to the high rate of poverty in the nation and the economic benefits that the cannabis trade provides.

=== Medical cannabis reform ===
In 2017, the Lesotho Ministry of Health licensed a South African firm to grow cannabis in Lesotho for medical and scientific purposes, the first such authorized establishment in Africa.

In late 2017/early 2018, the Lesotho government licensed 5 companies to produce medical marijuana. Three of these companies have been partially, or entirely acquired by established licensed Canadian producers:

- Verve Dynamics - roughly 30% ownership by Aphria (Canada)
- MediGrow Lesotho - 10% acquired by Supreme Cannabis (Canada)
- Daddy-Cann - 100% acquired by Canopy Growth (Canada)
- Medi-Kingdom - 100% owned Medi-Kingdom (UK)
- Pharmaceuticals Development Corp (PDC) - Now owned by Corix (US)
- Bophelo Bioscience and Wellness PTY - 20% acquired by Halo Labs Inc (Canada)
- WeGROW Medical Cannabis Lesotho- 80% owned by ASIF420 (Israel)

The reform has been criticised for failing to "provide opportunities for Small, Medium and Micro Enterprises (SMMEs) to venture into the Cannabis business". Scholars found "questionable whether the Lesotho government are acting with due regard for its most vulnerable rural households, who have now long depended on cannabis cultivation to support themselves" and activists have regretted that

Cannabis remains illegal for the citizens […] and this means that Basotho […] people are not allowed to use, possess or cultivate Cannabis, nor are they allowed to access Cannabis products for their own benefit, whether for industrial, traditional, religious, medicinal or adult use. […] Lesotho citizens continue to be arrested on the street and in their homes whilst large quantities of Cannabis cross the border every day into South Africa.

== Bioprospecting ==
As many other African countries, Lesotho is a country where traditional Cannabis plant varieties (strains) have been grown for generations. Because these varieties are often bioprospected, there has been complaints that cannabis strains are "now being exported across the world, most often with no benefit to the local communities who have been tending these genetics for generations" making it a genetic resource at risk of biopiracy.
