= Cannabis in Cape Verde =

Cannabis in Cabo Verde is illegal, but is produced and trafficked illicitly.

The most-trafficked drug in Cabo Verde is cocaine, which is sometimes combined with locally grown cannabis to create a drug called cochamba.
