= Cannabis in Macau =

- Location of Macau (red)
- Medicinal: Illegal
- Recreational: Illegal

Cannabis in Macau is illegal, but the territory has been used for illicit smuggling of cannabis. Macau is noted, along with Japan, Singapore, and Hong Kong, as an area where cannabis commands a particularly high retail price.

For the period 2007–2011, cannabis arrests made up 5–6% of drug cases in the territory, compared to 37–45% for ketamine, the drug most commonly encountered.
