= Cannabis in Laos =

- Location of Laos (dark green)
- Medicinal: Illegal
- Recreational: Illegal

Cannabis is illegal in Laos. However, a cannabis culture still exists in the country.

== Regulation ==
Cannabis is illegal and public usage can land someone 12 months in jail. Police officers regularly take bribes from those arrested for cannabis and let them walk free. As of 2009, a mandatory death penalty is applied for certain cases. Despite the law, marijuana is openly sold in some businesses.

== Culture ==
Cannabis is widely available in Laos despite its illegal status. In the tourist heavy area of Vang Vieng in particular, cannabis is openly sold by bars as marijuana bud or as infused "happy pizza". Some restaurants will have a "happy" menu where customers can get a variety of infused foods, sometimes along with "magic" goods containing psychedelic mushrooms. Because of Vang Vieng's openness towards cannabis, psychedelic mushrooms, and opium, it has become a famous tourist destination.
