= Cannabis in Mongolia =

- Location of Mongolia (dark green)
- Medicinal: Illegal
- Recreational: Illegal

Cannabis is illegal in Mongolia. In 2008, most of the cannabis seized in Mongolia was grown locally, though some was produced in Russia.

== History ==
Cannabis may have been introduced to Mongolia by the Scythians, and historically was used for medical and shamanic purposes.
