= Cannabis in Togo =

- Location of Togo (dark green)
- Medicinal: Illegal
- Recreational: Illegal

Cannabis in Togo is illegal.

== Cultivation ==
A 1995 report noted that cannabis was Togo's only drug crop and was not exported.
