= Cannabis in Mali =

- Location of Mali (dark green)
- Medicinal: Illegal
- Recreational: Illegal

Cannabis in Mali is illegal, with cultivation, possession, and sale of the substance banned. There is no legal framework for medical cannabis.

== History ==
Mali's laws against cannabis are based on French colonial-era laws.

== Traditional uses ==
In Mali, cannabis was considered an aphrodisiac.

== Economy ==
Mali is part of a cannabis resin smuggling route that leads from Morocco to Egypt and Sudan, and onward to Europe. The networks are largely run by Malian Arabs who have community ties to Mauritania and Niger.
