= Cannabis in Qatar =

- Location of Qatar (dark green)
- Medicinal: Illegal
- Recreational: Illegal

Cannabis is illegal in Qatar.

A 2000 report by UNODC estimated the prevalence of adult use of cannabis in Qatar to be between 1-.4%, but increasing.
