= Cannabis in Mauritania =

Cannabis in Mauritania is illegal, but the country serves as a major transit point for Moroccan cannabis en route to Europe.

== Law ==
In Mauritania, it is illegal to grow, sell, possess, or use cannabis. In 1977, hearings before the US House stated that the Mauritanian Drug Enforcement Administration lacked the staff and training to adequately deal with the cannabis issue in the country. Officials presenting the hearings recommended that the country adopt harsher laws on cannabis.

== Cannabis-trafficking route ==
=== Trafficking ===
Mauritania is part of a cannabis-trafficking route extending from Morocco through Mauritania and on to Mali, then overland to Egypt and eventually to Europe. Approximately one-third of Moroccan cannabis transits this Sahel route. Morocco chooses to go through Mauritania to export its cannabis to avoid Algerian soils, the two countries being in a feud since the Western Sahara issue.

In 2011, Mauritania president Mohamed Ould Abdel Aziz stirred a controversy when he reduced the sentence of 5 cocaine smugglers, and a few months later the court released 30 convicted smugglers. In 2012, a smuggling network was dismantled, and it was discovered that it was using a special permit to cross the border delivered by the former Head of police of Mauritania.

In April 2015, Mohamed Ould Abdel Aziz highlighted in a report on Western Sahara submitted to the UN Security Council by Ban Ki-moon that «considerable quantity of cannabis resin» goes from Morocco to eastern Africa through Mauritania. When journalists of Al-Bayan elaborated on this idea in an article, it caused a diplomatic turmoil, and the chief adviser in the Algerian embassy in Nouakchott was expelled on the basis that Algeria was the source of those «lies and false allegations».

=== Seizures ===
A 2009 UN report on drug trafficking still considered that Mauritania lacked to resources to address its drug issues and observed that very few drug seizures had been recorded in the country.

In January 2012, the Mauritanian authorities seized 2 tons of cannabis in Nouadhibou, and 3.6 tons in Timbedra in May 2012.

In February 2016, the Mauritanian justice charged and jailed 11 people involved in a seizure of 1.3 tons of cannabis. The news report stated that a son of former president Mohamed Khouna Ould Haidalla was involved in the trafficking.

In February 2017, the Moroccan authorities seized 3.13 tons of cannabis in a truck at the Guerguerate crossing point between Morocco and Mauritania. A month later, at the same Guerguarate crossing point, the Moroccan authorities seized 7.42 tons of cannabis in a truck heading to Mauritania.

== Cultivation ==
A 1996 report notes that small cannabis plots, irrigated by a dam on the Senegal River, have been found in Southern Mauritania.
