= Cannabis in Uzbekistan =

- Location of Uzbekistan (dark green)
- Medicinal: Illegal
- Recreational: Illegal

Cannabis in Uzbekistan is illegal. Opiates, cannabis, and other plants containing psychotropic substances are illegal.
