= Cannabis in Albania =

Legality of cannabis in Europe Legal for recreational use Legal for medical use Illegal

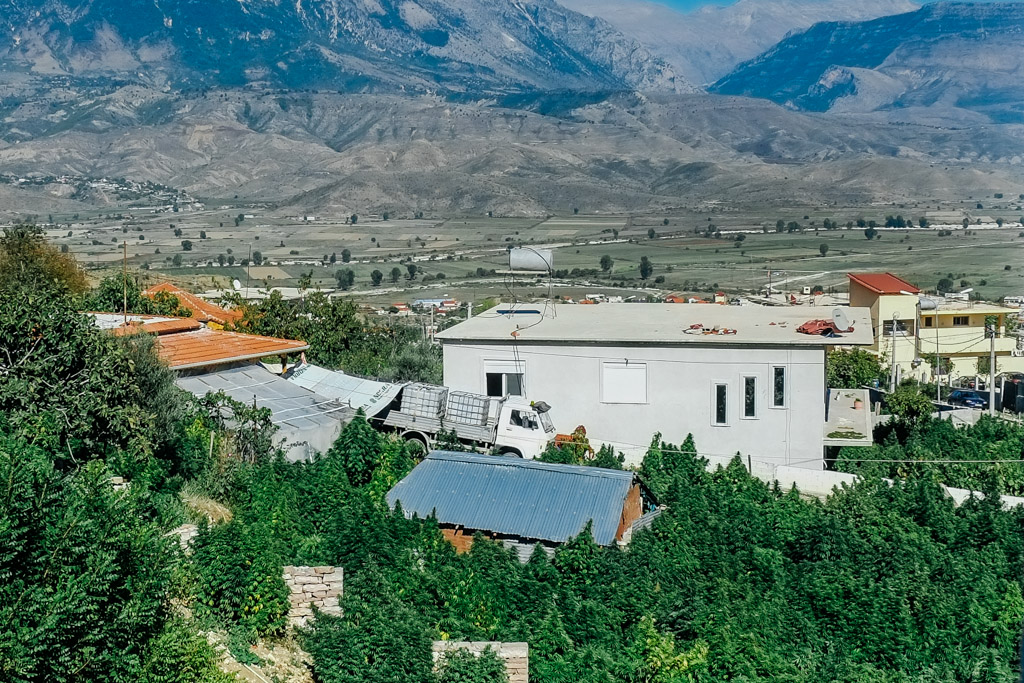
Lazarat, a town in Albania which gained reputation as the "cannabis capital" of the country

Cannabis is legal for medical and industrial purposes in Albania.

== Trafficking ==
Drug trafficking first became a major concern in Albania in the 1990s; in that same period cannabis cultivation which had initially been concentrated in the south became more widespread. Albanian cannabis production is sufficient to meet local demand and also export to other areas, though the country continues to import some hashish through Turkey.

In the mid-2000s, 77% of the cannabis in Italy originated in Albania. A 2009 report, however, noticed a reduction in the significance of Albanian cannabis exports, and that seizures of Albanian herbal cannabis had "become very rare in the last five years."

More recently, although still undoubtedly a net exporter, Albanians have begun importing herbal cannabis as well, with an apparent preference for the hashish varieties of the Maghreb. Total production, meanwhile, in Albania, was estimated by Italian financial police to be around 900 tonnes, worth about 4.5 billion euros.

== Enforcement ==
In 2012, Albania seized 21.2 metric tons of cannabis, nearly twice the amount seized in 2011.

Albania made global headlines and "placed itself on the cannabis map" in 2013 when the Albanian State Police (ASP) tried to shut down production in Lazarat, one of the heaviest producing towns in the mountainous southern regions that are said to be the "heartland" of Albanian cannabis production. Lazarat's villages, 90% of whom are thought to be involved in the cannabis trade in some way, mounted an armed resistance against the ASP with even a "70-year old grandmother" involved in the fighting.

== History ==
It was right after the fall of its communist state that the current large production of cannabis began in Albania. In 1991, criminal groups from Greece began to establish cannabis plantations in southern areas near the Greek border, and the local Albanian farmers embraced an opportunity for some level of financial stability in the turbulent economic situation. In the early days of cannabis production in Albania, trafficking was done by Greek youths who carried bags of cannabis over the mountains across the border, in which Albanian law enforcement found it difficult to control the trade. The new industry took hold quickly despite attempts to curtail it, and it has been reported that in 1995 gunfights between farmers and police were common. Later on, the trade became linked to the Italian mafia, and cannabis was carried to Italy on speedboats going over the Ionian Sea.

Due to its aspirations to join the European Union, Albania is under pressure to present a decisive national anti-drug strategy, and in recent years has escalated police crackdown against the cannabis trade, with mixed results, and coordinating efforts with other national governments such as the Italian government.

On 7 April 2022 after a vote of the national counselling with 61% of people being in favor of legalization, prime minister Edi Rama announced he will pave the way for the legalization of medical cannabis.

On 21 July 2023 the Albanian Parliament voted 69-23 to legalize medical cannabis.
