= Cannabis in Kazakhstan =

- Location of Kazakhstan (dark green)
- Medicinal: Illegal
- Recreational: Illegal

Consuming and possession of cannabis in Kazakhstan is illegal.

Extensive amounts of cannabis plants grow wild in the country. The 2006 World Drug Report estimated that 400,000 hectares of cannabis grow wild in the Chui Valley.

Per Russia's Ministry of Internal Affairs, 93% of the nation's marijuana comes from Kazakhstan.
