= Cannabis in Papua New Guinea =

- Location of Papua New Guinea (dark green)
- Medicinal: Illegal
- Recreational: Illegal

Cannabis in Papua New Guinea is illegal, but the nation is a significant producer and consumer of cannabis. Cannabis is sometimes called spak brus in local parlance.

== History ==
Cannabis is believed to have been introduced to PNG by Australian and American expatriates in the 1960s-1970s. From them the habit spread to locals, and by the 1980s cannabis could be bought in the major cities.

== Agriculture ==
Though cannabis can be grown throughout PNG, it is largely grown in the mountainous highlands from 1400–2200 m in elevation, particularly in the drier areas of the highlands where it is said to grow a more powerful product.

== Economy ==
Cannabis is the only illegal drug produced in significant amounts in PNG, and is the most popular illegal drug consumed there; it is largely grown in Eastern Highlands, Western Highlands, and Southern Highlands provinces, and from there transported to other sites in the country. Cannabis is produced for domestic use, as well as for export (primarily to Australia), and per some reports cannabis has been bartered for weapons.

Cannabis is a lucrative cash crop in PNG, and is exported to Australia across the Torres Strait. 1990 reports state the "PNG Gold" was valued at AU$12,000 per kilogram.
