= Opioid addiction in West Africa =

In 2023, drug seizures by authorities in Africa accounted for half of the global seizures of pharmaceutical opioids, particularly tramadol. There is a high rate of tramadol use and addiction in Ghana, Togo, Nigeria and Benin. In West Africa, opiates are especially popular amongst the young, especially young men, and amongst people doing physical labour and in working class occupations.

== By country ==
=== Nigeria ===
In 2024, opioids were the leading cause of fatal drug overdose in Nigeria. In 2024, opioids such as tramadol and codeine were widely available in Nigeria. Other opiates available include pentazocine and morphine. Opiate use is widespread, in both urban and rural areas. In some communities, opioid use is normalised, and seen as a non-stigmatised way to address personal stress.

In 2024, there were few treatment centres available. Law enforcement action has focused upon the criminalisation of drug use, rather than interdicting supply of the drugs.

In response, the Nigerian government has tasked the National Drug Law Enforcement Agency (NDLEA) with tackling the opiate issue. Drugs are seized, and users are arrested. A public awareness campaign about the dangers of drugs is in effect. Open drug markets have been banned, where street stalls and shops previously sold medications without any regulation. Local codeine production and sale without prescription has been banned.

=== Ghana ===
In 2021, it was estimated that between 24.9% and 77.6% of Ghanaian youth recreationally used tramadol. More men than women used the drug, and especially males in the informal job sector.

In Ghana's media, young people's use of tramadol has been framed in moral terms, rather than a health issue. Structural factors in Ghanaian society that may influence the uptake of Tramadol use, include poor working conditions, anxiety and uncertainty of employment.

There are recreational users of tramadol in Ghana's middle class. There is a more daily "functional use" amongst those engaged in harder physical work. There are higher rates of tramadol use amongst the unemployed.

Cited reasons for using tramadol, including boosting mood, stress relief, physical endurance at work, and as a sexual enhancer. Some tramadol users reported being coerced into taking up the drug by their employers, so they could work harder, and for longer hours.

=== Liberia ===
"Kush" is a synthetic drug sold in Liberia in pellet form, for 100 Liberian dollars per pellet in 2023, the equivalent of 50 US cents. It is the same "Kush" as found in Sierra Leone. In 2024, Kush tested in Sierra Leone and Guinea-Bissau contained cannabis, mixed with nitazene derivatives, tramadol and formaldehyde. In Sierra Leone in 2024, 83% of the Kush samples contained nitazenes, which are powerful synthetic opiates. In Guinea in 2024, 55% of the samples contained nitazenes.

=== Ivory Coast ===
In 2025, tapentadol is an opioid available in Ivory Coast. In Ivory Coast, it is cheap and widely available. In 2025, a BBC world news investigation found that the tapentadol in Ivory Coast was being sourced from pharmaceutical manufacturers in India.

A combination brand sold in Ivory Coast, is "Tramaking". It is manufactured in India, and contains tapentadol and carisoprodol. Carisoprodol is a muscle relaxant. The two drugs combined, the opiate and the muscle relaxant, can cause convulsions and death. Locally, it is sometimes referred to as "apple", or "225".

In 2023, a song promoted a local brand of tramadol, named "kadhafi". Aimed at young people, the song's lyrics repeated the phrase "I want to get high on kadhafi". Kadhafi cost between 200 and 500 CFA francs, between €0.30 and €0.76 euros, per tablet. In July 2023, the Ivorian police launched an anti-drug campaign in response. In one raid alone, 927 kg of tablets were seized.

=== Sierra Leone ===
"Kush" is a synthetic drug prevalent in Sierra Leone, containing synthetic opioids in the form of Nitazenes, and/or synthetic cannabinoids. Chemicals are ordered from China and then mixed in labs in Sierra Leone's capital Freetown. The resulting liquid is sprayed onto plant material, to be smoked and sold as kush.

The synthetic opioids and cannabinoids in the drugs are highly addictive. Kush's prevalence has fuelled police corruption in Sierra Leone. 'Cartels' are the local name for kush smoking bars.

Experimentation with new recipes to increase the high associated with Kush, has increased the rate of overdoses. Kush is a depressant. The high it provides the user is short lasting. Addiction symptoms range from sores, to psychosis. Kush can cause liver, kidney and respiratory problems. A 2025 report found that nearly half of Sierra Leone's Kush contained opioids up to 25 times stronger than fentanyl.

In 2024, the government of Sierra Leone declared that the use of Kush was a public health emergency, and introduced legal, health, and prevention measures.

Women in Sierra Leone under the influence of Kush, have been vulnerable to rape. Women have been impregnated while high on Kush, and don't know the men responsible.

More men use Kush than women. Women addicts in Sierra Leone have been reluctant to seek treatment, due to social stigma.

== See also ==
- Brown-brown, cocaine or amphetamine mixed with smokeless gunpowder. Given to child soldiers in West Africa.
