= Legality of cannabis =

Legal status of cannabis worldwide

Legal status of cannabis possession by adults for recreational use^{1} Legal Illegal but decriminalized Illegal but often unenforced^{2} Illegal^{1}May include recent laws or court decisions which have not yet entered into effect.^{2}Cannabis products under 0.2% THC are legal in Thailand. While products over 0.2% THC were legal before 2025, they now require a prescription, though the law is unenforced.

Legal status of cannabis for medical use by adults^{1} Legal for recreational and medical uses Legal only for certain medical uses Illegal Legality unknown^{1}May include recent laws or court decisions which have not yet entered into effect.

The legality of cannabis for medical and recreational use varies by country, in terms of its possession, distribution, and cultivation, and (in regard to medical) how it can be consumed and what medical conditions it can be used for. These policies in most countries are regulated by three United Nations treaties: the 1961 Single Convention on Narcotic Drugs, the 1971 Convention on Psychotropic Substances, and the 1988 Convention Against Illicit Traffic in Narcotic Drugs and Psychotropic Substances. Cannabis is only scheduled under the Single Convention and was reclassified in 2020 to a Schedule I-only drug (from being both Schedule I and IV drug previously, with the schedules from strictest to least being IV, I, II, and III). As a Schedule I drug under the treaty, countries can allow the medical use of cannabis but it is considered to be an addictive drug with a serious risk of abuse and may be able to regulate non-medical cannabis industry under its Article 2 paragraph 9.

The use of cannabis for recreational purposes is prohibited in most countries; however, many have adopted a policy of decriminalization to make simple possession a non-criminal offense (often similar to a minor traffic violation). Others have much more severe penalties such as some Middle Eastern and Far Eastern countries where possession of even small amounts is punished by imprisonment for several years. Countries that have legalized various recreational uses of cannabis are Canada, Czech Republic, Georgia, Germany, Luxembourg, Malta, South Africa, and Uruguay, plus 24 states, 3 territories, and the District of Columbia in the United States and the Australian Capital Territory in Australia. Commercial sale of recreational cannabis is legalized nationwide in two countries (Canada and Uruguay) and in all subnational U.S. jurisdictions that have legalized possession except Washington, D.C. A policy of limited enforcement has also been adopted in many countries, in particular the Netherlands where the sale of cannabis is tolerated at licensed coffeeshops.

The legalization of recreational cannabis has been put forward as a solution to restrict access to the drug by minors, a method of harm reduction, a way of reducing organized crime, aid economic growth and revenue, as well as enable job creation. Unregulated cannabis from the illegal black market comes with increased health risks, such as unknown THC rate, unknown potency, possible toxic additives and contaminants and synthetic cannabinoids. Whereas, a legal and regulated cannabis system enables product quality and safety requirements to be mandated for public safety and consumer awareness. Cannabis illegality tends to become a burden on the criminal justice system, with legalization as a way to free up police time and resources to focus on more serious crimes, reduce the prison population of non-violent drug offenders and thus save taxpayers money. As of 2023, the legalization of cannabis has helped to create 151,000 jobs in Canada since its legalization in 2018. Legal market capture of cannabis in Canada after 5 years of legalization was approximately 78%. Between the start of legalization in October 2018 and August 2025, Canada collected over $5.4 billion in cannabis tax revenue, though cannabis education spending did not meet the original projection.

Countries that have legalized medical use of cannabis include Albania, Argentina, Australia, Barbados, Botswana, Brazil, Canada, Chile, Colombia, Costa Rica, Croatia, Cyprus, Czech Republic, Denmark, Ecuador, Finland, Germany, Greece, Ireland, Israel, Italy, Jamaica, Lebanon, Luxembourg, Malawi, Malta, Mexico, the Netherlands, New Zealand, North Macedonia, Norway, Panama, Peru, Poland, Portugal, Rwanda, Saint Vincent and the Grenadines, San Marino, Slovenia, South Africa, Spain, Sri Lanka, Switzerland, Thailand, Ukraine, the United Kingdom, Uruguay, Vanuatu, Zambia, and Zimbabwe. Others have more restrictive laws that allow only the use of certain cannabis-derived pharmaceuticals, such as Sativex, Marinol, Cesamet, or Epidiolex. In the United States, 41 states, 4 territories, and the District of Columbia have legalized the medical use of cannabis, but at the federal level its use remains prohibited.

== Legalization timeline ==
Countries with legalized recreational cannabis
Country	Effective date	Licensed dispensary sales since	Licensed cannabis club sales since
Uruguay	December 2013	July 2017	October 2014
Canada	17 October 2018	17 October 2018	Never authorized
Malta	14 December 2021	Never authorized	February 2024
Luxembourg	21 July 2023	Never authorized	Awaiting licensing
Germany	1 April 2024	Never authorized	July 2024
South Africa	May 2024	Never authorized	Illegal, with loopholes
Czech Republic	1 January 2026 (Note: Cultivation/production for own use only)	Never authorized	Never authorized

== By country ==
Country/Territory	Recreational	Medical	Notes
Afghanistan	Illegal	Illegal	Main article: Cannabis in Afghanistan Production banned by King Zahir Shah in 1973.
Albania	Illegal	Legal	Main article: Cannabis in Albania Prohibited but plants highly available throughout the country and law often unenforced. On 21 July 2023 the Albanian Parliament voted 69–23 to legalize medical cannabis.
Algeria	Illegal	Illegal	Main article: Cannabis in Algeria
Andorra	Illegal	Illegal	Main article: Cannabis in Andorra
Angola	Illegal	Illegal	Main article: Cannabis in Angola
Antigua and Barbuda	Decriminalized. Legal to grow and use by Rastafari.	Illegal	Main article: Cannabis in Antigua and Barbuda
Argentina	Illegal	Legal	Main article: Cannabis in Argentina Medicinal cannabis was legalized on 22 September 2017.
Armenia	Illegal	Illegal	Main article: Cannabis in Armenia
Australia	Decriminalized in Northern Territory and South Australia. Legal in Australian Capital Territory for personal use but not for sale.	Legal at federal level and in all states. Qualifying conditions and other details vary by state.	Main article: Cannabis in Australia In September 2019, the Australian Capital Territory became the first state or territory of Australia to legalize recreational use of cannabis. Since 31 January 2020 residents aged 18 and over have been allowed to grow two plants and possess 50 g (1 3/4 oz), though sales or other transfer is prohibited, including cannabis seeds. Federal law also remains enforceable.
Austria	Possession for personal use decriminalized as of January 2016.	Dronabinol, Sativex, Nabilone	Main article: Cannabis in Austria
Azerbaijan	Illegal	Illegal	Main article: Cannabis in Azerbaijan
Bahamas	Illegal	Illegal	Main article: Cannabis in the Bahamas
Bahrain	Illegal	Illegal	Main article: Cannabis in Bahrain
Bangladesh	Illegal but often unenforced	Illegal	Main article: Cannabis in Bangladesh Sale banned in 1989.
Barbados	Legal for spiritual use by registered Rastafarians	Legal	Main article: Cannabis in Barbados
Belarus	Illegal	Illegal	Main article: Cannabis in Belarus
Belgium	Decriminalized up to 3 g (1/10 oz) or cultivation of one plant	Sativex	Main article: Cannabis in Belgium Up to 3 g (1/10 oz) decriminalized for adults since 2003.
Belize	Decriminalized up to 10 g (3/8 oz)	Illegal	Main article: Cannabis in Belize Decriminalized up to 10 g (3/8 oz) for personal consumption.
Benin	Illegal	Illegal	Main article: Cannabis in Benin
Bermuda	Decriminalized up to 7 g (1/4 oz)	Legal	Main article: Cannabis in Bermuda In November 2016, the Supreme Court of Bermuda ruled in favor of allowing the medical use of cannabis. As of July 2018, two doctors have been licensed to prescribe the drug.
Bhutan	Illegal	Illegal	Main article: Cannabis in Bhutan Illegal, but plants grow prolifically and have multiple traditional uses, such as feeding pigs and producing textiles.
Bolivia	Illegal	Illegal	Main article: Cannabis in Bolivia
Bosnia and Herzegovina	Illegal	legal	Main article: Cannabis in Bosnia and Herzegovina In 2016, the Ministry of Civil Affairs formed a task force to explore the legalization of cannabis and cannabinoids for medicinal purposes.
Botswana	Illegal	Legal	Main article: Cannabis in Botswana Cannabis is legal for medicinal purposes only.
Brazil	Decriminalized up to 40 g (1 3/8 oz) or cultivation of 6 plants for personal use	Legal for terminally ill patients or those who have exhausted other treatment options.	Main article: Cannabis in Brazil Legislation passed in 2006 to require treatment and community service for possessing small amounts of drugs instead of jail time. Possession of large amounts, as well as sale, transportation, and cultivation, are considered drug trafficking.
Brunei	Illegal	Illegal	Main article: Cannabis in Brunei
Bulgaria	Illegal	Illegal	Main article: Cannabis in Bulgaria Cannabis is classified as a class A (High-risk) drug, together with heroin, cocaine, amphetamines, and MDMA (ecstasy). Until 2004, a loosely defined "personal dose" existed.
Burkina Faso	Illegal	Illegal	Main article: Cannabis in Burkina Faso
Burundi	Illegal	Illegal	Main article: Cannabis in Burundi
Cambodia	Illegal but often unenforced	Illegal	Main article: Cannabis in Cambodia Illegal, but this prohibition is lax and enforced opportunistically. "Happy" restaurants in cities publicly offer food cooked with marijuana, or as a side garnish.
Cameroon	Illegal	Illegal	Main article: Cannabis in Cameroon
Canada	Legal	Legal	Main articles: Cannabis in Canada and Cannabis laws of Canada by province or territory Legal for medicinal purposes since 2001 and for recreational purposes since 17 October 2018. The age to buy or consume cannabis varies by province: 19 in most provinces, 18 in Alberta, and 21 in Quebec.
Cape Verde	Illegal	Illegal	Main article: Cannabis in Cape Verde
Central African Republic	Illegal	Illegal	Main article: Cannabis in the Central African Republic
Chad	Illegal	Illegal	Main article: Cannabis in Chad
Channel Islands	Legal, low regulation	Legal	Current laws allow the sale of cannabis edibles on the island of Sark, which are also exported to dispensaries in Jersey and Guernsey. There is no legal minimum age for cannabis as there is low level of regulation. Most dispensaries only sell to customers over 18. Medicinal cannabis was legalized in 2019. There are cannabis clubs where people may consume cannabis onsite after showing ID and proof of prescription.
Chile	Decriminalized for possession and cultivation	Legal	Main article: Cannabis in Chile Private personal use and recreational cultivation decriminalized. Medicinal cultivation legal with the authorization of The Chilean Agriculture Service (SAG) and sale of medication allowed on prescription in pharmacies.
People's Republic of China (PRC)	Illegal	Illegal	Main article: Cannabis in China Penalty for possession or consumption: 10–15 days' detention without prosecution and a fine.
Colombia	Decriminalized up to 22 g (3/4 oz) or cultivation of 20 plants for personal use	Legal	Main article: Cannabis in Colombia Decriminalized up to 22 g (3/4 oz) for personal consumption. Individuals carrying greater amounts, or cultivating up to 20 plants, cannot be prosecuted if the drug is for personal use.
Comoros	Illegal	Illegal	Main article: Cannabis in Comoros Cannabis was legal in Comoros between January 1975 and May 1978, when president Ali Soilih legalized cannabis consumption among other measures.
Cook Islands	Illegal	Legal	Main article: Cannabis in the Cook Islands A non-binding referendum in August 2022 asked "Should we review our cannabis laws to allow for research and medicinal use?" 62% voted yes.
Democratic Republic of the Congo	Illegal	Illegal	Main article: Cannabis in the Democratic Republic of the Congo
Republic of the Congo	Illegal	Illegal	Main article: Cannabis in the Republic of the Congo
Costa Rica	Decriminalized	Legal	Main article: Cannabis in Costa Rica Decriminalized since police officers do not detain people for personal use, yet no amount has been defined as a minimum for possession. Use of cannabis is widespread throughout the country.
Croatia	Decriminalized	Legal	Main article: Cannabis in Croatia Possession of small amounts is considered a misdemeanor subject to fixed fines. Medicinal cannabis legal for patients with illnesses such as cancer, multiple sclerosis, or HIV/AIDS.
Cuba	Illegal	Illegal	Main article: Cannabis in Cuba
Cyprus	Illegal	Legal	Main article: Cannabis in Cyprus Class B substance – life imprisonment is possible for use and maximum 8 years for possession (at the maximum 2 years for the first offense for people under 25).
Czech Republic	Possession of up to 25 g (0.88 oz) in public and up to 100 g (3.5 oz) in private is permitted, and cultivation of up to 3 plants for personal use is allowed for those aged 21 and over.	Legal with prescription. Without prescription, sale of products up to 1% THC allowed.	Main article: Cannabis in the Czech Republic Possession of less than 15 grams (½ oz) has been decriminalized since 1 January 2010. Since 1 January 2026, it has been legal for persons over the age of 21 to possess up to 100 g of cannabis at home and up to 25 g in public, and to grow up to 3 plants. Medical use has been legal and regulated since 2013.
Denmark	Illegal	Legal	Main article: Cannabis in Denmark As with all drugs, cannabis-related offenses are punishable by a fine or imprisonment for up to 2 years. Freetown Christiania, a self-declared autonomous community in Copenhagen, is known for its cannabis trade.
Djibouti	Illegal	Illegal	Main article: Cannabis in Djibouti
Dominica	Decriminalized up to 28 g (1 oz)	Illegal	Main article: Cannabis in Dominica
Dominican Republic	Illegal	Illegal	Main article: Cannabis in the Dominican Republic
Ecuador	Illegal	Legal	Main article: Cannabis in Ecuador Possession of up to 10 g (3/8 oz) decriminalized in 2013, but policy was repealed by President Daniel Noboa in 2023.
Egypt	Illegal but often unenforced	Illegal	Main article: Cannabis in Egypt Illegal since 1925 but use is widespread. Convictions for personal use are rare. Formerly a plant of high status with several documented medicinal uses in ancient times.
El Salvador	Illegal	Illegal	Main article: Cannabis in El Salvador
Equatorial Guinea	Illegal	Illegal	Main article: Cannabis in Equatorial Guinea
Eritrea	Illegal	Illegal	Main article: Cannabis in Eritrea
Estonia	Decriminalized	With a special permit	Main article: Cannabis in Estonia Up to 7.5 g (1/4 oz) is considered an amount for personal use, and is punished with a fine. Large amounts and distribution are criminal offenses punishable with a custodial sentence of up to 5 years. Medical cannabis is technically legal, but to get a prescription is an arduous process and is practically never given, with a single patient having received Sativex preparation.
Eswatini (Swaziland)	Illegal	Illegal	Main article: Cannabis in Eswatini
Ethiopia	Illegal	Illegal	Main article: Cannabis in Ethiopia Despite being the spiritual homeland of the Rastafari movement, possession of cannabis can result in up to six months imprisonment.
Fiji	Illegal	Illegal	Main article: Cannabis in Fiji
Finland	Illegal but sometimes not enforced	Legal under license.	Main article: Cannabis in Finland Personal use is generally not prosecuted in court but subject to summary fine. Medicinal cannabis possible under a special license since 2006; in 2014, 223 licenses were issued.
France	Illegal, but on-the-spot fines are usually issued in place of prosecution	A two-year trial program involving 3,000 patients underway	Main article: Cannabis in France Possession up to 100 g (3 1/2 oz) entails a €200 fine since November 2018, although a judge is still legally able to pronounce a stricter sentence. Medical use of some cannabinoid drugs legalized in 2013.
Gabon	Illegal	Illegal	Main article: Cannabis in Gabon
Gambia	Illegal	Illegal	Main article: Cannabis in the Gambia
Georgia	Technically legal for personal use but not for sale, per a July 2018 ruling by the Constitutional Court of Georgia. Legislatively decriminalized up to 5g dried or 10g fresh, only for first offenders since 2025.	Use is technically legal, but practically limited. No system for the dispensing of cannabis exists.	Main article: Cannabis in Georgia (country)
Germany	Legal for possession, consumption, and cultivation since 1 April 2024. Distribution allowed through non-profit cannabis clubs since 1 July 2024.	Legal	Main article: Cannabis in Germany On 23 February 2024, the German Bundestag passed the Act on the Controlled Use of Cannabis, legalizing possession of 25 g (7/8 oz) outside the home, 50 g (1 3/4 oz) at home, and private cultivation of three plants, for adults 18 and over, since 1 April 2024. Collective, noncommercial cultivation is legal in cultivation associations (i.e. cannabis social clubs) since 1 July 2024.
Ghana	Illegal	Legal only for THC less than 0.3%	Main article: Cannabis in Ghana
Greece	Illegal	Legal	Main article: Cannabis in Greece
Greenland (Kalaallit Nunaat)	Illegal	Illegal	Main article: Cannabis in Greenland
Grenada	Illegal	Illegal	Main article: Cannabis in Grenada
Guatemala	Illegal	Illegal	Main article: Cannabis in Guatemala In 2016 a constitutional commission rejected proposals to legalize medicinal or recreational use of cannabis.
Guinea	Illegal	Illegal	
Guinea-Bissau	Illegal	Illegal	
Guyana	Illegal	Illegal	Main article: Cannabis in Guyana Possession of 15 g (1/2 oz) or over can result in charges of drug trafficking.
Haiti	Illegal	Illegal	Main article: Cannabis in Haiti
Honduras	Illegal	Illegal	Main article: Cannabis in Honduras The possession, sale, transportation, and cultivation of cannabis is illegal.
Hong Kong	Illegal	Illegal	Main article: Cannabis in Hong Kong Possession, sale, transportation, and cultivation illegal under the Dangerous Drug Ordinance. (Chapter 134 of the Law of Hong Kong)
Hungary	Illegal	CBD only	Main article: Cannabis in Hungary There is no distinction in Hungarian law between illicit drugs according to dangers. Heroin use has the same legal consequences as cannabis use.
Iceland	Illegal	Illegal	Main article: Cannabis in Iceland Banned in 1969. Possession of small amounts is subject to arrest and fine but no threat of jail time.
India	Illegal, but exception is made for the use of bhang.	CBD oil legal, less than 0.3% THC	Main article: Cannabis in India Albeit illegal, usage is prevalent and some government-owned shops sell cannabis in the form of bhang. States have their own laws regarding cannabis, locally known as ganja.
Indonesia	Illegal	Illegal	Main article: Cannabis in Indonesia Banned in 1927. Minimum sentence of 4 years in prison (additional fines may apply) if caught dealing / distributing. Rehabilitation or maximum sentence of 4 years if caught in possession alone.
Iran	Illegal, but not strictly enforced	Illegal	Main article: Cannabis in Iran Maximum of capital punishment to possess hashish over 5 kg (11 lb) but unenforced.
Iraq	Illegal	Illegal	Main article: Cannabis in Iraq
Ireland	Illegal	Legal as part of 5-year pilot program enacted in June 2019	Main article: Cannabis in Ireland The National Drugs Strategy of 2009–2016 did not favor decriminalizing cannabis. A new strategy was planned for 2017. Cannabis-derived medicines may be licensed since 2014. A review of policy on medicinal cannabis was announced in November 2016, and a private member's bill to legalize it passed second stage in the Dáil in December 2016.
Israel	Decriminalized	Legal	Main article: Cannabis in Israel As of April 2019, public possession of small amounts is a non-criminal offense punished by escalating fines. A third offense can result in criminal charges, however. Possession in the privacy of one's home is not punished.
Italy	Possession decriminalized; home cultivation legal in small amounts for personal use.	Legal	Main article: Cannabis in Italy Possession of small amounts for personal use is a misdemeanor subject to fines and the suspension of documents (passports or driver's licenses). Sale is punishable by imprisonment, even if in small amounts. Licensed cultivation for medicinal and industrial use strictly regulated.
Ivory Coast	Illegal	Illegal	Main article: Cannabis in Ivory Coast
Jamaica	Decriminalized up to 56.5 g (2 oz) or cultivation of 5 plants. Legal for Rastafari.	Legal	Main article: Cannabis in Jamaica Decriminalized since 2015, and in 2018 the first medical cannabis dispensary opened.
Japan	Illegal	CBD only	Main article: Cannabis in Japan Restricted in 1948. Use and possession are punishable by up to 5 years imprisonment and a fine. Cultivation, sale, and transport are punishable by 7–10 years imprisonment and a fine.
Jordan	Illegal	Illegal	Main article: Cannabis in Jordan
Kazakhstan	Illegal	Illegal	Main article: Cannabis in Kazakhstan
Kenya	Illegal	Illegal	Main article: Cannabis in Kenya
Kiribati	Illegal	Illegal	Main article: Cannabis in Kiribati
Korea, North (DPRK)	Illegal, but widely unenforced according to defectors.	Use is legal when prescribed, but no system for the dispensing of cannabis confirmed.	Main article: Cannabis in North Korea Cannabis is listed in Appendix 1 Narcotics in the DPRK. Narcotics Control Law (2005) states that narcotics may be used when prescribed. There are conflicting reports on the legal status of cannabis in North Korea. Multiple reports from defectors and tourists claim there is no law regarding the possession of cannabis in North Korea or if there is, it is mostly unenforced. However, other reports claim that cannabis is illegal.
Korea, South	Illegal	Access limited to Epidiolex, Marinol and Sativex as of now due to a policy implemented by the Ministry of Food and Drug Safety	Main article: Cannabis in South Korea Medical use of cannabis was legalized in November 2018. The plant itself, however, remains unavailable due to a policy implemented by the Ministry of Food and Drug Safety.
Kosovo	Illegal	Illegal	Main article: Cannabis in Kosovo
Kuwait	Illegal	Illegal	Main article: Cannabis in Kuwait
Kyrgyzstan	Illegal	Illegal	Main article: Cannabis in Kyrgyzstan
Laos	Illegal but often unenforced	Illegal	Main article: Cannabis in Laos
Latvia	Illegal	Illegal	Main article: Cannabis in Latvia Possession of up to 1 g (1/28 oz) can result in a €280 fine; for second offenses within a year period, criminal charges are applied. Larger quantities can be punished with up to 15 years in prison.
Lebanon	Illegal	Legal	Main article: Cannabis in Lebanon Hashish banned in 1926; cultivation banned in 1992. Large amounts of cannabis are still grown within the country illicitly, however. Cultivation of cannabis for medical use was legalized in April 2020.
Lesotho	Illegal but tolerated	Illegal	Main article: Cannabis in Lesotho Licensed cultivation allowed for export to other countries. Also widely grown for illicit purposes.
Liberia	Illegal	Illegal	Main article: Cannabis in Liberia
Libya	Illegal	Illegal	
Liechtenstein	Illegal	Illegal	Main article: Cannabis in Liechtenstein
Lithuania	Illegal	Illegal	Main article: Cannabis in Lithuania Medical cannabis is illegal in Lithuania, but a law allowing seriously ill patients to use drugs made from synthetic cannabinoids was passed by the Seimas on 11 October 2018.
Luxembourg	Legal to grow up to 4 plants at home for personal consumption. Possession of up to 3 g (1/10 oz) outside the home is decriminalized, subject to a fine. Sale remains prohibited.	Legal	Main article: Cannabis in Luxembourg Decriminalized in 2001. Home use and cultivation has been legal since 21 July 2023 for those aged 18 and over.
Macau, SAR of China	Illegal	Illegal	Main article: Cannabis in Macau
Madagascar	Illegal	Illegal	Main article: Cannabis in Madagascar
Malawi	Illegal	Legal	Main article: Cannabis in Malawi Illegal but widely used and cultivated; Malawian cannabis is famed internationally for its quality. Chamba is grown mainly in central and northern regions like Mzuzu.
Malaysia	Illegal	Illegal	Main article: Cannabis in Malaysia Mandatory death penalty for convicted drug traffickers, legally defined as individuals possessing more than 200 g (7 oz) of cannabis.
Maldives	Illegal	Illegal	Main article: Cannabis in the Maldives
Mali	Illegal	Illegal	Main article: Cannabis in Mali
Malta	Legal for possession, consumption, and cultivation. Distribution is allowed through non-profit cannabis clubs.	Legal	Main article: Cannabis in Malta On 30 March 2021, Prime Minister Robert Abela announced a proposal to legalize possession of up to 7 g (1/4 oz) and the cultivation of up to 4 plants, and for people charged with possession in the past to have it expunged from their criminal records. In December 2021, legislation for those aged 18 and over was passed by the Maltese Parliament and signed into law by President George Vella.
Marshall Islands	Illegal	Illegal	Main article: Cannabis in the Marshall Islands
Mauritania	Illegal	Illegal	Main article: Cannabis in Mauritania
Mauritius	Illegal	Illegal	Main article: Cannabis in Mauritius
Mexico	Legal for possession, consumption, and cultivation with a permit, but not for sale.	Use is legal, but no system for the dispensing of cannabis exists.	Main article: Cannabis in Mexico Possession of 5 g (3/16 oz) was decriminalized in 2009. In 2015 the Supreme Court voted 4–1 that prohibiting people from growing the drug for personal use was unconstitutional. In 2018 the Supreme Court reaffirmed the ruling and requested that the legislature update the country's laws regarding cannabis. After the legislature failed to act, the Supreme Court in 2021 invalidated laws regarding the personal possession and cultivation of cannabis.
Micronesia	Illegal	Illegal	Main article: Cannabis in Micronesia
Moldova	Decriminalized	Illegal	Main article: Cannabis in Moldova
Monaco	Illegal	Illegal	Main article: Cannabis in Monaco
Mongolia	Illegal	Illegal	Main article: Cannabis in Mongolia
Montenegro	Illegal	Illegal	Main article: Cannabis in Montenegro
Morocco	Illegal but often unenforced	Legal	Main article: Cannabis in Morocco Morocco is among the world's top producers of hashish.
Mozambique	Illegal	Illegal	Main article: Cannabis in Mozambique
Myanmar	Illegal but often unenforced	Illegal	Main article: Cannabis in Myanmar
Namibia	Illegal	Illegal	Main article: Cannabis in Namibia Cannabis is illegal; in 2007 the government proposed but declined a 20-year jail sentence for any drug possession.
Nauru	Illegal	Illegal	
Nepal	Illegal, but allowed during Maha Shivaratri	Illegal	Main article: Cannabis in Nepal All cannabis licenses canceled in 1973.
Netherlands	Consumption and sale are tolerated in licensed coffeeshops. Possession of up to 5 g (3/16 oz) is decriminalized. Cultivation of up to 5 plants is unenforced for non-commercial use (unless grown in a professional setup).	Legal	Main article: Cannabis in the Netherlands Personal possession decriminalized for those aged 18 and over and sale allowed only in certain licensed coffeeshops in the continental Netherlands for those of the same age. Cultivation often tolerated but growers can still have their plants and equipment confiscated and face eviction or cancellation of their mortgage for one single plant. Zero tolerance policy in the Caribbean Netherlands.
New Zealand	Illegal	Legal	See also: Cannabis in New Zealand Banned in 1927. Possession over 28 g (1 oz) is presumed for supply. Medical use was legalized in 2018. In 2020, a referendum to legalize recreational use failed by a 50.7% to 48.4% margin.
Nicaragua	Illegal	Illegal	
Niger	Illegal	Illegal	
Nigeria	Illegal	Illegal	Main article: Cannabis in Nigeria
North Macedonia	Illegal	Legal	Main article: Cannabis in North Macedonia If one possesses large amounts, a jail sentence of anywhere from 3 months to 5 years may be given. Medicinal cannabis legalized since 2016.
Norway	Illegal	Legal	Main article: Cannabis in Norway Illegal since 1965. As of 2022, use and possession of up to 15 g (1/2 oz) are punished with heavy fines and possible loss of driver's license. Solberg's Cabinet proposed a decriminalization bill in 2021 that would remove all sanctions for illegal drug use, including possession of up to 10 g (3/8 oz) of cannabis. Six parties (43,8%) voted for, while three parties (56,2%) voted against. As a result, the bill did not pass the parliament.
Oman	Illegal	Illegal	Main article: Cannabis in Oman
Pakistan	Illegal, but often unenforced (particularly in some tribal regions)	CBD only	Main article: Cannabis in Pakistan Prohibited, but the smoking of hashish in Peshawar and the northern parts of Pakistan tends to be tolerated. One may be sent to jail for up to six months if found with charas in other parts of the country. CBD legalized by cabinet announcement in September 2020.
Palau	Illegal	Illegal	Main article: Cannabis in Palau
Panama	Illegal	Legal	Main article: Cannabis in Panama
Papua New Guinea	Illegal	Illegal	Main article: Cannabis in Papua New Guinea
Paraguay	Decriminalized up to 10 g (3/8 oz)	Illegal	Main article: Cannabis in Paraguay The possession of up to 10 g (3/8 oz) of cannabis is not punishable.
Peru	Decriminalized up to 8 g (1/4 oz)	Legal	Main article: Cannabis in Peru Possession of up to 8 g (1/4 oz) is not punished. Cultivation, production, and sale are punished with 8–15 years in prison.
Philippines	Illegal	Illegal but may be allowed with special permit	Main article: Cannabis in the Philippines Medical use of cannabis is possible with a special permit from the Food and Drugs Authority for use by individuals with serious or terminal illness.
Poland	Illegal, but may not be enforced for small amounts, legal below 0.3% THC	Legal	Main article: Cannabis in Poland Since 2011, prosecutors can choose not to prosecute possession of small quantities of cannabis for personal use if it is a first offense or if the person is drug dependent. Possession of large quantities of drugs can result in up to 10 years in prison.
Portugal	Decriminalized up to 25 g (7/8 oz) of herb or 5 g (3/16 oz) of hashish	Legal	Main article: Cannabis in Portugal In 2001, Portugal became the first country in the world to decriminalize the use of all drugs.
Qatar	Illegal	Illegal	Main article: Cannabis in Qatar
Romania	Illegal	Cannabis-derived drugs less than 0.2% THC can be prescribed	Main article: Cannabis in Romania Small quantities punishable by a large fine for first offenders or 6 months to 2 years in prison if the person has been convicted before. Possession of large amounts or trafficking is punishable by 2–7 years of jail time. Decriminalization proposed. Limited medical use approved in 2013.
Russia	Illegal	Illegal	Main article: Cannabis in Russia Possession of up to 6 g (1/5 oz) of cannabis (or 2 g, 1/20 oz of hashish) is an administrative offense, punishable by a fine of ₽5,000 or detention of up to 15 days. Possession of larger amounts is a criminal offense. Foreign nationals and stateless individuals who violate the law are subject to deportation regardless of the amount.
Rwanda	Illegal	Legal	Main article: Cannabis in Rwanda
Saint Kitts and Nevis	Decriminalized up to 56 g (2 oz)	Illegal	Main article: Cannabis in Saint Kitts and Nevis
Saint Lucia	Decriminalized up to 30 g (1 1/16 oz)	Illegal	Main article: Cannabis in Saint Lucia
Saint Vincent and the Grenadines	Decriminalized up to 56 g (2 oz)	Legal	Main article: Cannabis in Saint Vincent and the Grenadines
Samoa	Illegal	Illegal	Main article: Cannabis in Samoa
San Marino	Illegal	Legal	Main article: Cannabis in San Marino
São Tomé and Príncipe	Illegal	Illegal	Main article: Cannabis in São Tomé and Principe
Saudi Arabia	Illegal	Illegal	Main article: Cannabis in Saudi Arabia Use and possession for personal use of any kind of recreational drugs is punishable by imprisonment if caught. Imprisonment for personal use can entail jail time of 6 months or more. Dealing and smuggling high amounts of drugs usually result in harsher prison time or even execution, although recently executions have been rare. Foreigners who use drugs might be deported.
Senegal	Illegal	Illegal	Main article: Cannabis in Senegal
Serbia	Illegal	Illegal	Main article: Cannabis in Serbia Possession of small amounts is punishable by fine or imprisonment of up to 3 years. Sale and transportation punishable by imprisonment of 3–12 years. Cultivation punishable by imprisonment from 6 months to 5 years. Higher penalties for organized crime.
Seychelles	Illegal	Illegal	Main article: Cannabis in Seychelles
Sierra Leone	Illegal	Illegal	Main article: Cannabis in Sierra Leone Cannabis banned in 1920.
Singapore	Illegal	CBD only	Main article: Cannabis in Singapore Banned in 1870. Cannabis is a Class A drug under the Misuse of Drugs Act, making it illegal to cultivate, sell, or possess. Those who are caught with 500 g (1 lb 2 oz) of cannabis or more are considered drug traffickers and are liable to be punished with an automatic death penalty. In rare cases, permission has been granted to use cannabis-derived pharmaceuticals for treatment of epilepsy.
Slovakia	Illegal	CBD only	Main article: Cannabis in Slovakia Possession of small amounts punishable by up to 8 years in prison.
Slovenia	Decriminalized	Legal	Main article: Cannabis in Slovenia Medical cannabis legalized in 2025. Prior to 2025, cannabis-based drugs were legal for medicinal use, but not cannabis itself. Possession of any drug for personal use is decriminalized.
Solomon Islands	Illegal	Illegal	Main article: Cannabis in the Solomon Islands
Somalia	Illegal	Illegal	Main article: Cannabis in Somalia
South Africa	Legal for possession, cultivation and use in private places but not for sale.	Use is legal, but no system for the dispensing of medicinal cannabis exists.	Main article: Cannabis in South Africa Private use and cultivation have been legal for those 18 years and older since September 2018.
South Sudan	Illegal	Illegal	
Spain	Decriminalized. Use and possession in private areas allowed for own consumption. Public possession or consumption can result in a fine. Cultivation for personal use allowed in private areas including Cannabis Social Clubs.	Legal	Main article: Cannabis in Spain All actions related to cannabis for own consumption aren't considered criminal offenses, but misdemeanors punishable by a fine. Cannabis trafficking, including sale, import, or cultivation for sale, is punishable by jail time. Cannabis was legalized in Catalonia in 2017 for those 18 and over, but that law was challenged by the Spanish state and declared unconstitutional in 2018. Cultivation in private areas for own consumption is allowed if the plants cannot be seen from the street or other public spaces.
Sri Lanka	Illegal	Legalized by amendment made in colonial law by 1980s and through the Ayurveda Act.	Main article: Cannabis in Sri Lanka The sale of cannabis is decriminalized for traditional medicine vendors and it is commonly used in Ayurvedic traditional medicines.
Sudan	Illegal	Illegal	Main article: Cannabis in Sudan
Suriname	Illegal	Illegal	Main article: Cannabis in Suriname Cannabis was banned in Suriname in the early 20th century, having been popularized there by Asian immigrants.
Sweden	Illegal	Legal under limited circumstances for patients who obtain a license.	Main article: Cannabis in Sweden All cannabis-related activity illegal. The national police runs a "disturb and annoy" program aimed at users supported by the national "zero tolerance" policy.
Switzerland	Decriminalized. Legal below 1.0% THC.	Legal	Main article: Cannabis in Switzerland Since 2017, consuming cannabis in Switzerland may result in a fine, but possession of up to 10 g (3/8 oz) without evidence of consumption is not penalized; and as of 2023, confiscated amounts under this limit must be returned to the individual.
Syria	Illegal, widely unenforced since the start of the Syrian civil war	Illegal	Main article: Cannabis in Syria If someone is considered an addict by the Syrian government then they face no criminal penalties for drug possession.
Taiwan	Illegal	Illegal	Main article: Cannabis in Taiwan Cannabis is a schedule 2 narcotic in the ROC, and possession can result in up to 3 years imprisonment.
Tajikistan	Illegal	Illegal	Main article: Cannabis in Tajikistan
Tanzania	Illegal	Illegal	Main article: Cannabis in Tanzania
Thailand	Illegal but often unenforced	Legal	Main article: Cannabis in Thailand Criminalized in 1935, medical use legalized in 2018. Recreational use legalized in 2022 for those aged 20 and over. Unprescribed products with over 0.2% THC were recriminalized in 2025, but this law is often unenforced.
Timor-Leste	Illegal	Illegal	Main article: Cannabis in Timor-Leste
Togo	Illegal	Illegal	Main article: Cannabis in Togo
Tonga	Illegal	Illegal	Main article: Cannabis in Tonga
Trinidad and Tobago	Decriminalized up to 30 g (1 1/16 oz), cultivation of 4 plants per adult	Illegal	Main article: Cannabis in Trinidad and Tobago Banned in 1925. Decriminalized in 2019.
Tunisia	Illegal	Illegal	Main article: Cannabis in Tunisia Banned in 1953. Using or possessing entails 1–5 years of imprisonment and 1000–3000 dinars (around $500–1500).
Turkey	Illegal	Cannabis-derived drugs less than 0.3% THC can be prescribed	Main article: Cannabis in Turkey Medical grade cannabis containing less than 0.3% THC legalized in 2025. Recreational use is illegal and is punishable by 1 year of probation while repetition is punishable by 2 years of probation and enforced treatment. Sale and supply is punishable by a prison term of 5–10 years, and production or trafficking by a minimum term of 10 years.
Turkmenistan	Illegal	Illegal	Main article: Cannabis in Turkmenistan
Tuvalu	Illegal	Illegal	Main article: Cannabis in Tuvalu
Uganda	Illegal	Illegal	Main article: Cannabis in Uganda
Ukraine	Illegal	Legal	Main article: Cannabis in Ukraine In December 2023, Parliament adopted a bill to legalize medical cannabis on second reading. It was signed into law by President Zelenskyy on 15 February 2024.
United Arab Emirates	Illegal	Illegal	Main article: Cannabis in the United Arab Emirates In 2008, even the smallest amounts of the drug could lead to a mandatory 4-year prison sentence.
United Kingdom	Illegal, but a cannabis warning or an on-the-spot fine ("Penalty Notice for Disorder") may be issued instead of prosecution for simple possession.	Cannabis-derived medicines may be prescribed only by a specialist consultant.	Main article: Cannabis in the United Kingdom Banned in 1928. A class B drug under the Misuse of Drugs Act 1971. Limited medical use legal since 1 November 2018 when prescribed by a specialist consultant, not a GP. Guidance: only prescribe when clearly beneficial and no other option available.
United States	Legalized in 24 states, 3 territories, and the District of Columbia – but illegal at federal level under Schedule I. Decriminalized in another 7 states. See also: Legalization of non-medical cannabis in the United States	Legalized in 41 states, 4 territories, and the District of Columbia – Schedule III at the federal level. See also: Medical cannabis in the United States	Main articles: Cannabis in the United States and Legality of cannabis by U.S. jurisdiction See also: Cannabis on American Indian reservations Cannabis remains a Schedule I drug at federal level, allowing its medical use under Schedule III with narrow exceptions. The Rohrabacher–Farr amendment prevents federal enforcement in states that have legalized medical marijuana, however. No such protections exist regarding recreational, but the federal government has so far generally not intervened. Recognized Indian reservations are allowed to legalize for either use under a policy announced in 2014. Every U.S. state that has legalized recreational use has set a mandatory legal minimum age of 21 for purchase, possession, and use. On April 23, 2026, the Drug Enforcement Administration and the Department of Justice moved medical marijuana to Schedule III.
Uruguay	Legal, but buying prohibited for non-residents. Cultivation allowed up to six plants. Cannabis Social Clubs authorized up to 45 members	Legal for all uses.	Main article: Cannabis in Uruguay Legal since 2013. Buyers must be at least 18 years old, residents of Uruguay, and must register with the authorities. Authorities grow the cannabis that can be sold legally. Non-profit Cannabis Clubs can also operate.
Uzbekistan	Illegal	Illegal	Main article: Cannabis in Uzbekistan Opiates, cannabis and other plants containing psychotropic substances are illegal.
Vanuatu	Illegal	Legal	Main article: Cannabis in Vanuatu
Vatican City	Illegal	Illegal	
Venezuela	Illegal	Illegal	Main article: Cannabis in Venezuela Possession of up to 20 g (3/4 oz) of marijuana or 5 g (3/16 oz) of genetically modified marijuana for commercial purposes is punishable by 1–2 years in prison at judge's discretion. If deemed to be for personal consumption, the user is subject to security measures involving rehabilitation and detoxification procedures.
Vietnam	Illegal	Illegal	Main article: Cannabis in Vietnam
Yemen	Illegal	Illegal	Main article: Cannabis in Yemen
Zambia	Illegal	Legal	Main article: Cannabis in Zambia
Zimbabwe	Illegal	Legal	Main article: Cannabis in Zimbabwe
Country/Territory	Recreational	Medical	Notes

== See also ==
- Annual cannabis use by country
- Adult lifetime cannabis use by country
- Harm reduction
- Minors and the legality of cannabis
- Timeline of cannabis law
- War on drugs
