= Cannabis in Denmark =

Legality of cannabis in Europe Legal for recreational use by adults Legal for medical use under certain conditions by adults Illegal

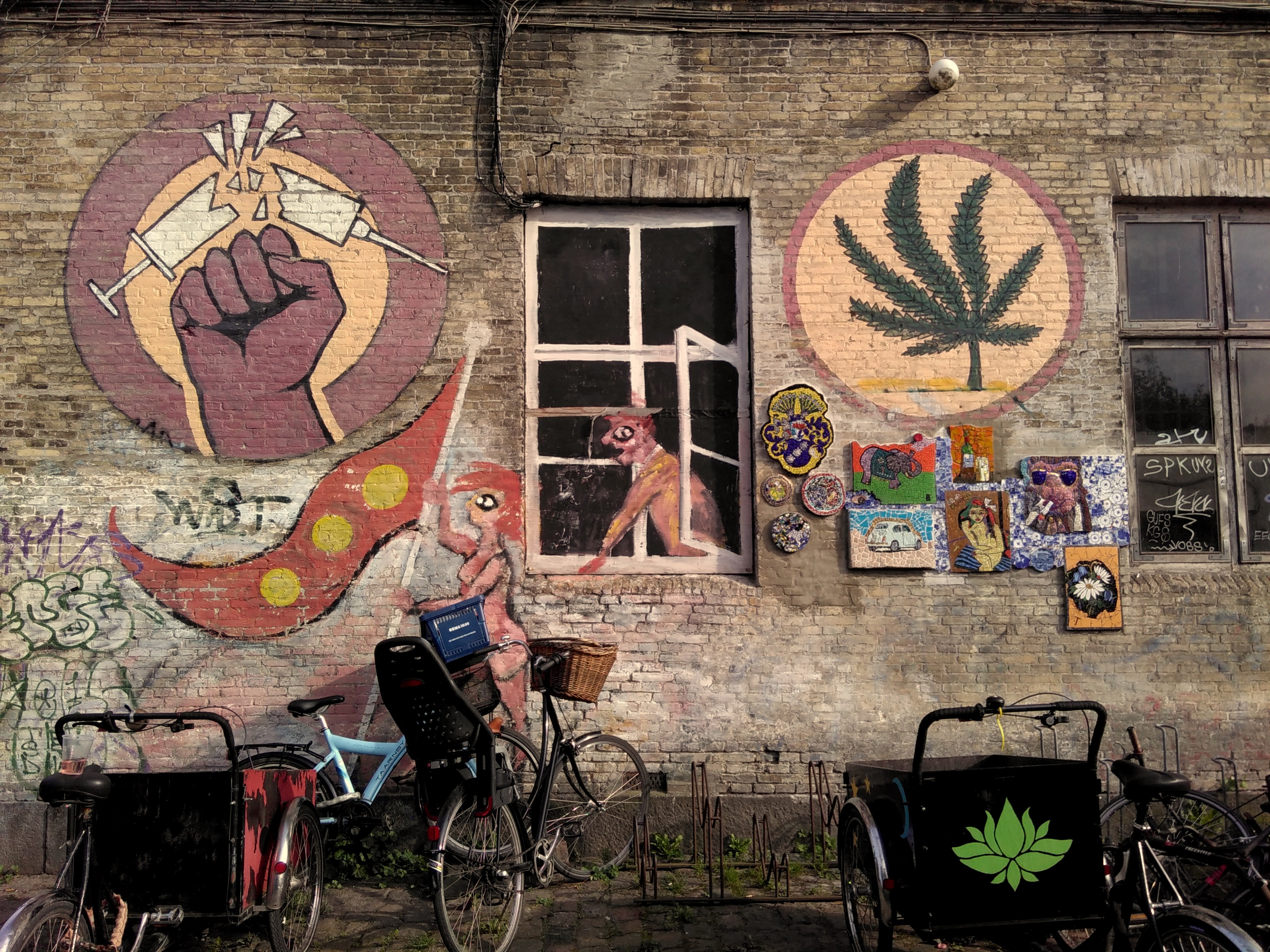
Pro-cannabis and anti-heroin mural in Christiania, pictured in September 2016

Cannabis in Denmark is illegal for recreational use, but medical use is allowed through a four-year pilot program initiated in January 2018. However seeds from cannabis plants are legal to sell and possess but they are illegal to grow.

Cannabis sale and use, while illegal, has been unofficially tolerated in the Copenhagen neighborhood of Freetown Christiania. The neighborhood was unsure about the cannabis trade after a 2016 shooting, but decided to ultimately keep it. However, lately, a Danish company is going to be the first Cannabis company to launch an IPO.

== Penalties ==
The punishment for small amounts (up to 9.9 g or 0.35 oz) for personal use is typically a fine. In certain cases such as socially vulnerable people, a warning can be given instead of a fine. Larger quantities (more than 100 g or 3.5 oz) generally results in a prison sentence. Driving under the influence of cannabis is illegal and all but the smallest amounts of THC in a blood sample results in a fine and loss of the driver's license (conditional or unconditional).

== Usage ==
Despite its illegal status, a 2015 report by the European Monitoring Centre for Drugs and Drug Addiction shows that slightly more than 1/3 of adult Danes have tried cannabis at some point in their life, which is above the European average where only France is positioned higher. Based on the same study, less than 7% have used cannabis in the last year, which also is above European average, but almost the same as Finland and the United Kingdom, and below the Czech Republic, France, Italy, the Netherlands and Spain.

== Politics ==
Danish political parties are split on the legality of cannabis for recreational use: Red-Green Alliance, Socialist People's Party, Liberal Alliance and The Alternative support legalization, while the Social Democrats, Danish People's Party, Conservatives and Venstre are opposed. The Danish Social Liberal Party has traditionally been opposed, but in 2016 the party leader announced that they supported a legalization on a trial basis. The goal of the Cannabis Party is legalization, but the party is marginal, without representation in the Danish Parliament, regional councils, or municipal councils. In contrast to the opposition by the parent parties, both the Social Democrats of Copenhagen (Denmark's capital and a major stronghold of the party) and the youth wing of Venstre support legalization.

The municipal council of Copenhagen has expressed an interest in starting a three-year trial where all adult citizens legally can buy cannabis from certified sellers. The necessary permit has repeatedly been denied by the Government, as this would require a change of the law, which is not supported by a majority in the Danish Parliament.

A poll from 2016 showed that Danes were divided exactly on the middle, with 43% supporting legalization and 43% against (11% "neither"; 3% "don't know").

== Medical cannabis ==
Three types of cannabis derivatives for medical use (Sativex, Marinol and Nabilone) were approved by the Danish Medicines Agency in 2011, but require prescription. These are prescribed primarily for the relief of pain and nausea in cancer patients and to alleviate muscle stiffness in multiple sclerosis patients.

Medical use of whole-plant cannabis is allowed through a four-year pilot program that began in January 2018. Initially it was planned that the cannabis would be imported from other countries (notably the Netherlands) as it was illegal to grow in Denmark, but in 2017 it was decided that Danish farmers would be allowed to grow the plant under secured condition with a special permit.

Polling shows that 88% of Danes support the medical use of cannabis. In Denmark, an NGO named Cannabis Danmark was founded to support cultivation and research of medical cannabis.

Prior to prohibition of cannabis, the plant was used in some typical remedies in Denmark; it was not until 1964 that a Danish factory was ordered to stop making a clavus (corn) liniment from cannabis extract.

== Freetown Christiania ==
Since its opening, Freetown Christiania has been famous for its open cannabis trade, taking place in the centrally located Pusher Street, although named Green Light District by the Christianian council. Although the hash trade is illegal, authorities were for many years reluctant to forcibly stop it. Proponents thought that concentrating the hash trade at one place would limit its dispersion in society, and that it could prevent users from switching to 'harder drugs'. Some wanted to legalize hash altogether. Opponents thought the ban should be enforced, in Christiania as elsewhere, and that there should be no differentiation between 'soft' and 'hard' drugs. It has also been claimed that the open cannabis trade was one of Copenhagen's major tourist attractions, while some said it scared other potential tourists away. Even though the police have attempted to stop the drug trade, the cannabis market has generally thrived in Christiania. Following a 2016 shooting, local residents removed the Pusher Street stalls, and it was estimated that the cannabis sale dropped by about 75%. In 2021 cannabis was able to return to openly being sold in Freetown. As of 6 April 2024, residents of Christiania started to remove the cobblestone from Pusher Street in an effort to renovate the street and remove hash sales from the region. This marks the end of a ~40 year period where individuals would openly sell hash on the street, mostly without worry. The residents there have also received a 14.3 million Kroner (1.3 million USD) grant from the government to help fund the street renovation.

== Legal semi-synthetic cannabinoids in Denmark ==
Up until 3 May 2023, Hexahydrocannabinol (HHC) was legal in Denmark and was available for purchase in numerous kiosks as well as on various websites. Following this date, HHC was deemed illegal; however, its more potent derivative, Hexahydrocannabiphorol (HHC-P), continues to be legal. The addition of HHC to the list of illegal substances was executed without a parliamentary majority after the European Monitoring Centre for Drugs and Drug Addiction (EMCDDA) released a report. This report highlighted that the production methods for HHC lacked proper control, leading to a potential contamination of the final product with byproducts. Prompted by this, the Danish Health Authority (Sundhedsstyrelsen) advised Sofie Løhde on the dangers posed by HHC, enabling Sofie Løhde to request the Danish Medicines Agency to include HHC in the list of banned substances.

== See also ==
- Cannabis in Greenland
