= Cannabis in Antigua and Barbuda =

Cannabis in Antigua and Barbuda is illegal but decriminalized. The islands are not a major producer of cannabis, and instead import the drug from Jamaica and Saint Vincent and the Grenadines.

== Decriminalization ==
In March 2018, the Misuse of Drugs (Amendment) Act, 2018 amended the Misuse of Drugs Act to state that "a person who is in possession of a maximum of 15 grams of the drug Cannabis or Cannabis resin is not guilty of an offence." The amendment stopped short of legalizing the drug as it does not remove legal penalties for the sale of cannabis.

== Legalization ==
Ryan Johnson, legislative drafter and editor of the government's Official Gazette, stated that a new bill is in the works that would permit cannabis sales under certain circumstances.
