= Chokwan Chopaka =

Thai cannabis rights activist

Chokwan Kitty Chopaka is a Thai cannabis rights activist and entrepreneur. She is known for her advocacy and campaigns for the legalization of Cannabis in Thailand.

== Early life and career ==
Chokwan Kitty Chopaka spent much of her youth in Australia, but returned to Thailand to attend Bangkok University where she holds a Bachelor's of Business Administration with a major in Entrepreneurship. After her education, she managed a law firm briefly in Bangkok. Chopaka left the firm to pursue multiple entrepreneurial endeavors which led to becoming more involved in cannabis activism that leaned on her legal knowledge and skills. She founded the company Elevated Estate, a cannabis-focused startup incubator in Thailand in 2019.

Chopaka then founded the Chopaka brand, a company that manufactures Terpene Gummies sold throughout Asia. Her first flagship store was opened in Bangkok before legalization as an outlet for gummies and other terpene products. She subsequently added flowers after cannabis was legalized.

She is known for collaborating with government departments and companies in Thailand and the Czech Republic and has advised politicians from Australia and surrounding Asian countries. She also serves as an advisor to the Thailand Cannabis Act Drafting Committee in 2022. In 2019, she was awarded the Jack Herer award of Free Fighter for her contributions in Cannabis activism. She is often quoted by Times magazine, Reuters and other media outlets on issues of Cannabis.

She is a frequent speaker on several issues surrounding Cannabis, she has spoken at Global Cannabis Justice Exchange Forum, Czech Presidency of the Council of the European Union, EU National Drug Coordinator Meeting and other panels. She has led and organized several protest including the Thai Cannabis Day on 6 June and “Refusal to Re-criminalizing Cannabis Letter of Intent Collection to be Submitted to the Next Minister of Public Health. She also led the protest for the Cannabis Act at the Parliament House of Thailand. In November 2022, she also led a protest for Refusal to Re-criminalizing Cannabis Protest at the Government House of Thailand.
