= Cannabis in Congo =

Cannabis in Congo may refer to:

- Cannabis in the Democratic Republic of the Congo
- Cannabis in the Republic of the Congo
