= Cannabis in Barbados =

In Barbados, cannabis is illegal for recreational use, but is in high demand nonetheless. Cannabis is sourced from St. Vincent and Jamaica by local dealers who pool resources to buy consignments of the drug, transported by go-fast boats.

Medical use of cannabis was legalized in November 2019 through the Medicinal Cannabis Industry Bill. A prescription by a licensed doctor is required. In June 2025, the first and only Medicinal Cannabis dispensary, Island Therapeutics Inc. A second bill that was passed, the Sacramental Cannabis Bill, allows the spiritual use of cannabis by registered Rastafarians.

== Law on Possession of marijuana ==
The law says that a person with up to 14 grams of cannabis or ganja is subject to a $200 fine. This fine must be paid within 30 days. In general, criminal charges are not imposed by the law. The Law of Barbados is strict for cannabis.

In addition, if authorities capture any young person under 18 with half an ounce or less of marijuana, they will be referred to the National Council on Drug Abuse for therapy.

People who are unable to pay are frequently ordered to perform community service.

Marijuana cultivation is prohibited, and the offender was sentenced to 5 years in jail.

== See also ==
- Legality of cannabis
- Drug liberalization
