= Cannabis in Botswana =

- Location of Botswana (dark green)
- Medicinal: Legal
- Recreational: Illegal

Cannabis is legal in Botswana for medicinal, scientific, research and industrial purposes within the licensed framework established by the Cannabis Act, 2025. Recreational use remains illegal. The Cannabis Regulations, 2026 impose licensing and security requirements on activities including cultivation, manufacture, transportation, import and export. Before the 2025 liberalisation, cannabis was generally prohibited under the Drugs and Related Substances Act, 1992.

Cannabis is commonly known as motekwane or by the Khoesan word dagga.
