= Cannabis in Ecuador =

Cannabis in Ecuador is illegal for personal recreational consumption as of November 24, 2023. Previously amounts up to 10 grams were allowed, however President Noboa repealed the act allowing possession as part of a campaign promise designed to reduce “micro trafficking”.

Cannabis for medical purposes was legalized by the National Assembly of Ecuador in September 2019 by an 83 to 23 vote. It is unclear as to whether this has changed due to removal of the Ecuadorian Drug Table.

== Laws ==
=== Laws on possession of weed ===
Punishment for personal consumption is unclear as of November 24th 2023, it is however now illegal (recreationally) in any amount.

=== Laws on Selling Marijuana ===
Cannabis cannot be sold in Ecuador. However, the law prohibits the selling of cannabis for any reason. Instead, such offenses carry a lengthy jail term.

Law 108 of 1991 imposed a ten-year jail sentence. However, the application of the law has remained the same. For example, if someone is charged with other marijuana-related offenses, such as cultivation or drug trafficking, they may still face up to 25 years in prison.

=== Laws on Cannabis Cultivation ===
Cannabis cultivation is not commonly practiced in Ecuador. It is mostly a transit nation. As a result, the number of marijuana cultivators is significantly lower than in other South American nations.

Cannabis production is only permitted in Ecuador for personal use.

However, in the prosecution's view, everyone who grows plants for his use is not a criminal, Where CBD is currently legal in Ecuador.
