= Cannabis in Uganda =

Cannabis in Uganda is regulated under the Narcotic Drugs and Psychotropic Substances (Control) Act of 2015, which prohibits recreational use while permitting cultivation, processing and export of cannabis for medical and scientific purposes under licence. Recreational possession, cultivation and trade remain criminal offences. In May 2023, Uganda's Constitutional Court nullified the 2015 Act on procedural grounds, ruling that Parliament had lacked the required quorum when passing it; the decision was widely reported internationally as having legalised cannabis, but the Ugandan Judiciary subsequently clarified that this had not been the Court's intent.

The plant is referred to locally as njaga or shada.

== History ==
Cannabis is not native to Africa, but is believed to have been cultivated on the continent for at least a thousand years, having spread westward from Asia. A 1902 ethnological survey of eastern Uganda by Charles William Hobley recorded that cannabis was used in the region, smoked through a water pipe, and that its use was restricted to adult men, with younger men of fighting age prohibited from consuming it.

In 1902, the British colonial administration prohibited the production of "opium" in Uganda, with the term defined to include "the preparation known as bhang, ganja, churus, and chandoo natron". This was part of a wider pattern of colonial-era cannabis prohibitions across British and other European territories in Africa, which were typically embedded within broader legislative frameworks rather than enacted as standalone drug laws. The international Geneva Opium Convention of 1925 brought cannabis under formal international control for the first time, and the framework was inherited and largely retained by independent African states after the mid-twentieth-century wave of decolonisation.

In 2015, Uganda's Parliament passed the Narcotic Drugs and Psychotropic Substances (Control) Act, which maintained the prohibition of recreational cannabis while establishing a framework for the cultivation, processing and export of cannabis for medical and scientific purposes under licence. By the early 2020s more than ninety domestic and foreign companies had reportedly applied for cultivation licences, although only a small number had been issued. Domestic critics of liberalisation included First Lady Janet Museveni, who described cannabis as harmful to young Ugandans, while the Ugandan businessman Sudhir Ruparelia publicly lobbied President Yoweri Museveni in support of large-scale cultivation for export.

In May 2023, Uganda's Constitutional Court, sitting in Kampala, nullified the 2015 Narcotic Drugs and Psychotropic Substances (Control) Act on procedural grounds, ruling that Parliament had lacked the required quorum when passing it. The petition had been brought by the Wakiso Miraa Growers and Dealers Association. Although the decision was widely reported internationally as having legalised cannabis in Uganda, the Ugandan Judiciary subsequently issued a press statement clarifying that the ruling was procedural in nature and that it had not been the Court's intent to legalise cannabis.

Academic research on the country's cannabis economy has expanded in parallel. The Cannabis Africana project, jointly run by the universities of Bristol and Cape Town and funded by the UK Economic and Social Research Council, has examined the place of cannabis in several African countries, including Uganda, and has highlighted concerns that high licensing fees and capital requirements risk excluding smallholder cultivators from the emerging legal medicinal sector.

== Cultivation ==
Although cannabis is grown all across the country, the total cultivated area, based on the 1998 International Narcotics Control Strategy Report, is less than 5,000 hectares (12,000 acres). Locally known as bhang, it is believed to be the only drug grown in Uganda. Cultivation is most prevalent in eastern Uganda, especially in Bugiri, Busia, Iganga, Kayunga, Mayuge, and Mukono. Ugandan cannabis is mainly smuggled to neighbouring African countries like the Democratic Republic of Congo and Sudan.

== Legality ==
The Narcotic Drugs and Psychotropic Substances (Control) Act of 2015 criminalises recreational possession, cultivation and trade of cannabis, while providing a licensing framework for medical and scientific cultivation, processing and export. In May 2023, the Constitutional Court nullified the Act on procedural grounds following a petition by the Wakiso Miraa Growers and Dealers Association, ruling that Parliament had lacked quorum when the legislation was passed. The Ugandan Judiciary subsequently issued a press statement clarifying that the ruling was procedural in nature and was not intended to legalise cannabis.d. The 2010 International Narcotics Control Strategy Report highlighted that there were only two detection dogs for conducting drug searches and no drug test kits or X-ray machines to detect drugs, along with the fact that the local police were both corrupt and inadequately trained. From 2008 to 2010, the government's Anti-Narcotics Unit (ANU) seized 5 kilograms (11 lb) of cannabis and officially arrested some 482 people for possession of the drug. The ANU also reported that 15 acres (6.1 ha) of cannabis plants were destroyed from 2008 to 2009.

The export of cannabis for medicinal purposes was approved by the Ugandan Ministry of Health in January 2020, which stipulated among other things that all cannabis exporters had to have a minimum capital of one million US dollars plus $5 million as reserve capital. Prior to this, however, Industrial Hemp Uganda, a private company based in Hima, Kasese District, had already been exporting medicinal cannabis to Germany and China.

In July 2025, the Ugandan government granted an experimental licence to Bright Sparks Farm Limited to cultivate, process, and export medicinal cannabis. The licence, issued under police supervision, covers operations in Nakasongola and Luweero Districts.
