= Cannabis in Rwanda =

- Location of Rwanda (dark green)
- Medicinal: Illegal
- Recreational: Illegal

Cannabis in Rwanda is legal for medicinal purposes, but illegal for recreational purposes.

== History ==
A 1959–1960 study showed that cannabis use in Rwanda at the time was confined to the minority Twa people. Negative associations of cannabis with violence, and with the low social status of the Twa and some other people, resulted in its usage being confined to that ethnic group.

== Reform ==
In 2010 the Minister of Health proposed a law to allow cannabis to be used for medical purposes in the country. In 2021, Rwanda passed an order making cannabis for medicinal purposes legal.
