= Cannabis in Sri Lanka =

- Location of Sri Lanka (dark green)
- Medicinal: Legal
- Recreational: Illegal
- Spiritual: Legal
- Hemp: Legal

Cannabis in Sri Lanka is legally sold through Ayurveda herbal shops, and can be used for medical and scientific purposes if given a license by the Ministry of Health. For recreational usage cannabis is not legal. However, cannabis plays a major role in the traditional culture of the island, with the specific Sinhalese or Sanskrit names virapati (“hero-leaved”), capta (“light-hearted”), ananda (“bliss”), trilok kamaya (“desired in three worlds”) and harshini (“the rejoicers”) indicating its various properties, such as inducing euphoria and heightening sexual energy.

Locally the term 'kansa' is used to refer to the plant as a whole, while 'ganja' is used to refer to the flowering head. It is estimated that there are currently about 600,000 users of cannabis in the country, who tend to come from higher socio-economic strata.

== Legality ==
Recreational	Medicinal	Cultivation
Ayurvedic	Yes	Government license required

The Poisons, Opium and Dangerous Drugs Ordinance of 1935 of the British colonial government criminalised cannabis. An amendment to the law means that cannabis is not criminalised for medical purposes.

The Ayurveda Act (Act No. 31 of 1961 as amended by Act No. 5 of 1962) allows ayurvedic physicians to obtain opium and cannabis for manufacture of their medicinal preparations.

The main aim of local police in dealing with cannabis has been to target vendors who sell to minors or have positioned themselves near minors (such as at a school). Possession of less than 5 kg of cannabis is treated as a minor crime, with fines or short jail sentences. Sri Lanka's Prison System actively tries to rehabilitate drug users.

The Ayurvedic Drugs Corporation (Ministry of Health) is the only legal source for cannabis on the island, and it mostly obtains the drug from police raids on illegal shipments. The only practitioners that are legally allowed to sell the drug are Ayurvedic ones, of which there are estimated to be around 16,000 practitioners.

=== Medical Cannabis ===
"Hemp" is legally allowed to be used on the island as a herb. The colonial law criminalising cannabis has been amended to ensure that nothing "shall affect the lawful import, export, supply, manufacture, use, or possession of galenical preparations (extract and tincture) of the hemp plant". Cannabis is not criminalised for medical purposes.

== History ==
Cannabis was historically traded by the Arabs along the southern Silk Route as early as the 13th century. Hemp was found in Sri Lanka at least as early as the 17th century, when Fernão de Queyroz observed: "there is little hemp, because only a little of it is cultivated."

The Colonial Dutch criminalised narcotic trafficking in 1675, though by 1860, long after the island fell under British control, cannabis was widely produced throughout the island, and the country formed part of the production line for opium that was then exported to China.

In 1867, the British colonial government introduced the Opium and Bhang Ordinance, restricting the sale of cannabis to licensed dealers only.

In 1897, the import of bhang or ganja was banned. In 1905, the British colonial government introduced the Indian Hemp Ordinance, which in its 1907 version punished producing, importing, or distributing "Indian hemp" with a 100-rupee fine and up to six months' imprisonment.

The Poisons, Opium and Dangerous Drugs Ordinance of 1935 criminalised cannabis.

In 2008, the Minister for Indigenous Medicine sought limited legalisation of cannabis for medical purposes. The new officeholder in 2013 likewise proposed to amend the Ayurveda Act to recognise the value of cannabis.

In 2017, Sri Lanka announced the intent to create a 400–hectare cannabis plantation near Ingiriya, to provide cannabis for Ayurvedic practitioners, and potentially for export of cannabis remedies to the United States. Currently, Ayurvedic practitioners obtain legal cannabis from the government as a windfall from seized illegal cannabis, which is often old and of poor quality by the time it reaches them.
