= Cannabis in Thailand =

- Location of Thailand (dark green)
- Medicinal: Legal
- Recreational: Decriminalized
- Hemp: Legal

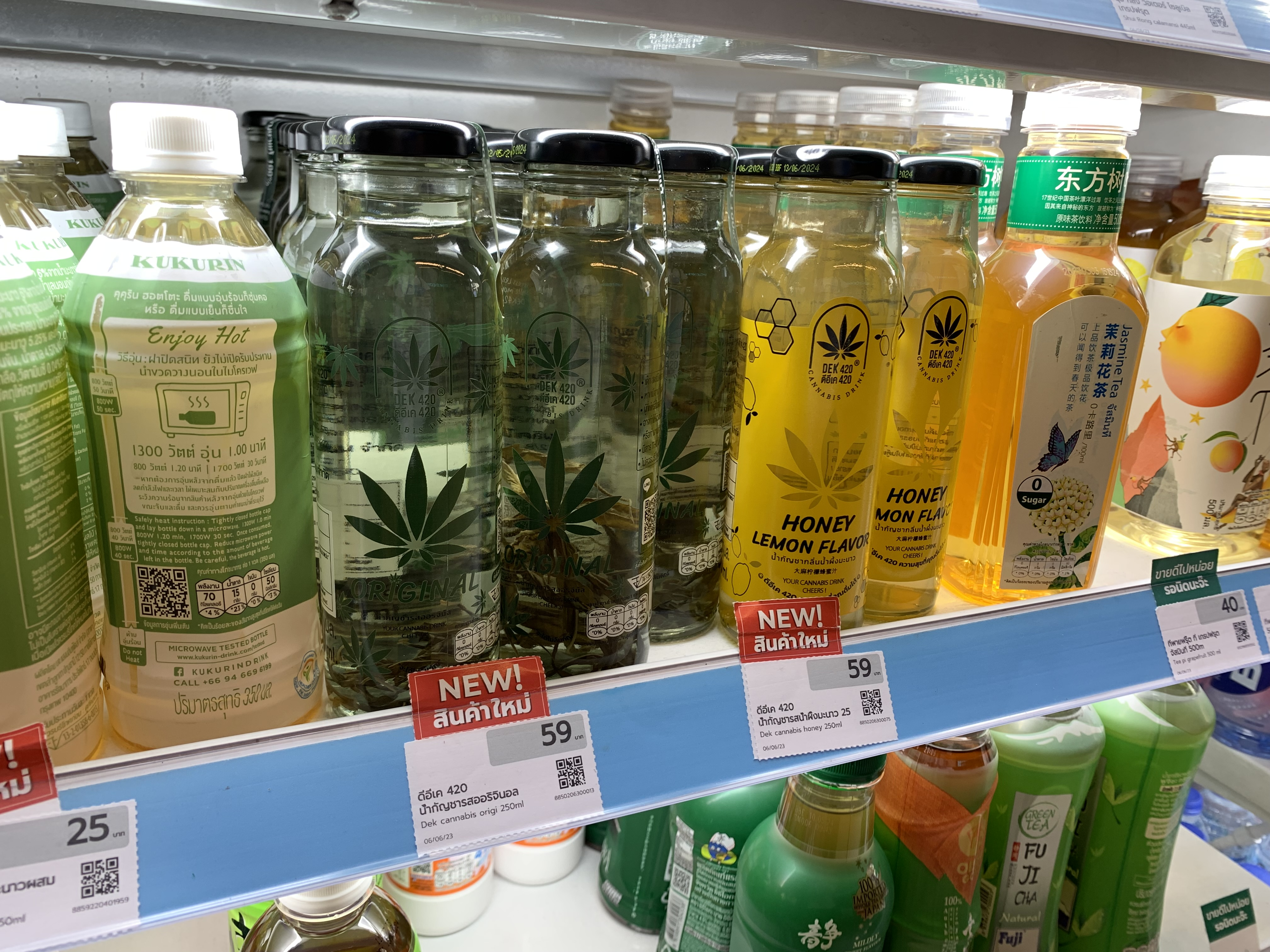
Bottles of cannabis-infused drink on a "healthy drink" shelf of a convenience store in Bangkok, photo taken in 2023

In Thailand, cannabis, known by the name Ganja (Thai: กัญชา; RTGS: kancha), was decriminalised in 2022. Cannabis extracts and products are officially limited to 0.2% tetrahydrocannabinol (THC) content. Only medicinal use is legal, but in practice there is widespread recreational usage, with rules passed in July 2025 aiming to curb that usage.

Import and export of cannabis are still highly regulated.

Sales of cannabis plant parts, products, and edibles are prohibited to minors (under 20-years-old), pregnant women, and breastfeeding women. Cannabis smoke is considered a public nuisance and thus prohibited in public areas. Public use is sometimes subject to fines under the 1992 Public Health Act.

== History ==
Cannabis appears to have been introduced to Thailand from India, with the similarity of the Thai name to the Indian term ganja cited as evidence. Cannabis has historically been used in Southeast Asia as an ingredient, a kitchen condiment, a medicine, and a source of fiber. Laborers were known to use it as a muscle relaxer. It was reportedly used to ease women's labor pains.

== Legal history ==
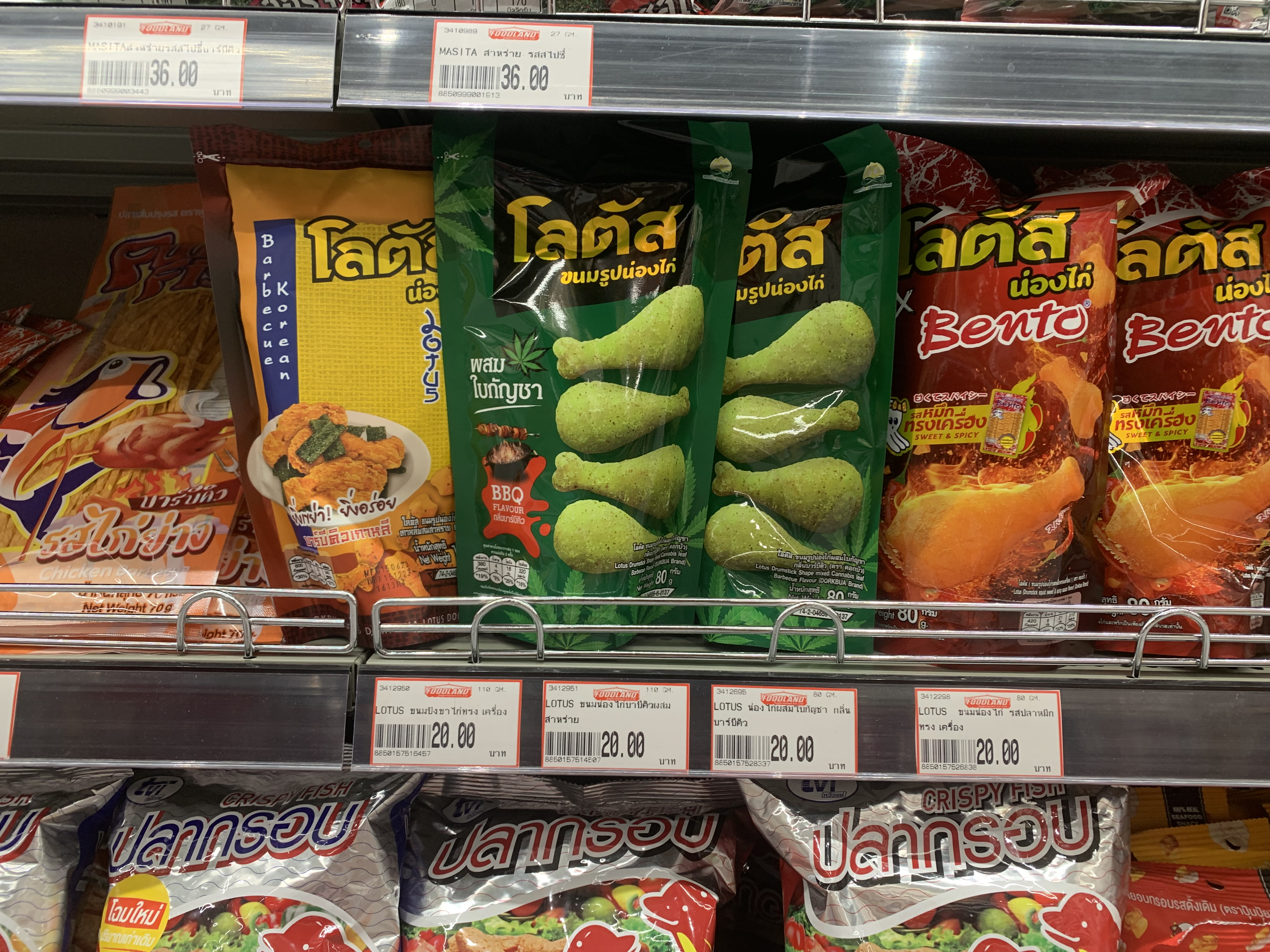
Packages of drumstick-shaped chips claiming to "contain cannabis leaves" sold at a supermarket in Bangkok

The possession, cultivation, sale, and use of cannabis were criminalised by the Cannabis Act 2477 BE (1935) and again by the Narcotics Act 2522 BE (1979).

In 2018, Thailand became the first Asian nation to legalize medical cannabis. Medicinal cannabis, with no tetrahydrocannabinol (THC) restrictions, was made legal but required patients to obtain a prescription from a medical practitioner.

Although medicinal cannabis was decriminalised, consumption, in particular smoking or vaping in public places is still subject to punishment under the Public Health Act 2535 BE (1992) as a public nuisance infraction and can lead to a 25,000 Baht fine.

=== Legality ===
Anutin Charnvirakul, leader of the Bhumjaithai Party, who became Minister of Public Health in 2019, campaigned on the legalization of cannabis and cannabis cultivation in Thailand. On 8 May 2022, he announced in a Facebook post that the government would distribute one million free Cannabis plants to households across the country beginning on 9 June. The initiative was described as a further step in Thailand's plan to use cannabis as a cash crop and to position the country as a regional hub for medical cannabis cultivation and innovation.

In June 2022, the cannabis flower was officially removed from the country's narcotics list, effectively decriminalizing its use and possession. Around 4,200 prisoners were released as a result of the reform, which was hailed as a historic moment in Thai drug policy. Cannabis extracts and cannabis-derived products (including edibles, supplements, and cosmetics) containing less than 0.2% THC were legalized, while those with higher THC content continued to require a medical prescription. The new policy also encouraged small-scale cannabis farming as part of community-based economic development.

Cannabis dispensaries began operating as early as April 2022, and their numbers grew rapidly nationwide. Although all cannabis sales were legally restricted to medical use, dispensaries generally did not require prescriptions from buyers. This created a legal gray area that sparked public debate and prompted calls for clearer legislation governing the sale and use of cannabis for recreational purposes.

On 25 June 2025, shortly after the Bhumjaithai Party withdrew from the ruling coalition amid the 2025 Thai political crisis, Public Health Minister Somsak Thepsuthin of the Pheu Thai Party introduced new regulations classifying the cannabis flower as a controlled herb. The rules prohibited advertising and recreational sales, allowing only medical use under a prescription from a licensed medical doctor, traditional Thai or Chinese medicine practitioner, pharmacist, or dentist. Recreational use of cannabis technically remained decriminalized, although Somsak pledged to push for further restrictions and a possible reclassification of cannabis as a narcotic.

Despite the rollback of some policies, Anutin—widely known as Thailand's "cannabis king" for championing the decriminalization initiative—remained a key political figure. In September 2025, following the collapse of the Paetongtarn Shinawatra's cabinet, he became prime minister of Thailand. As prime minister, Anutin pledged to "strike a balance" between public health and economic interests, signaling potential revisions to cannabis regulations that would preserve medical and industrial benefits while tightening oversight of recreational use.

== Regulations ==
=== Age ===
The minimum age to buy, possess and use cannabis in Thailand is 20-years-old.

=== Consumption ===
Cannabis smoking is legal for personal use in private areas but prohibited in public areas by the Public Health Act 2535 BE (1992) with the fine being up to 25,000 Baht (~US$700) and or imprisonment for up to 3 months.

Cannabis is illegal for possession and use by those who are pregnant and/or breastfeeding, with an exception being granted if they can prove they have the permission of a doctor.

==== Medicinal cannabis ====
Medical cannabis products, including oils and tinctures, with over 0.2% THC requires a prescription for use. This includes consumption by smoking or vaping.

==== Recreational cannabis ====
Recreational cannabis, while technically illegal, was tolerated after the Thai law in 2022, with rules having been tightened in June 2025.

==== Industrial Hemp ====
Cannabis or hemp extracts containing less than 0.2% THC is allowed without any restrictions. The most common CBD products are oils, tinctures, gummies, lotions and balms.

==== Cannabis extracts ====
Cannabis extracts, including hashish, are still considered a Category 5 narcotic as long as they contain over 0.2% THC. On 9 February 2024 it was announced in the Royal Gazette that the possession of more than 30 grams or 30 milliliters is considered as an intent to distribute.

=== Cultivation ===
In order to cultivate cannabis, individuals must register with the country's Food and Drug Administration. There are currently no restrictions on how many plants each individual can cultivate. The specific law regulating cannabis is still pending in Thai parliament as of 2023. However, the government urges people to register their cannabis plantation on the website or the application "Plookganja" (meaning "to plant cannabis") in case that the future cannabis law may require the license.

=== Supply ===
Thai law essentially excludes all foreign companies as well as foreign majority companies incorporated in Thailand from producing, selling, importing, exporting, and processing cannabis. The move has been viewed as an effort to protect local companies from the onslaught of highly resourceful and modern technology equipped foreign actors, however "imported" strains are widely available and dominated the market.

=== Distribution ===
Thailand's first two full-time clinics dispensing cannabis oil for medical treatment were inaugurated in January 2020. The move is in line with the government's intentions to promote licensed use of medical marijuana to address various health conditions. These two clinics are an addition to 25 part-time clinics that are operating since the legalisation of the drug under the new legislation. If this experience produces promising results, the government is all set to open two more clinics as a part of a planned nationwide network of marijuana clinics. The people who were using illegal expensive medical marijuana from underground suppliers are most likely to benefit from it. In addition, the FDA has approved all hospitals of the Public Health Ministry to prescribe medical cannabis to people with approved medical conditions.

As of 2025, Thailand has over 11,200 approved cannabis dispensaries, reflecting a significant expansion of access to medical cannabis in the country. This expansion is part of Thailand's broader strategy to integrate cannabis into healthcare and leverage its potential economic benefits. To legally operate a cannabis dispensary in Thailand, businesses must obtain relevant licenses, including a Cannabis distribution license from the FDA for selling cannabis flowers or leaves. The establishment of a Thai Limited Company with the majority of shares owned by Thai nationals is also required.

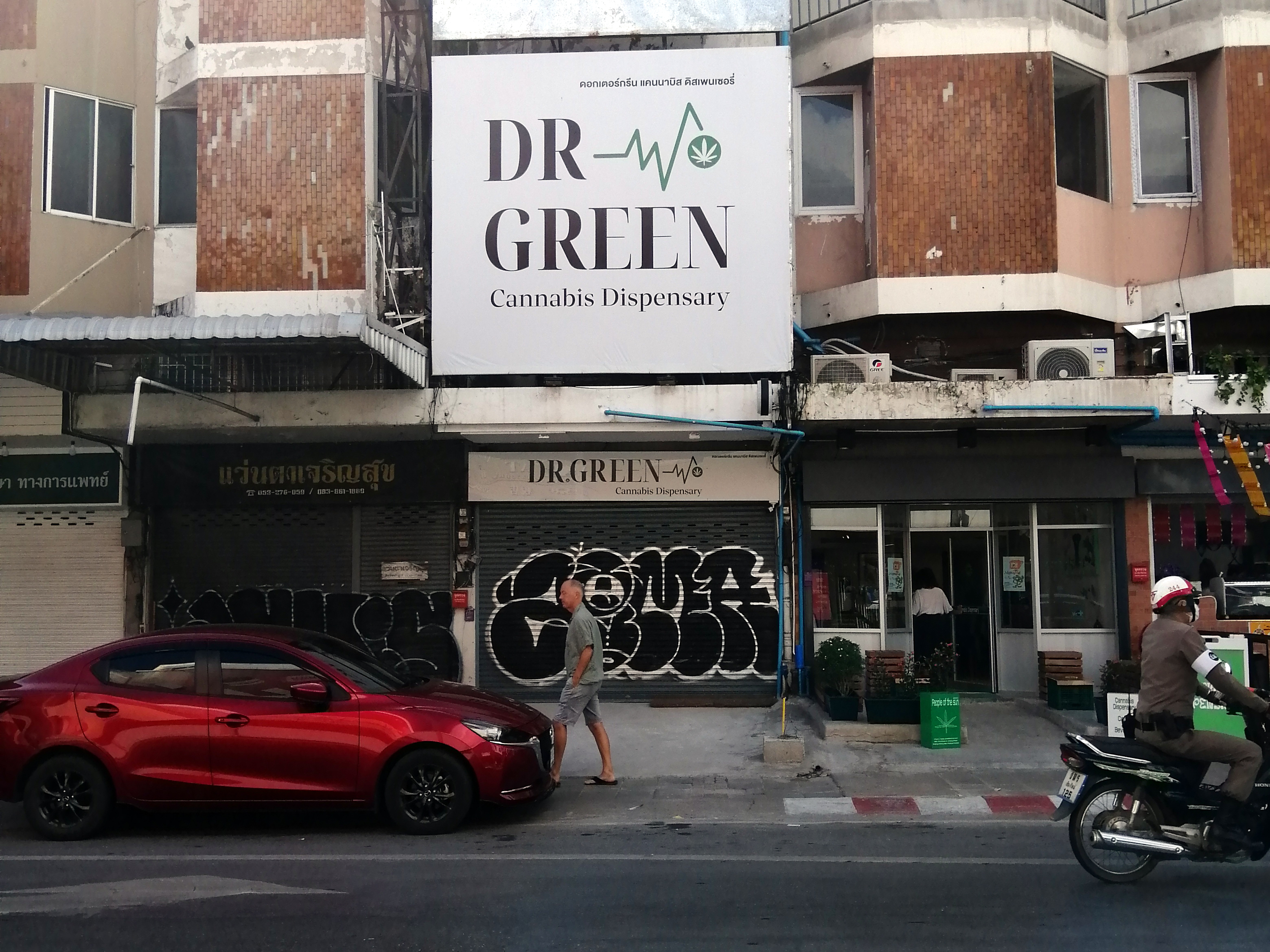
Medical cannabis dispensary clinic in Thailand in 2022.

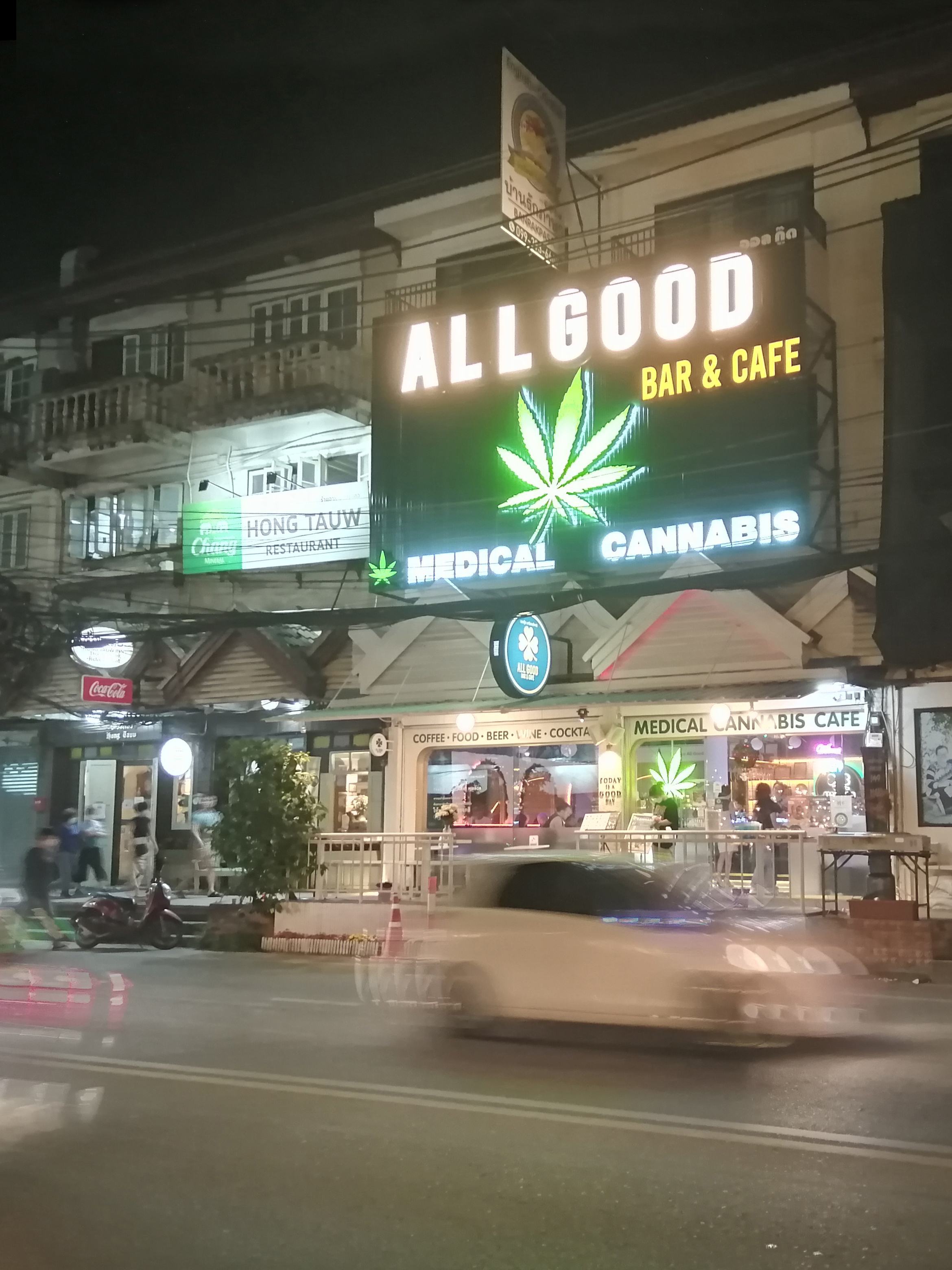
Cannabis bar in Thailand in 2022.

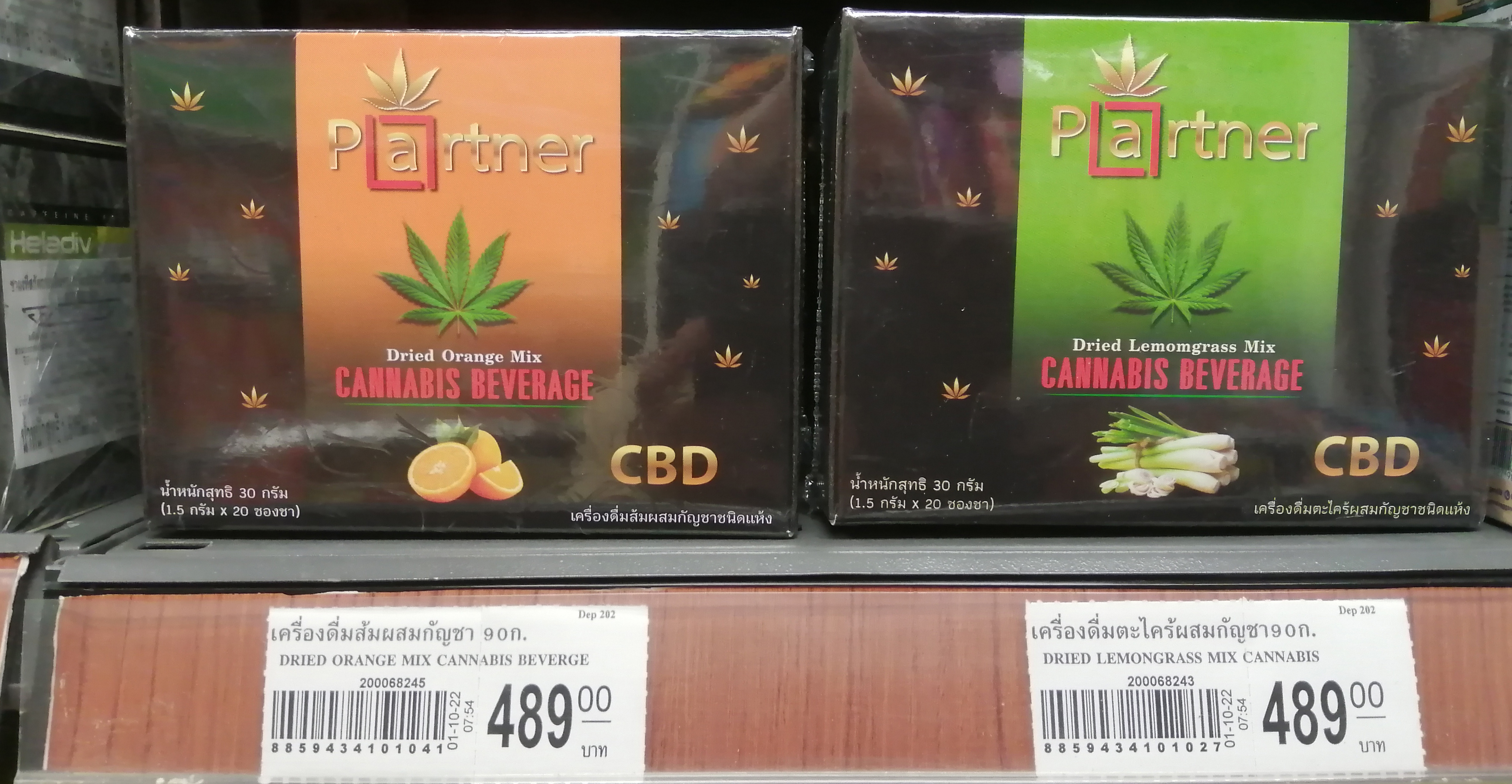
Cannabis edibles sold in a supermarket in Thailand in 2023.

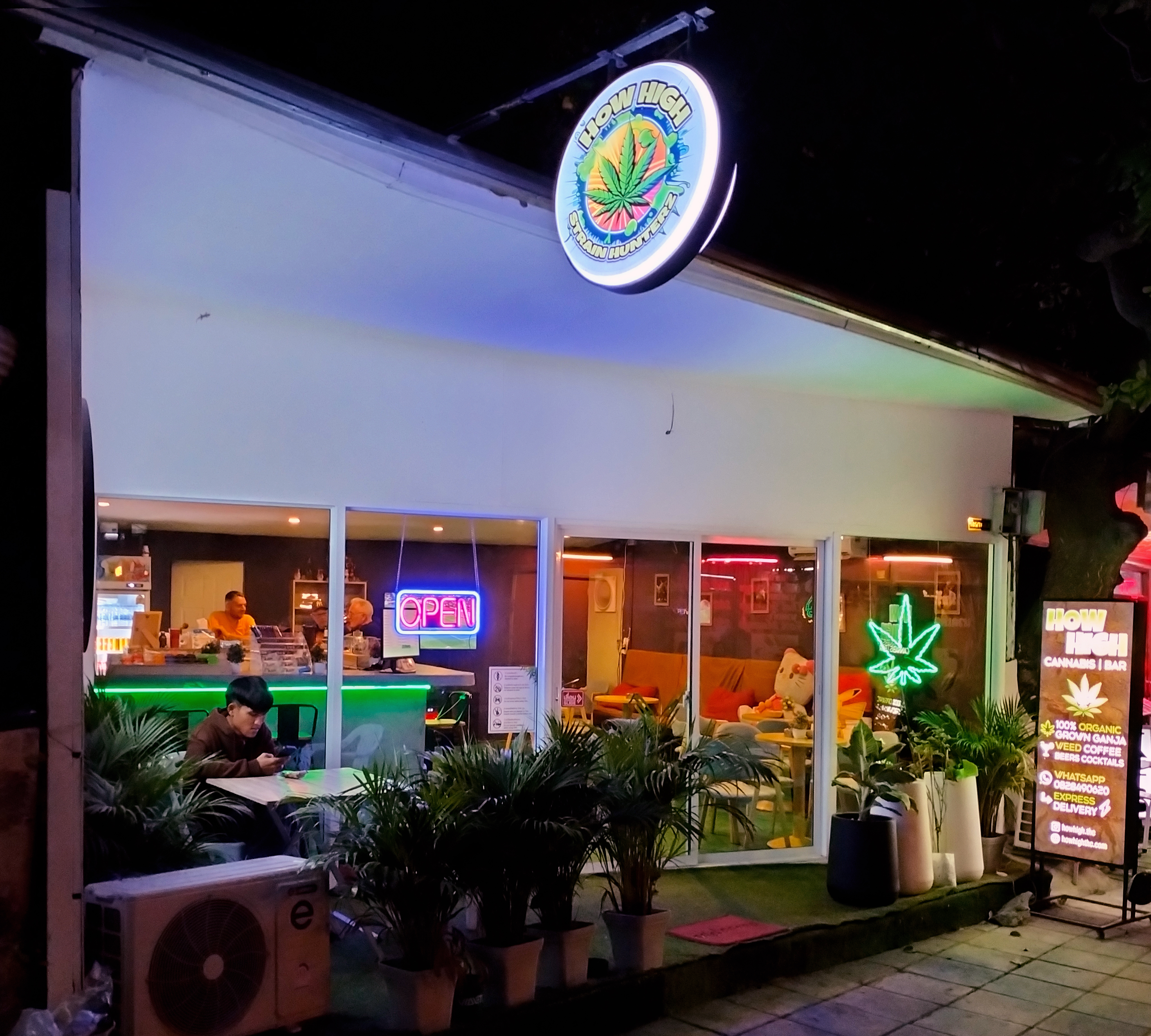
Cannabis shop and bar in Chaweng, Koh Samui, Thailand.

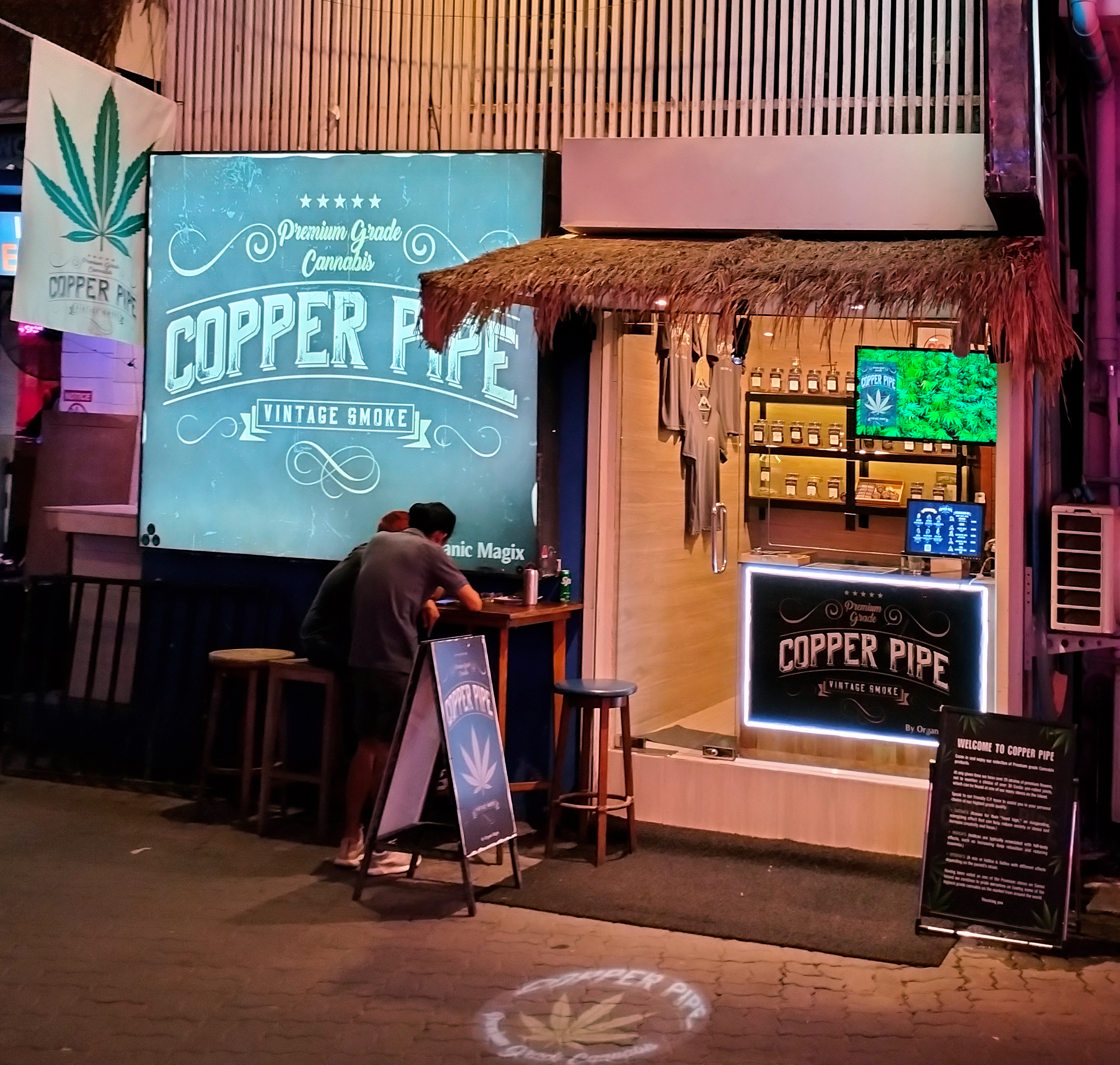
"Copper Pipe", Cannabis shop in Chaweng Beach, Koh Samui, Thailand.

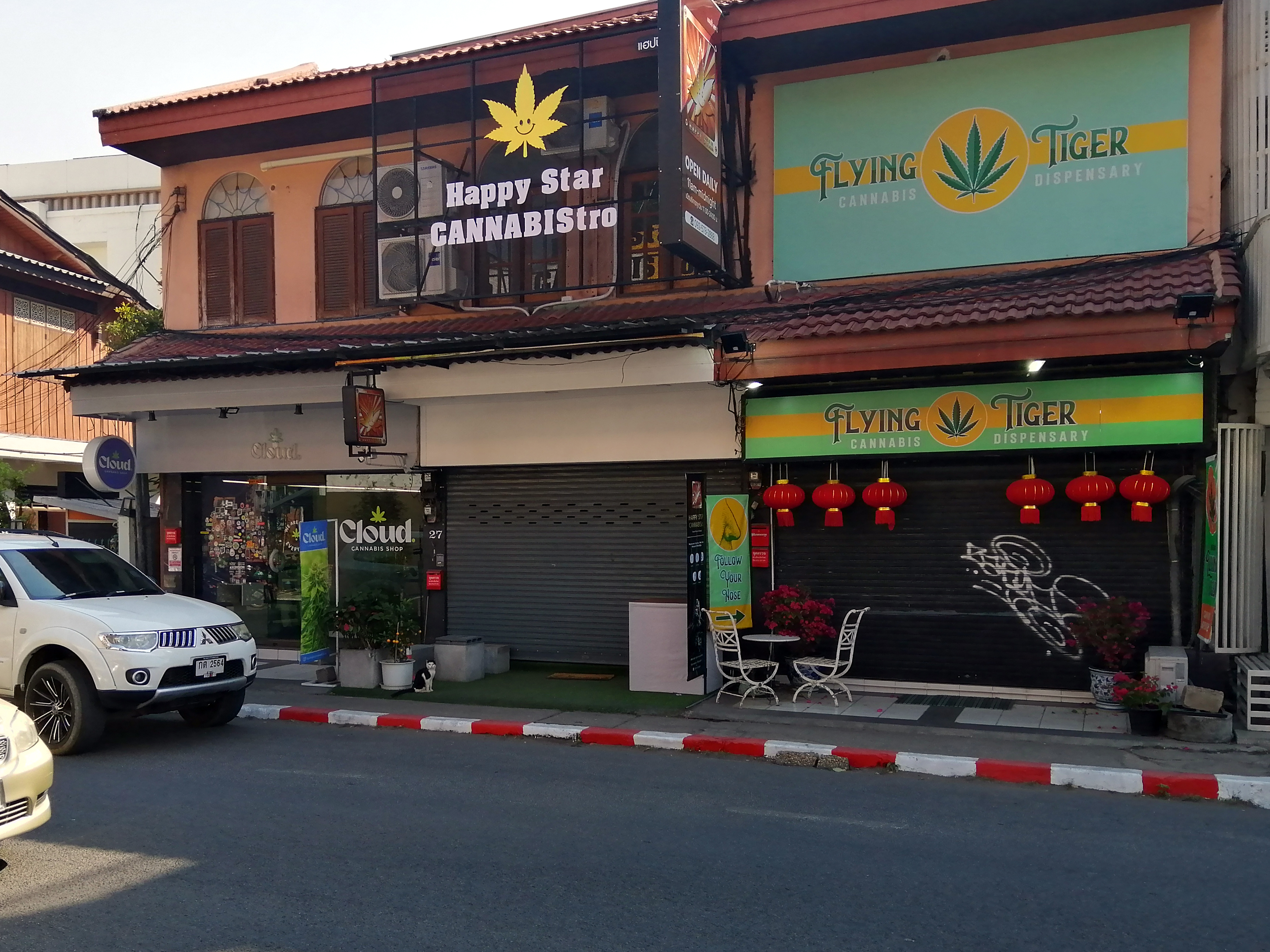
Three neighbouring cannabis outlets.

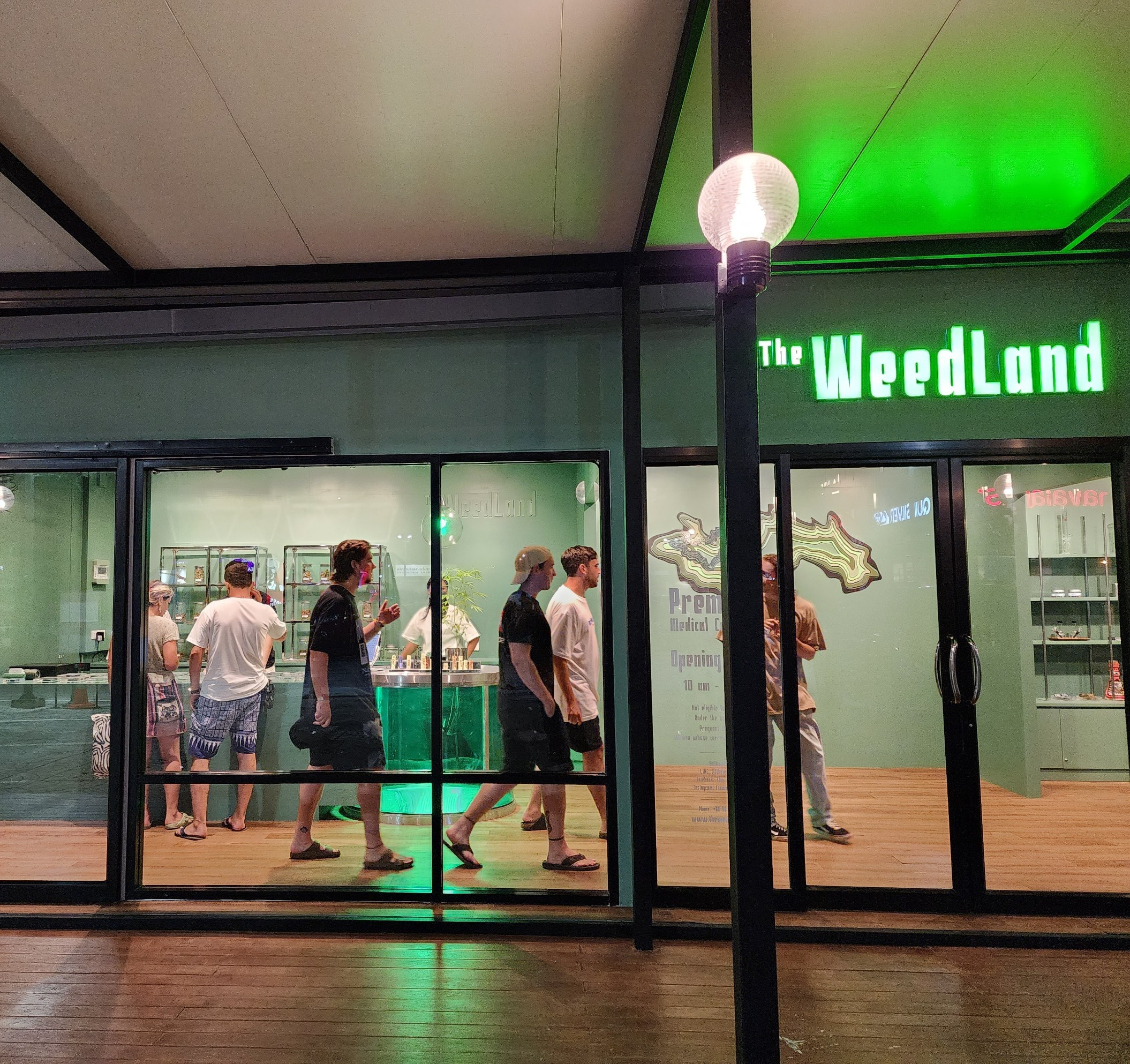
The WeedLand Krabi - Premium Cannabis Dispensary in AoNang
