= Cannabis in North Macedonia =

Legality of cannabis in Europe Legal for recreational use Legal for medical use Illegal

Cannabis in North Macedonia is legal for medical purposes, but illegal for recreational purposes.

== Medical cannabis ==
On February 9, 2016, the Macedonian Parliament Health Committee gave its approval for the legalization of medical marijuana. Beginning in June 2016, patients without a prescription were allowed to buy oil with 0.2 per cent cannabinoids or less; more concentrated forms require prescription.

== Recreational use ==
On November 20 2020, the prime minister Zoran Zaev said the government is looking to legalize the recreational use of marijuana in the country's hospitality places and tourist hotspots, including Skopje and Ohrid. However, Zoran Zaev has no longer been Prime Minister of North Macedonia since 2022 and his plans have not been implemented.
