= Cannabis in Panama =

Cannabis in Panama has a documented history that includes early local use, government prohibition, and later involvement in international drug trafficking.

It was banned by the Panama Canal Zone government in 1923. Official studies in the 1920s found limited harm from its use, but prohibition remained. In the decades that followed, Panama became a transit point for marijuana shipments, with authorities reporting large seizures and criminal cases tied to trafficking. The substance was known locally as Canyac or Kan Jac as of the 1930s.

Legislative debate over medical cannabis began in 2017, leading to the legalization of medicinal use in 2021, making Panama the first country in Central America to enact such a law.

== History ==
The Panamanian 1935 Judicial Register refers to cannabis being commonly known locally as "Canyac" or "Kan Jac".

=== Prohibition ===
The cultivation and use of cannabis (kan-jac) was banned in Panama in 1923.

In November 1926, a Panamanian judge sentenced an American seaman to a year in prison for possessing and smoking cannabis indica cigarettes in the Panama Canal Zone. This led to the formation of an official committee to study marijuana’s effects. After reviewing literature and conducting supervised experiments with 17 subjects, the committee found that marijuana use produced only minor effects for most people, was not habit-forming, and did not result in violence or insanity. The committee recommended against special legislation or prohibition in the Canal Zone, though U.S. states at the time classified marijuana as a dangerous drug.

Through the 1970s, Panama became recognized as a transshipment point for marijuana en route to the United States. In 1973, U.S. officials through the New York Times acknowledged improved Panamanian anti-narcotics measures, including major seizures of marijuana, and noted that the plant grew abundantly in Panama. Authorities imposed penalties for selling marijuana of up to five years in prison, with lighter sentences for possession.

On October 15, 1976, the Panamanian-flagged freighter Don Emilio was seized by the U.S. Coast Guard at the request of Panamanian authorities. The vessel was found to be carrying approximately 82 tons of marijuana, making it one of the largest marijuana seizures by U.S. law enforcement at the time. The ship's Panamanian registration was described by officials as a flag of convenience, and all crew members were Colombian nationals.

In the 1980s, Panama under General Manuel Noriega became a major route for drug trafficking, including large shipments of marijuana. U.S. grand juries indicted Noriega in 1988 for conspiring with drug dealers to move over a million pounds of marijuana, along with cocaine, through Panama to the United States. Testimony and evidence in U.S. courts connected Noriega and close associates to large-scale marijuana smuggling and money laundering schemes between 1983 and 1988. These operations involved laundering tens of millions of dollars through Panamanian banks and relabeling containers of marijuana as Panamanian goods for shipment to the U.S.

Panamanian authorities have periodically destroyed illegal cannabis crops. In September 2015, Panamanian soldiers uprooted and burned thousands of marijuana plants on a remote island in the Perlas Archipelago. In June 2017, Panamanian police reported seizing one ton of marijuana during a two-year investigation into a multinational drug trafficking ring.

Marijuana was the second most consumed illicit substance in Panama by 2019.

=== Legalization of Medical Cannabis ===
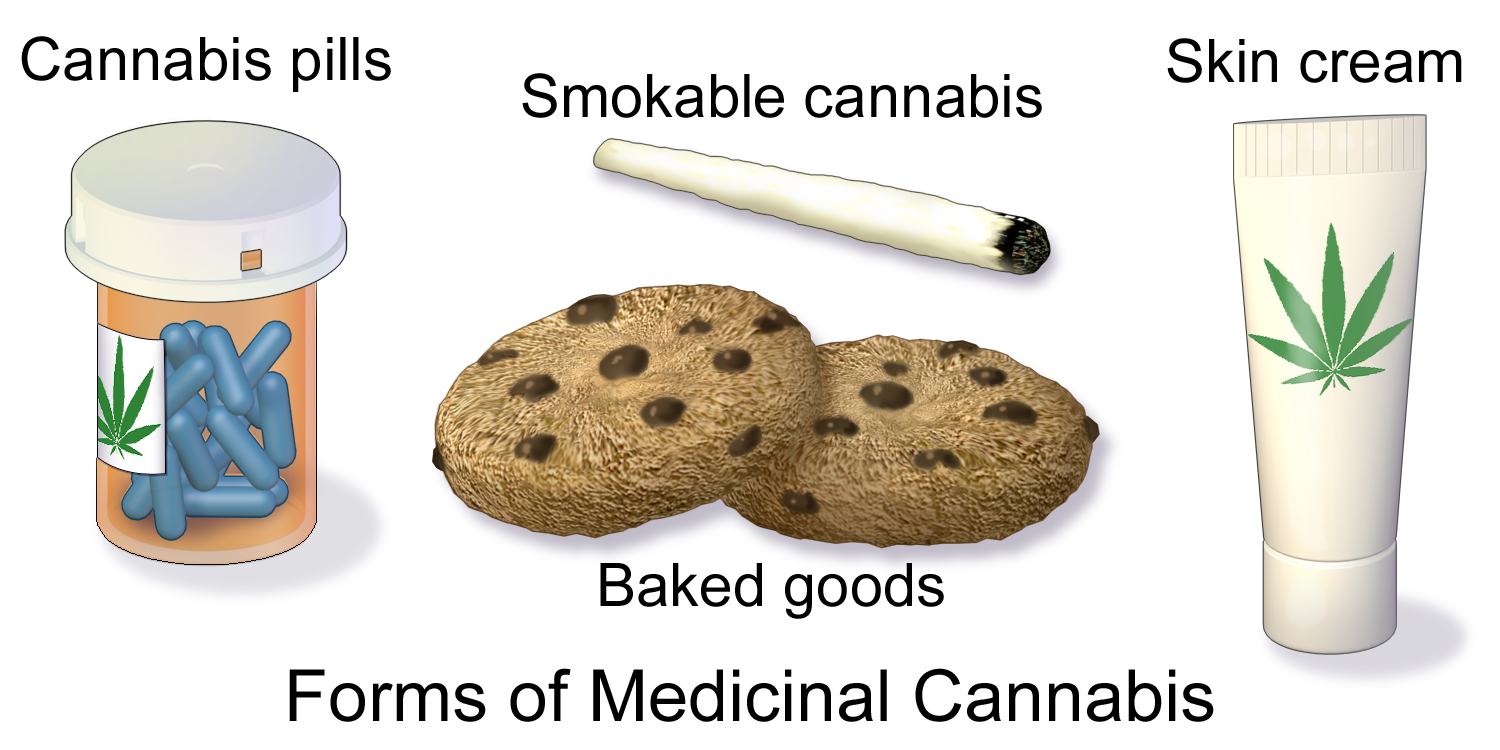
Types of Medicinal Cannabis

The debate over legalizing medicinal marijuana began in Panama around 2017. Although the legislature gave initial approval to a legalization proposal, it opted for further study. On October 9, 2019, the congressional Commission on Work, Health, and Social Development resumed debate on the proposal. For legalization to proceed, the bill would need to pass additional reviews and be signed by the president.

Medical cannabis was legalized in 2021, after Law 242 passed the national assembly by a unanimous vote and was signed into law by President Laurentino Cortizo in October. This law permitted medicinal and therapeutic use of cannabis for conditions such as epilepsy and chronic pain, addressing previous patient demand. Panama became the first Central American country to legalize medical cannabis.

In September 2022, regulations were enacted to implement the law, establishing a government body to oversee cultivation, production, and distribution, and limiting initial manufacturing licenses. Commercialization of cannabis products will be tightly controlled, including import monitoring and traceability from cultivation to final sale points.

Panama opened its first pharmacy exclusively dedicated to medicinal cannabis on January 22, 2026. The director of Pharmacies and Drugs at Minsa confirmed that seven licenses for the commercialization of cannabis-derived products have been issued. One licensee has opened the specialized pharmacy, while others may distribute products through pre-existing authorized pharmacy chains.

All medicinal cannabis products are imported, but a two-year transition period allows licensees to cultivate and manufacture these products domestically. The Panama Ministry of Agricultural Development will collaborate with Minsa to regulate seeds and cultivation. One of the main challenges in Panama remains overcoming the stigma associated with medicinal cannabis.

Minsa established a dedicated section on its website for medicinal cannabis where patients can search for authorized products, their lots, and availability at pharmacies. CBD products are available with a standard prescription for chronic pain management, while THC products need a special prescription and are reserved for complex conditions like refractory epilepsy and multiple sclerosis.

Cannabis in Panama is illegal for recreational use, but the law is often unenforced, and its use is often tolerated by the general public. It is often consumed by the youth and cannabis extracts are sometimes used in e-cigarettes.
