= Cannabis in Costa Rica =

The consumption of cannabis is nominally illegal in Costa Rica; however, personal consumption does not carry any criminal penalties. The sale of marijuana, however, can be punished criminally. As of March 2022 medicinal cannabis has been approved.

== Interpretation ==
Laws in Costa Rica are vague on the topic of the legality of marijuana. According to The Costa Rica News, "The Narcotics Law No. 8204 says that it's illegal to sell and produce marijuana on a big scale. It's also illegal to carry marijuana of more than a small dose. That said, the law doesn’t specify how much marijuana qualifies as a 'small dose' or if it's legal to grow the plant for personal use." Many have interpreted this vagueness in the law to mean personal consumption in small dosages are legal in private areas. Police Enforcement in Costa Rica (Fuerza Pública) does not have a specific protocol to deal with cannabis users, nonetheless in case of possession of "small dosages" (informally considered somewhat between 1 - 8 grams) they will confiscate the drugs. In the case of a larger amount they may proceed with a formal arrest.

In March 2019, a pilot project was proposed to legalize and regulate medical cannabis and essential cannabis oils in Costa Rica, said project was set to be reviewed by the congress of the republic (Legislative Assembly of Costa Rica).

In March 2022, Costa Rica President Carlos Alvarado signed the bill that legalizes marijuana for therapeutic and medicinal use. Recreational use of cannabis continues to be prohibited.
