= Cannabis in San Marino =

Cannabis in San Marino is illegal for recreational purposes, but some cannabis-based remedies are legal for medical purposes.

== History ==
A 1973 United States government report noted the legal status of cannabis in San Marino: The 1956 law of San Marino does not specifically include cannabis in its list of Narcotic Drugs, which is based on the 1931 convention, however, the law also refers to other decrees which probably include cannabis as a narcotic substance. The penalty for illicit possession, use, importing, exporting or trafficking narcotic substances is three to eight years in prison and a fine.

== Medical cannabis ==
In 2016, an istanza d’Arengo (public initiative) was presented to the government of San Marino, requesting the legalization of medical cannabis. The measure was approved by the government, which began the process of establishing a cultivation plan, negotiating international treaties, and other needed steps.

As of 2016, Sativex is issued at no cost in San Marino to patients suffering from pain due to multiple sclerosis or bone-marrow conditions.
