= Cannabis in Zimbabwe =

Cannabis in Zimbabwe is a traditional crop, generally called mbanje, that is considered illegal except for licensed medical use.

== History ==
Arrived centuries ago, Cannabis has a long history in Zimbabwe, with the first archaeological evidence estimated around 1200 CE and numerous evidence of use during the times of the Kingdom of Zimbabwe and later Kingdom of Mutapa.

== Culture ==
The plant is generally called mbanje, although other names are used such as suruma (near the Mozambique border).

In the northwest Binga region, in particular, cannabis consumption "holds cultural significance as a social activity and where there are [traditional] medicinal uses for cannabis."

== Legislation ==
Cannabis is illegal in Zimbabwe except for licensed medical use, and possession may be punished with up to 12 years in jail.

=== Reform ===
On Friday 27 April 2018 Zimbabwe became the second African country to legalize marijuana for medical and scientific purposes. A press release published in Business Report on 30 April 2017 described how Zimbabweans were now allowed to “apply for licenses in growing cannabis specifically for medical and research.”

The country's health minister, David Parirenyatwa released the new policies for licensing of individuals and enterprises to cultivate Mbanje. The duration of licenses is a maximum of five years and renewable allowing growers to own, sell, and transport cannabis in dried and oil forms. Applicants are required to state plans for the growing site along with quantity for production and selling as well as production period. The health minister has the prerogative not to approve a license if it causes risks in terms of public health and security.

The Zimbabwe Mail reported that ministers of parliament lobbied for the reduction of the “$50,000 license fee imposed on growers if they want to produce cannabis commercially.” According to these legislators, the fees are exorbitant and "will lock out poor farmers in farms like [those in the] Binga District who have been growing marijuana illegally".

In 2017, Macro-Economic Planning and Investment Promotion Minister Dr Obert Mpofu noted that a Canadian firm had applied to cultivate medical cannabis in Zimbabwe, stating the government was "seriously considering" the application.

Reportedly, farmers were offered 100% ownership of their land for the cultivation of medicinal marijuana in May 2020.

The new legislation has been criticised for not being

primarily aimed at providing alternative livelihoods for illicit producers, but rather at attracting foreign and local investment and promoting the legal industry as a key economic sector. Many people, including illicit cultivators, are unable to participate in the legal market due to barriers such as high license fees. […] License holders struggle to produce due to high production costs, regulatory and market hurdles, and the political and economic complexities.

Observers have regretted "the risk of corporate capture" and undermining of "agribusiness’ production" associated with the reform.
