= Cannabis in Luxembourg =

Cannabis in Luxembourg is legal for recreational and medical use for adults under specific circumstances. A bill was passed in the country's parliament June 2023 to legalise the following for adults in Luxembourg: recreational possession, home-use of cannabis, and growing up to four cannabis plants per household. The law took effect on 21 July 2023.

Possession, consumption, transportation, and purchase of cannabis in public spaces remains prohibited. Prosecution depends on the amount of cannabis one possesses. Since 2001, prison penalty has been substituted by a monetary fine ranging from 25 to 500 euros.

== Decriminalization ==
In April 2001, Luxembourg updated its prior 1973 law, and reclassified cannabis as a Category B controlled substance, meriting only a fine for a first offense, effectively decriminalizing personal possession.

== Medical cannabis ==
In November 2017, the Minister of Health announced a two-year pilot program under which Luxembourgers would be able to obtain cannabis extracts and cannabinoids for medical purposes.

In June 2018, lawmakers unanimously approved a bill to legalise the medical use of cannabis.

== Legalisation ==
In November 2018, the government announced that it would legalise the recreational use of cannabis, and an exact timetable had yet to be defined. In October 2021, the government announced plans to legalise growing up to four cannabis plants per household for personal use, however, the legalisation project had been delayed by the COVID pandemic as early as mid-2020. In April 2023, the government announced plans to issue two production licences to grow cannabis domestically and control the entire supply chain over 14 dispensaries across the country, however, given the complexity, the draft law would not be finalised before the October elections. In June 2023, the Chamber of Deputies approved a bill that legalises growing up to four cannabis plants per domestic community and consuming cannabis at home for adults, while keeping small fines for public smoking and possession, transportation and purchase of up to three grams (1/10 oz). The law took effect on 21 July 2023. There are plans to create a regulated market to produce and sell cannabis that would be state controlled.

== Politics ==
The Democratic Party (DP), the Luxembourgish Socialist Workers' Party (LSAP), the Green Party (Déi Gréng), the Pirate Party and the Left Party are in favor of legalizing cannabis for recreational use. Member of Parliament Carole Hartmann from the DP party has stated that if alcohol and cigarettes are legal, so should cannabis, however, awareness campaigns should be part of the legalisation. The Christian Social People's Party (CSV) is very skeptical of the project, while The Alternative Democratic Reform Party (ADR) is undecided. Claude Wiseler, member of the Parliament, and President of the CSV party, has compared the project with the Canadian example, where the black market would not disappear right away and the quality of the products would decrease to compete in price with the legal alternatives. Minister of Health Paulette Lenert argued that in Canada the legal market has overtaken the black market as of 2020 and according to research in the US, consumption amongst minors has not increased, as it's feared by the CSV party. Moreover, the project aims at monitoring the THC levels which have spiked on the black market, and have caused numerous health issues.

In July 2022 at a conference on the topic of cannabis laws within the European Union, uniting Germany, Malta, the Netherlands, and Luxembourg, Paulette Lenert and the Minister of Justice, Sam Tanson both expressed the need to change to a regulatory approach on cannabis, based on dialogue with member states that have reached the same conclusion, that is, the failure of repressive politics throughout half a century in preventing the sale of illicit substances and in the fight against addiction.
