= Cannabis in Vanuatu =

- Location of Vanuatu (red)
- Medicinal: Legal
- Recreational: Illegal
- Hemp: Legal

Cannabis in Vanuatu is illegal for recreational purposes but is legal for medical and industrial purposes.

== Enforcement ==
A 2017 news report noted recent increases in cannabis arrests as police attempted to clarify and enforce cannabis law on remote islands where "locals did not adapt." A 2018 report recounted an incident on the Epi Island to Port Vila ferry where some 60 young people from Malekula were being transported under police escort for cannabis cultivation, distribution, and consumption.

== Medical reform ==
A September 2018 news report noted that Vanuatu's national health care system was considering clinical trials of a cannabis-based drug to treat diabetes. On September 20, 2018, the government's Council of Ministers issued Decision 157/2018 allowing for the establishment of industries for the production of medical cannabis and industrial hemp.
