= Cannabis in the Netherlands =

Legality of cannabis in Europe Legal for recreational use Legal for medical use Illegal

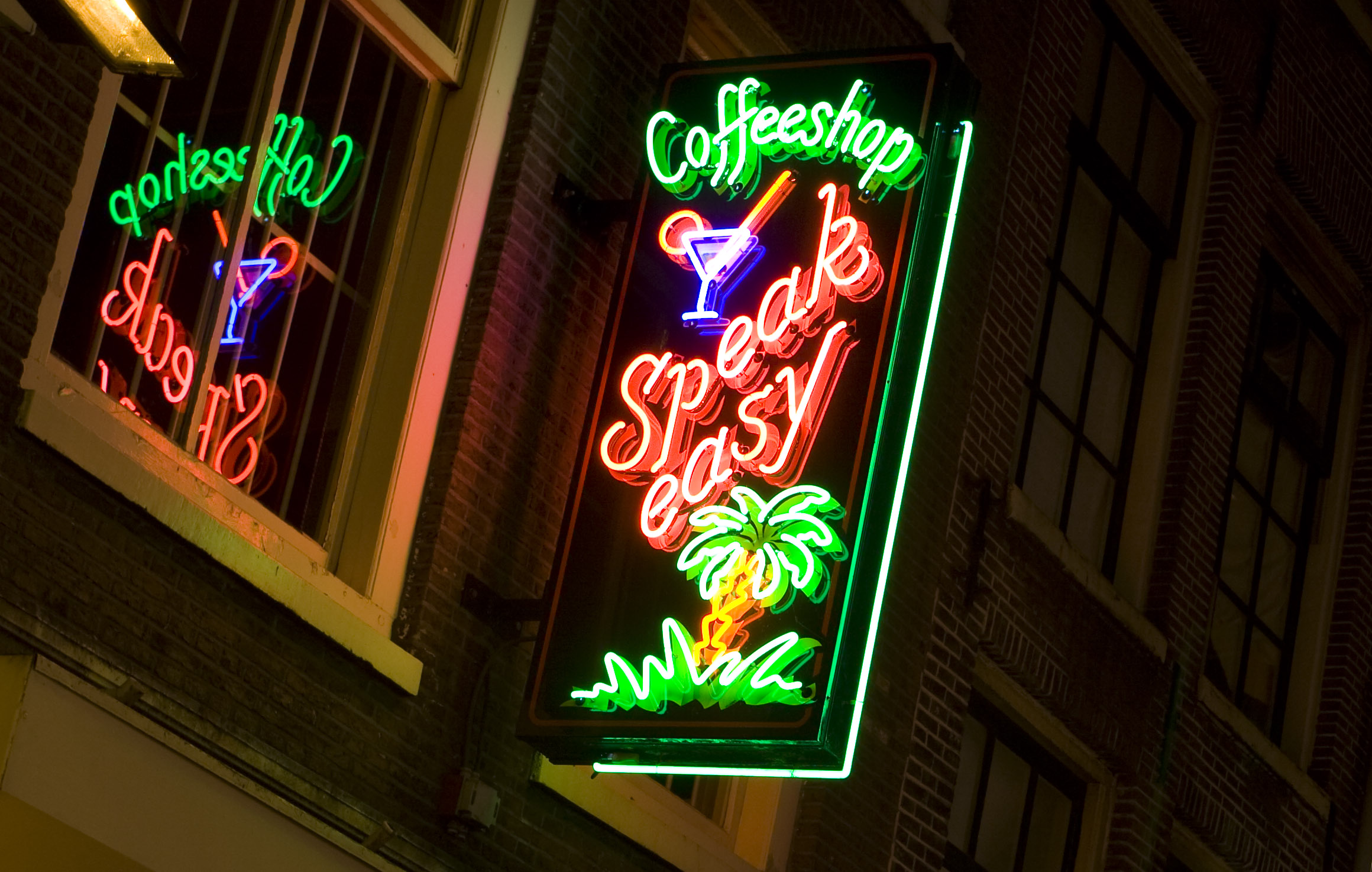
Cannabis coffee shop in Amsterdam, Netherlands

Cannabis in the Netherlands is illegal, but is decriminalised for personal use for those aged 18 and over. Recreational consumption of the drug is tolerated, and it is available in coffeeshops for those meeting the same age requirement.

== Prohibition ==
Cannabis was first criminalised in the Netherlands in 1953, following earlier laws against its import and export in 1928. Cannabis was banned much earlier in the Dutch colony of Suriname, in the early part of the 20th century, and in Dutch Indonesia in 1927.

== Loosening ==
In 1972, the Dutch government divided drugs into more- and less-dangerous categories, with cannabis being in the lesser category. Accordingly, possession of 30 grams (1 oz) or less was made a misdemeanor.

== Coffeeshops ==
Cannabis has been available for recreational use in coffee shops since 1976. Cannabis products are only sold openly in certain local "coffeeshops" and possession of up to 5 grams (one-sixth ounce) for personal use is decriminalised. However, the police may still confiscate it. A person must be aged 18 or over to be admitted into a coffeeshop and to purchase cannabis.

Since 1 January 2013, only residents of the Netherlands are allowed to enter coffeeshops and purchase cannabis there; however, according to the Government of the Netherlands, "whether this rule is actively enforced differs from municipality to municipality".

Other types of sales and transportation are not permitted, although the general approach toward cannabis was lenient even before official decriminalisation.

Though retail sales are tolerated, production, transportation, and bulk possession of marijuana outside of retail stores is illegal, preventing testing for contaminants and dosing. After legalization and regulation of the entire supply chain in other countries, some cities in the Netherlands are participating in a pilot project using officially approved growers and testers, and labeling of the amount of THC.

== Medical marijuana ==
Since 2003, there has been a legal prescription drug known as "Mediwiet", available at Dutch pharmacies. There are five different types of medical cannabis in the Netherlands; the fifth contains Cannabidiol and almost no Tetrahydrocannabinol.

== See also ==
- Drug policy of the Netherlands
