= Cannabis in Jamaica =

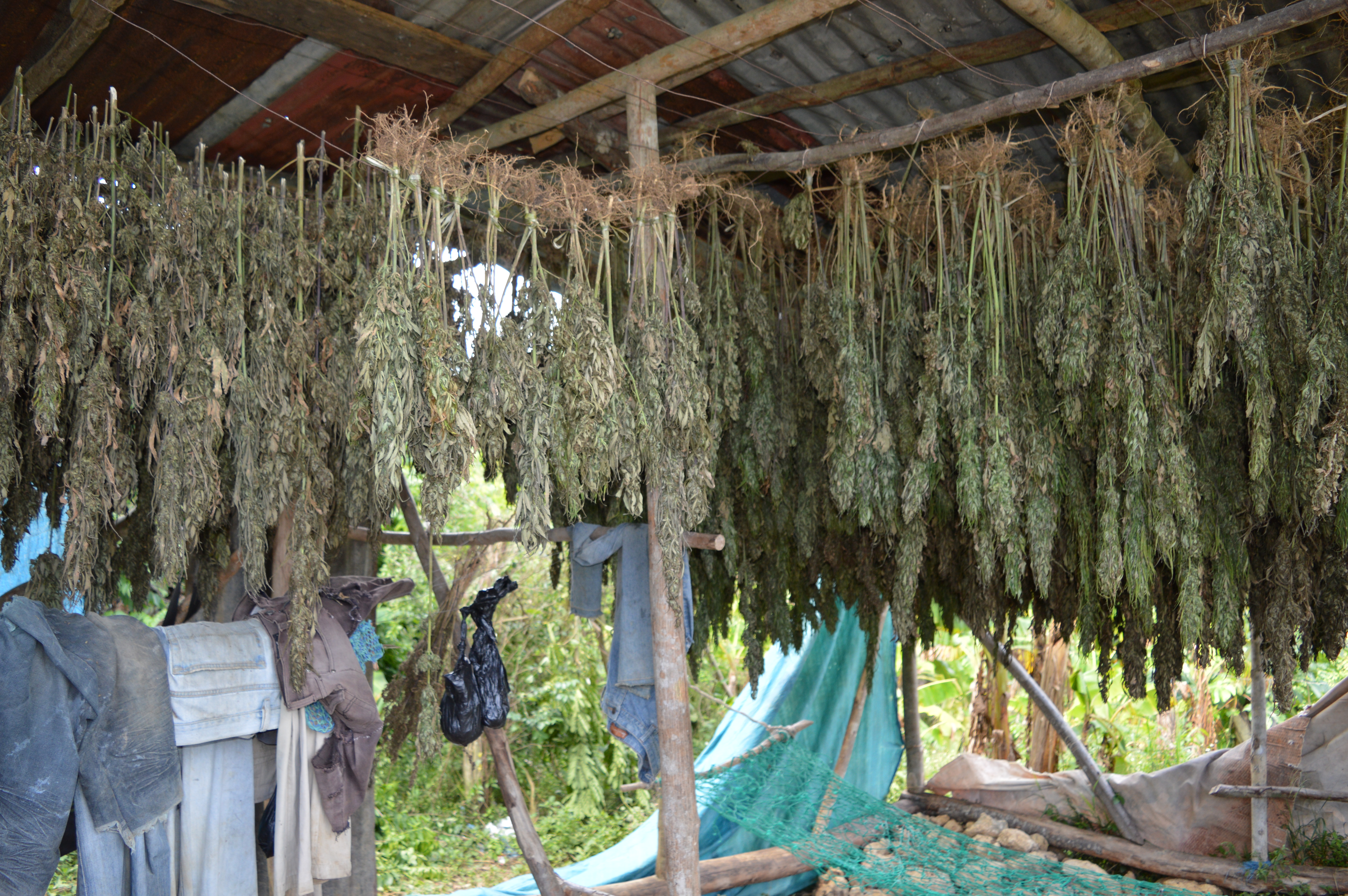
A ganja farm in Westmoreland Parish, Jamaica

Cannabis in Jamaica is illegal, but possession of small amounts was reduced to a petty offence in 2015. Cannabis is locally known as ganja, and internationally cannabis consumption plays a prominent role in the nation's public image, being tied to cultural touchstones such as Rastafari and reggae music. Ganja tourists have been welcomed in the 21st century.

== History ==
Cannabis was introduced to Jamaica in the 1850s–1860s by import from licensed businesses often run by Indian Jewish families in the Bengal region of India (also now Bangladesh/West Bengal) for consumption by indentured servants from India during British rule of both nations; many of the terms used in cannabis culture in Jamaica are based on Indian terms, including the term ganja.

=== Prohibition ===
Cannabis – then called "Indian Hemp" – was banned in Jamaica under the 1913 Ganja Law, supported by the Council of Evangelical Churches in Jamaica. The laws were gradually tightened over time, with academics noting that the harsh 1941 and 1961 restrictions occurred during periods where the authorities feared unrest in the lower classes.

=== Commerce ===
While cannabis use had been customary in Jamaica for over a century, in the 1960s cannabis farmers began to take advantage of the growing demand in Europe and North America, leading to increased police enforcement, but also corruption of the security and political systems by the profits from international trafficking.

== Decriminalization ==
In February 2015, Jamaica's legislature voted to amend the nation's cannabis laws:

- Possession of up to two ounces (57 g) is a petty offence, and will not result in a criminal record
- Cultivation of five or fewer plants is permitted
- Practitioners of the Rastafari faith may use cannabis for religious purposes
- Tourists with a prescription for medical marijuana may apply for permits to purchase small amounts
- The amendments open the possibility of a licensing authority to deal with cultivation and distribution of medical marijuana
- Jamaica will continue to prosecute traffickers and target the international cannabis trade

== Cannabis industry ==
In April 2015, Jamaica planted its first legal cannabis plant, at the University of the West Indies Mona campus.

In March 2018, Balram Vaswani, a long-time advocate for the legalisation of marijuana, opened the first legal medical marijuana dispensary, Kaya Herbhouse, in Drax Hall, St. Ann.

Heavy rains during the 2020 hurricane season, followed by a severe drought, an increase in consumption, and a decline in the number of retailers resulted in a marijuana shortage as of early 2021.

As of 2021, the Jamaica Cannabis Licensing Authority authorized 29 cultivators and 73 transporters, processors, retailers and others. Marijuana was sold by legal retailers (called "herb houses") at about five to ten times the cost of cannabis sold illicitly on the street.

== See also ==
- Cannabis culture
- Rastafari
