= Cannabis in Greenland =

- Location of Greenland (dark green)
- Medicinal: Legal
- Recreational: Illegal

Cannabis in Greenland is illegal recreationally, but is used in the country. Scholarly works in 2010 and 2015 noted increasing cannabis use in the nation.

== Legality ==
Greenland is an autonomous constituent country of the Kingdom of Denmark. In Denmark, recreational use of cannabis is illegal, but medical use is permitted. Greenland mirrors this policy – recreational cannabis is illegal on the island, though medical usage is allowed with a doctor's prescription.

== Constituent usage ==
A study in 2002 showed that 44.1 percent of male and 47 percent of female fifteen-year-olds living in Greenland had used cannabis. In 2019, the national public health survey found that 21.3% of Adults smoke cannabis monthly or more often.

== Economy ==
Cannabis in Greenland can cost $59 per gram.
