= Cannabis in the Czech Republic =

Legality of cannabis in Europe Legal for recreational use Legal for medical use Illegal^{1}May include recent laws or court decisions which have not yet entered into effect.

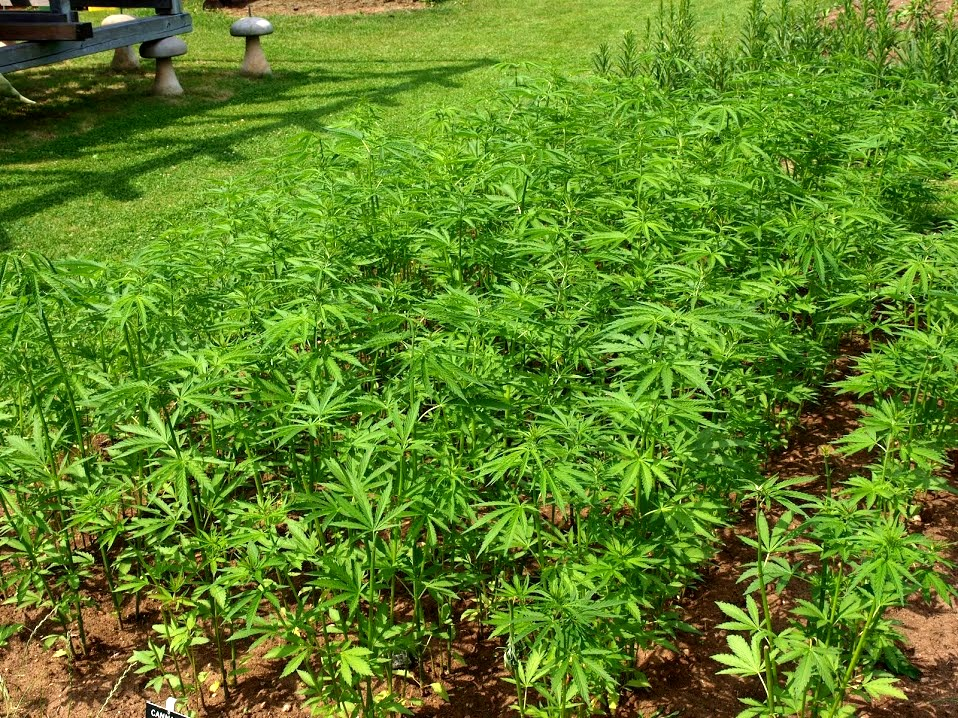
Cannabis plants

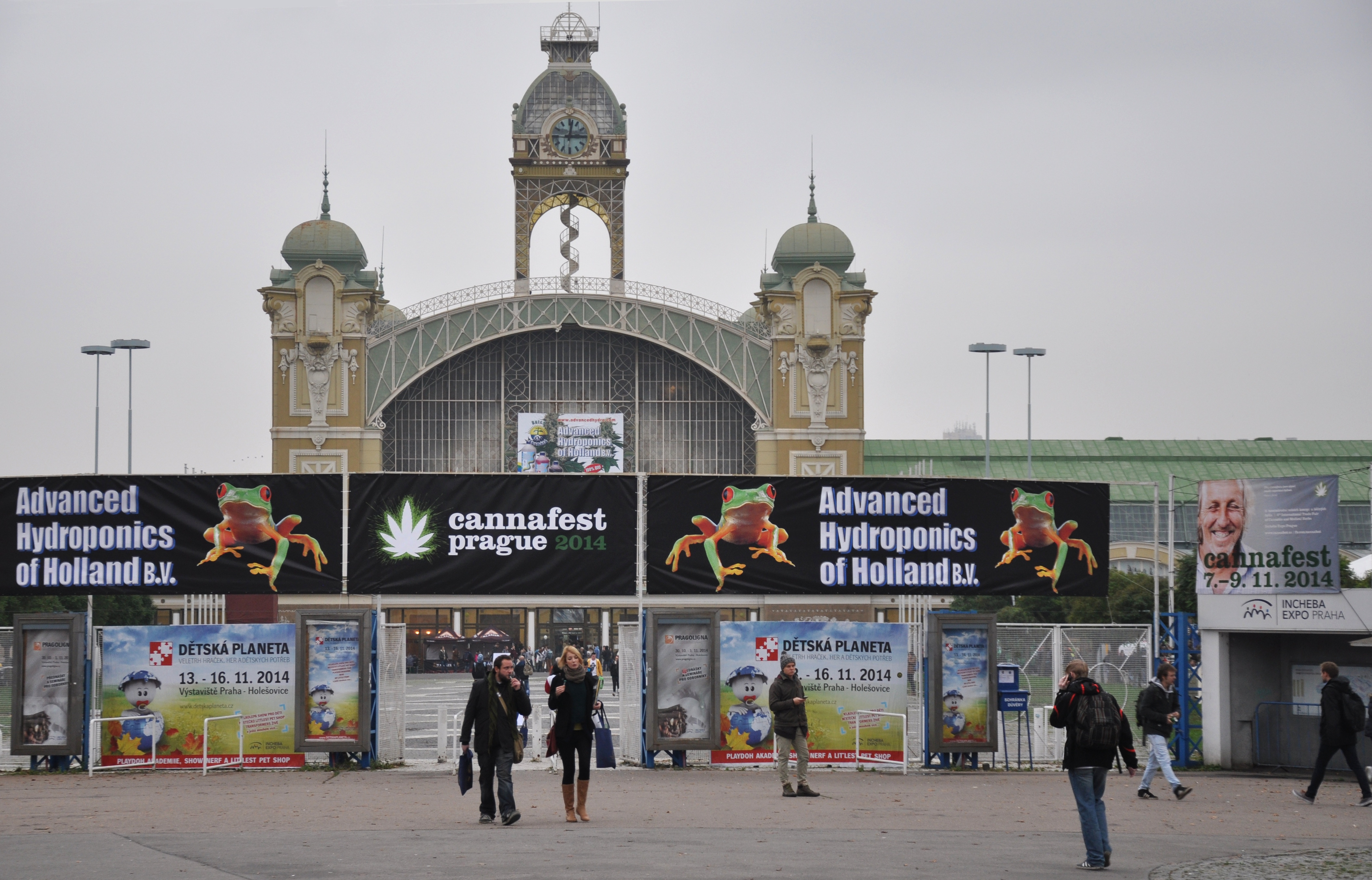
Cannafest Prague 2014

Indoor hemp cultivation for cannabidiol (CBD) production in Orlová (2021)

In the Czech Republic, cannabis is legal for recreational use. Personal possession has been decriminalized since 1 January 2010, and medical cannabis has been legal since 1 April 2013.

Since 1 January 2026, adults aged 21 and over may legally cultivate up to three cannabis plants and possess up to 100 g of dried cannabis at home (and up to 25 g in public). Commercial sales remain prohibited.

== Decriminalization ==
Possession of more than 15 grams (½ oz) of dry cannabis for personal use, or cultivation of more than five plants, is classed as a civil offence. However since 1 January 2010, possession of less than 15g (½ oz) and less than 5 plants is an infraction. On conviction, a fine of up to 15,000CZK can be imposed, but fines are typically much lower. Cannabis is easy to obtain at concerts. Bars are not a reliable place to obtain cannabis, with bartenders facing high scrutiny from local police. However, cannabis remains illegal, and possession of larger amounts can lead to a jail sentence of one year. Trafficking is a criminal offence, with the minimum penalty set at two years imprisonment and maximum penalty set at 18 years imprisonment, though sentences of 10–18 years are only imposed in extreme cases. A suspended sentence or other alternative punishment is usually imposed in the case of minor trafficking that does not generate a significant income.

== Medical cannabis ==
A bill allowing cannabis to be legally available on prescription in pharmacies as a medicine was passed by the Czech Chamber of Deputies on 7 December 2012, with 126 votes for legalisation and 7 against (27 abstained and 46 were absent from the vote). The Czech Senate passed the bill on 30 January 2013. From the total of 81 senators 67 voted for legalisation and 2 voted against (5 senators abstained and 7 were absent from the vote). The bill also stipulated that only imported cannabis would be allowed for sale in the first year "to ensure standards." After that, sales may expand to include registered, domestic production that is strictly monitored.

The law came into effect on 1 April 2013 and since then medical use of cannabis has been legal and regulated in the Czech Republic. The law allows for 180 g (6 oz) of dry matter per month, as prescribed by specialized physicians, and can be obtained using an electronic prescription form.

== Effects of possible legalization ==
A cost–benefit analysis of legalizing cannabis markets in the Czech Republic was carried out by the Journal of Benefit-Cost Analysis and published by Cambridge University Press in March 2025. The analysis stated that, "In countries with repressive drug policies, the costs of its prohibition plausibly outweigh the benefits" and that "Under all the projected scenarios, the identified benefits of legalizing cannabis for personal use exceed the potential costs". The report concluded that legalization would be a "net social benefit" and generate between "34.4 to 107.6 million EUR per year (or between 3.2 and 10.1 EUR per capita)" in the Czech Republic.

== See also ==
- Drug policy of the Czech Republic
