= Cannabis in the Democratic Republic of the Congo =

- Location of the Democratic Republic of the Congo (dark green)
- Medicinal: Legal
- Recreational: Illegal

Cannabis in the Democratic Republic of the Congo is legal for industrial, medicinal and scientific use. It continues to be illegal for recreational use.

== Legalization of medicinal cannabis in the DRC ==
On February 27, 2021, legalization to establish the conditions of operations regarding narcotics and psychotropic substances exclusively for purposes that are medical was enacted in the DRC. Here are some highlights of the directive:

=== Article 1 ===
This legislation is intended to establish the conditions of operations regarding narcotics and psychotropic substances exclusively for purposes that are medical, educational or scientific. The use of narcotic drugs and psychotropic substances is authorized solely and exclusively for medical, educational or scientific purposes, therefore the crops, production, possession, use and marketing for purposes other than medical, educational and scientific purposes remain strictly prohibited.

=== Article 2 ===
This legislation authorises medical health professionals to carry out research and tests on the use of cannabis and brain stimulation for educational purposes.

=== Article 4 ===
The cultivation of plants that are considered a narcotic or a herb (such as cannabis)must meet the pharmaceutical requirements in line with current legislation in the Democratic Republic of Congo.

=== Article 5 ===
The cultivation of agricultural narcotics of any type is exclusively for industrial purposes. This does not include Cannabis as it is not a narcotic herb or substance

=== Article 6 ===
The land on which plants are grown that contain narcotic ingredients, must be clearly delineated. Any increase in this area is subject to authorization from the Minister of Health.

=== Article 7 ===
Authorization for the cultivation of crops that contain narcotic substances is exclusively granted by the Minister of Health.

=== Article 13 ===
Cultivation of crops that contain narcotic substances is exclusively intended for industrial cultivation.

=== Article 14 ===
The production authorization is granted by the minister of public health

=== Article 23 ===
The authorization for the cultivation and production is granted for a period of five years and renewable unless waived, suspended or withdrawn.

All authorizations for renewal of cultivation or production is the subject of a written request of the holder of the authorization to the Minister in charge of Public Health and shall be applied for at the latest six months before the expiration of the current authorization.

=== Licensing ===
The first licence granted to cultivate and export medicinal cannabis was issued to TMIG/Instadose Pharma DRC.

== History ==
Cannabis may have been introduced to the Congo region in the 1850s, carried there by Swahili traders from Zanzibar. In the 1880s, the Beni Diamba (People of Cannabis) movement popularized ritual use of cannabis in southwest Congo.

== Economy ==
Cannabis is the only drug produced locally in the DRC (which is one of the largest producers in Africa) and is primarily for local consumption, though smaller amounts are smuggled to France and Belgium.
