= Cannabis in Saint Vincent and the Grenadines =

Cannabis in Saint Vincent and the Grenadines was prior known to be illegal but is now decriminalized up to 2 ounces. Cannabis is widely grown illicitly on the island and is the nation's most valuable agricultural product. Saint Vincent is the most prolific producer of cannabis in the Caribbean, other than Jamaica.

== Present status ==
Persons caught with 56 grammes (two ounces) or less of the drug will not be subject to incarceration. Instead, they will be fined a maximum of $500 and be subject to other measures including begin given educational material about cannabis; counselling and rehabilitative care. These provisions were among several amendments that were made to the Drugs (Prevention of Misuse) Amendment Act (2018), which was passed in Parliament on July 25. In addition to only being a ticketable offense, the amendment provides for Vincentians to smoke the herb in the privacy of their homes and in places of worship of the Rastafarian faith without punishment. The amendment also said that the Minister may designate a list of public areas where the smoking of cannabis may be allowed.

The country has correlating legal medical marijuana laws. Parliament on December 11, 2018, passed two Acts, one which establishes a Medical Cannabis Industry in St Vincent and the Grenadines and the other which offers amnesty for traditional marijuana growers. The Vincentian Parliament passed legislation to protect the intellectual property of breeders of new plant varieties in St. Vincent and the Grenadines (SVG), the Plant Breeders’ Protection Bill, 2019. It sets up the jurisprudential framework within which these persons will be able to accrue the rights, how these rights will be protected, how they will be published so that persons in the entire society, in the court and globally, can be aware of the hard work which was done, the agriculture minister said. Under the law, a person must obtain the authorization of a grantee with respect to propagating material of the protected variety, to produce or reproduce, condition the material for the purpose of propagation, offer the material for sale, to sell the material, import or export the material, or stock the material for any of the previous purposes.

Regarding infringement of plant breeders’ rights, the following acts are exempt: an act done privately for non-commercial purposes, an act done for experimental purposes, or an act done for the purpose of breeding other plant varieties. The law allows for compulsory licenses where a person may apply to the court for the grant of a compulsory license to exploit a protected variety in SVG. Subject to terms that the court thinks fit, the court may make an order for the grant of compulsory licenses if it is satisfied that the grant of the compulsory licenses is in the public interest. Offense under the law include falsification of register and falsely representing a plant variety as a protected variety. The law also orders the registrar to publish applications for plant breeders’ rights, proposed and approved denominations, withdrawals of application for plant breeders’ rights, the rejection of applications for plant breeders’ rights, any grant of a breeders’ right, any change in the breeder or the agent in respect of a plant variety, lapses of plant breeders’ rights, any invalidation or revocation of a plant breeder's rights, the licenses in relation to plant breeders’ rights, where applicable.

== History ==
Commercial cultivation of cannabis in SVG began in the 1970s; the island's inaccessible hilly volcanic interior, rich soil, and wide array of often empty islands proved to make it an excellent place to cultivate and traffic cannabis. Prior to the 1970s, most cannabis in SVG was the product of Colombia or Trinidad. A large portion of the cultivators were youth who had previously worked on banana farms, until price downturns led to a collapse of the banana industry.

In the 1980s, the United States greatly increased cannabis interdiction in the Caribbean, which led to the unintended consequence of stimulating domestic cannabis cultivation in the United States. By the 1990s, SVG's advantage in the regional cannabis market had faded, but with supply still steady, they began increased exports to neighboring island nations. Cannabis had become the island's major cash-crop, and cannabis cultivators grouped themselves into alliances mirrored after the familiar Banana Growers' Association. By the year 2000, the cannabis crop was estimated (even after 10% eradication) at US$40 million, outpacing even bananas.

== Economy ==
In 2010, SVG's cannabis production was assessed:

- 50% Caribbean market
- 15% United States
- 23% UK and Europe
- 10% Canada
- 2% local consumption
