= Personality Assessment System =

Personality model formulated by John W. Gittinger

The Personality Assessment System (PAS) is a descriptive model of personality formulated by John W. Gittinger. The system has been used by scientists in studying personality and by clinicians in clinical practice. A major feature of the PAS is that a personality profile can be systematically interpreted from a set of Wechsler Scales subtest scores.

The PAS has two aspects which distinguish it from other personality models. They are the use of the Wechsler subtests, an objective test, to determine a personality and the use of a developmental model in which the description of personality includes development through adolescence.

Krauskopf has proposed that differential aptitudes are the "cause" of personality differences. The reason is that people prefer to use aptitudes they feel they are better at than ones where they feel weaker. Krauskopf calls this hypothesis "radical" because so little attention has been paid to the idea. With this "radical hypothesis", the use of an intelligence test, the Wechsler Adult Intelligence Scale to obtain personality information makes sense.

== Description ==
This very brief description is based primarily on the most recently published description of the PAS although there is no disagreement with other descriptions.

The PAS is based on premises (among others) that behavior is determined by both heredity and environment and behavior is determined by an interacting system of traits. Furthermore, these traits can be modified through learning to such an extent that some might be nearly opposite to the original genetic direction. Gittinger's original formulation defines three primitive dimensions to which must be added general ability level which is referred to in the PAS as Normal Level. There is an additional dimension related to psychological energy. In the theory, gender and age also affect the final personality description.

The first dimension is Internalizer-Externalizer which is an ability to manipulate internal stimuli or symbols without being distracted by the external world. This is similar, but not identical, to the familiar introversion-extroversion dimension. The internalizer relies more on his own experience and internal landscape and is likely to be less active than externalizers. The externalizer is dependent on input from the outside and is more dependent on relating for the sake of relating. Gittinger called this the intellectual dimension.

The Regulated-Flexible dimension can be viewed by thinking of a regulated person as one who can see details within a whole, but not the whole. The regulated person is more stimulus bound and less able to see the "big picture". The regulated person is more procedurally oriented and emotionally insulated. The flexible person is involved with relationships and has attention diverted from step by step procedures. In theory, the regulated person has a high sensory threshold which is therefore satisfied less often than a flexible person. Gittinger called this the procedural dimension.

The Role Adaptable-Role Uniform dimension refers to a person's skill in meeting demands that others make of him. It is thus a social dimension. The behavior related to this dimension is generally without awareness. The adaptable person easily plays a variety of roles, being charming and moving easily in many different situations always making good first impressions. The role uniform person is able to handle only a few social roles at best and is often said to be socially inept. The behavior is most apparent in new social situations, since the role uniform may comfortable and accepted in a very familiar situation. The role adaptive can suffer from making good first impressions and then not understanding the unrealistic expectations others place upon him. Gittinger called this the social dimension.

A compensation (or lack thereof) is learned behavior a person adopts in childhood to go against their natural dimensions. This is done to gain better coping skills which their natural dimensions do not initially provide. Once developed, compensation tends to be strongly ingrained and resistant to external pressure. Finally, modification (or lack thereof), much like compensation, is a learned behavior to counter the individual's initial dimensions but it is developed in adulthood and is much more fragile and resistant to pressure. This behavior is learned to cope with adult responsibilities.

As the environment places demands upon a person to learn to compensate for weaknesses, the person may compensate to such an extent as to actually appear to have the opposite primitive trait. For example, a primitive externalizer may compensate and appear more as an internalizer. However, there are differences between an uncompensated primitive externalizer and a compensated internalizer. The compensated adjustment is a more tense adjustment and requires more rehearsal and more display of consistency. Also, a person who is compensated often reacts negatively to seeing their primitive trait displayed in others. A person may compensate in none, one, two or all three dimensions. The PAS calls the adjustment including compensation the basic level.

The PAS defines an additional level of adjustment called the contact or surface level. At the surface level, there are four possible adjustments. A person who is not compensated may either become modified, that is, attempt to display the opposite of their primitive trait on the surface or they may remain completely uncompensated and unmodified, retaining their primitive trait. A person who is compensated at the basic level may revert towards their primitive trait on the surface (this is called a controlled adjustment) or continue to move towards the opposite (this is called a repressed adjustment). A person makes adjustments in all three dimensions independently. For example, a person might have a modified adjustment in one dimension, a controlled adjustment in another, and a repressed adjustment in the third.

=== Subtest scales ===
Externalizer-Internalizer Dimension

Dimension	Compensation	Modification	Description
E	Low	Low	Primitive E
E	Low	High	Suppressed E
E	High	Low	Controlled E
E	High	High	Repressed E
I	Low	Low	Primitive I
I	Low	High	Suppressed I
I	High	Low	Controlled I
I	High	High	Repressed I

Regulated-Flexible Dimension

Dimension	Compensation	Modification	Description
F	Low	Low	Controlled F
F	Low	High	Repressed F
F	High	Low	Exploited F
F	High	High	Modified F
R	Low	Low	Modified R
R	Low	High	Exploited R
R	High	Low	Repressed R
R	High	High	Controlled R

Unacceptable-Acceptable Dimension

Dimension	Compensation	Modification	Description
U	Low	Low	Primitive U
U	Low	High	Suppressed U
U	High	Low	Controlled U
U	High	High	Repressed U
A	Low	Low	Controlled A
A	Low	High	Repressed A
A	High	Low	Suppressed A
A	High	High	Exploited A

A key feature of the PAS is that the profile of a particular person may be derived from their scores on the Wechsler Adult Intelligence Scale. The development of the PAS actually began when John Gittinger noticed certain behaviors which seemed to relate to subtest scores on the Wechsler. Over the years, as he observed many people, he developed the full theory and the method of translating Wechsler scores into PAS profiles. Many refinements in the method used to produce PAS profiles from Wechsler scores were made with the 2001 method and one much older method the most extensively used by psychologists using the PAS.

== Applications ==
The PAS has been used for many applications over the years. A sample of applications include education, career analysis, self-help, and intelligence gathering.

DuVivier discusses the importance of working with individual differences when analyzing college student success and drop-out rates with particular attention to avoiding drop-out. She uses an "Impressionistic Model Analysis" based on the PAS.

Downs studied college students majoring in mathematics and mathematics education. In the study, most students in both groups were primitive regulated, in fact, compensated regulated. Pure mathematics majors tended to be primitive and basic role uniform whereas mathematics education majors tended to be primitive role adaptive.

Meyers studied several police forces and discovered that police tended to be either primitive role adaptive or compensated role uniform people.

Wilton describes an entire toolbox of building life skills, everything from child training to dealing with obnoxious people to building security. She bases her work on her understanding of individual differences which she credits foremost to John Gittinger and the PAS.

DeForest describes the use of the PAS in two aspects of intelligence gathering in Vietnam. One use was to develop interrogation methods appropriate to the personality type of the subject. According to the DeForest's report of the work, Vietnamese were very similar to each other, especially at the primitive level, and this led to develop of a consistent method of interrogation. The PAS was also used to identify personalities that were likely to remain loyal, as opposed to ones who would flip-flop according to who they were dealing with at the moment. This was used to select subjects from among captives or deserters to return to enemy locations to gather intelligence.

== CIA connection ==
John Gittinger, the developer of the PAS, worked as a psychologist for the Central Intelligence Agency during the time he developed the PAS. Early publications describing the PAS appeared in academic publications and did not mention Gittinger's employer. While the PAS has been used in many contexts such as education and clinical work, it was developed by John Gittinger who worked with a number of other CIA employees. Gittinger and his PAS work were related to a wide range of projects, some of which were part of the set of projects known as Project MKUltra. Gittinger was a witness and identified as a CIA psychologist at Senate hearings into Project MKUltra. The relationship of Gittinger, the PAS and MKULTRA is discussed by Marks in chapter 11 of his book based upon examination of thousands of documents. Earlier articles on the PAS in professional and academic journals never mentioned John Gittinger's employer. While Marks' book is critical of the CIA and the MKULTRA project, Marks reports of Gittinger's passion for his personality system and describes it quite thoroughly. Marks also reports that Gittinger was very concerned that Marks' 1974 article connecting Gittinger, the PAS, and the CIA would damage Gittinger's professional career. Marks also reports that Gittinger was "humiliated" by the 1973 hearings saying Gittinger was interested in talking about his personality system, not the drug and sex scandals being pursued by the Senate committee. Note that Gittinger retired from government service in 1978.

The use of the PAS by a CIA psychologist in the field is described in DeForest's book. The book describes the work of a psychologist, Bill Todd (a pseudonym) in Vietnam. Treverton says that this book "is one for intelligence fans, not an assessment but a lively tale of a spymaster and his agents-" Manning's review in the New York Times says, "Orrin DeForest, the principal author of the book, certainly comes across as a disaffected C.I.A. person, and its contents are certainly self-serving. Whether the book is also misleading is difficult for someone outside the spook fraternity of hired dissemblers to ascertain. Nevertheless, Slow Burn has its virtues anyway."

== Literature ==
The PAS was developed primarily during the 1950s and 1960s with continued refinement since then. Due to the uniqueness of the developer, John W. Gittinger, and the nature of John Gittinger's career, the literature is somewhat unusual in two ways. First, while there are many journal articles published about the PAS and research using the PAS, only a small number are authored or co-authored by John Gittinger. Second, much research has been conducted which has not been published. Krauskopf and Suanders' book has the most thorough discussion of the theory of the PAS, how it relates to other theories in psychology, and of research concerning the PAS. This book has a very extensive bibliography of both research on the PAS itself and works using the PAS. Gittinger's major work, a 1964 work called the PAS Atlas contains the most complete description of the wide range of possible personality profiles. The PAS Atlas was never formally published by Gittinger. A revised version, which improved readability and usability, was published in 1992. Gittinger did publish two shorter descriptions of the PAS in academic journals with coauthor J. F. Winne in 1973.

An extensive summary of the relationship of the Wechsler and the PAS is available from Mattarazzo in chapter 14 (Personality and Related Correlates of the Wechsler Scales) of the standard reference on the Wechsler.

== PAS and MBTI ==
Krauskopf and Saunders discuss how the PAS relates to other differential concepts. Due to personal interactions at conferences, perhaps the relationship of the Myers-Briggs Type Indicator to the PAS has received more discussion and thought than other comparisons. The two systems have relationships but an individual's profile in one system is not readily derived from the profile of the other. Research and conference discussions suggest that conscious choices as defined by preferences made on the MBTI questionnaire define an individual's MBTI profile. Similarity, choices in one's life-style define a person's PAS third or surface dimension.

In the PAS terms, the face one shows to the world is the result of an individual's conscious and unconscious screening process. Like the MBTI profile, the PAS surface dimension reflects who a person is or how he/she wants to be seen.

The MBTI and PAS diverge on the source of what goes into one's public persona. The first two dimensions of the PAS represent measurable, developmental interactions of Nature and Nurture at play in forming one's "basic" or core personality. Based on motivations emanating from the basic personality, the surface persona is the result of an individual's largely, but not entirely, conscious choices to maximize strengths and to minimize weaknesses. Once the individual's basic or core personality is formed, it is immutable. In contrast, the surface dimension is subject to subtle transformations through life experiences such as education, therapy, illness, trauma, and/or aging.

So, while both the MBTI and the third dimension of PAS result from conscious choices about the identity a person wishes to project, these respective models vary as to the sources governing the decisions going into the choice of one's public persona.
