= Cannabis and time perception =

Effect of cannabis on time perception

The effect of cannabis on time perception has been studied with inconclusive results. Studies consistently show that most cannabis users self-report the experience of a slowed perception of time. In the laboratory, researchers have confirmed the effect of cannabis on the perception of time in both humans and animals. Studies have sought to explain how cannabis changes the internal clock. Matthew et al. (1998) looked at the cerebellum, positing a relationship between cerebellar blood flow and the distortion of time perception.

== Psychoactive effects ==
Reports of the effects of cannabis on time perception can be found first in arts and literature, and then in medical reports and studies. Notable discussions of the effects occur in "Le Club des Hachichin" (1846), a work by French poet Théophile Gautier, and in Les Paradis Artificiels (1860), a work by Charles Baudelaire. French physician Jacques-Joseph Moreau studied the effects of cannabis with the help of Gautier and other artists who experimented with hashish in the Club des Hashischins. Moreau published his findings in Hashish and Mental Illness: Psychological Studies (1846), noting that hashish caused "errors of time and space" and "time dragging".

Later, in 1958, South African physician Frances Ames studied the effects of cannabis extract, noting the "disordered time perception" experienced by her subjects where "brief periods seemed immensely long". American poet Allen Ginsberg's "First Manifesto to End the Bringdown" (1966) noted that "the vast majority all over the world who have smoked the several breaths necessary to feel the effect, adjust to the strangely familiar sensation of Time slow-down." American physician Jerome Groopman of Harvard Medical School, reported that the "perception of time is altered, generally with perceived time faster than clock time" in people who have ingested cannabis. Multiple review studies have confirmed these reports.

== In music ==
Most notably, cannabis has had a long association among musicians and the music industry. Musicians and audiences who use cannabis often report the primary subjective effects as a distortion of time perception, which acts to augment both musical performance and music appreciation. Contrary to the effects produced by stimulant use, cannabis use is reported to give the performer or listener a subjective perception of time expansion, resulting in the overestimation of the passage of time. Dosage and method of ingestion may lessen or accentuate this effect. This subjective effect of time expansion is responsible for most of the anecdotal accounts in the literature. The effects of cannabis on musicians and those who listen to music are the subject of research in social pharmacology and music therapy.

== See also ==
- Alice in Wonderland syndrome
- Frederick T. Melges
