= Cannabis (drug) =

Psychoactive drug from the cannabis plant

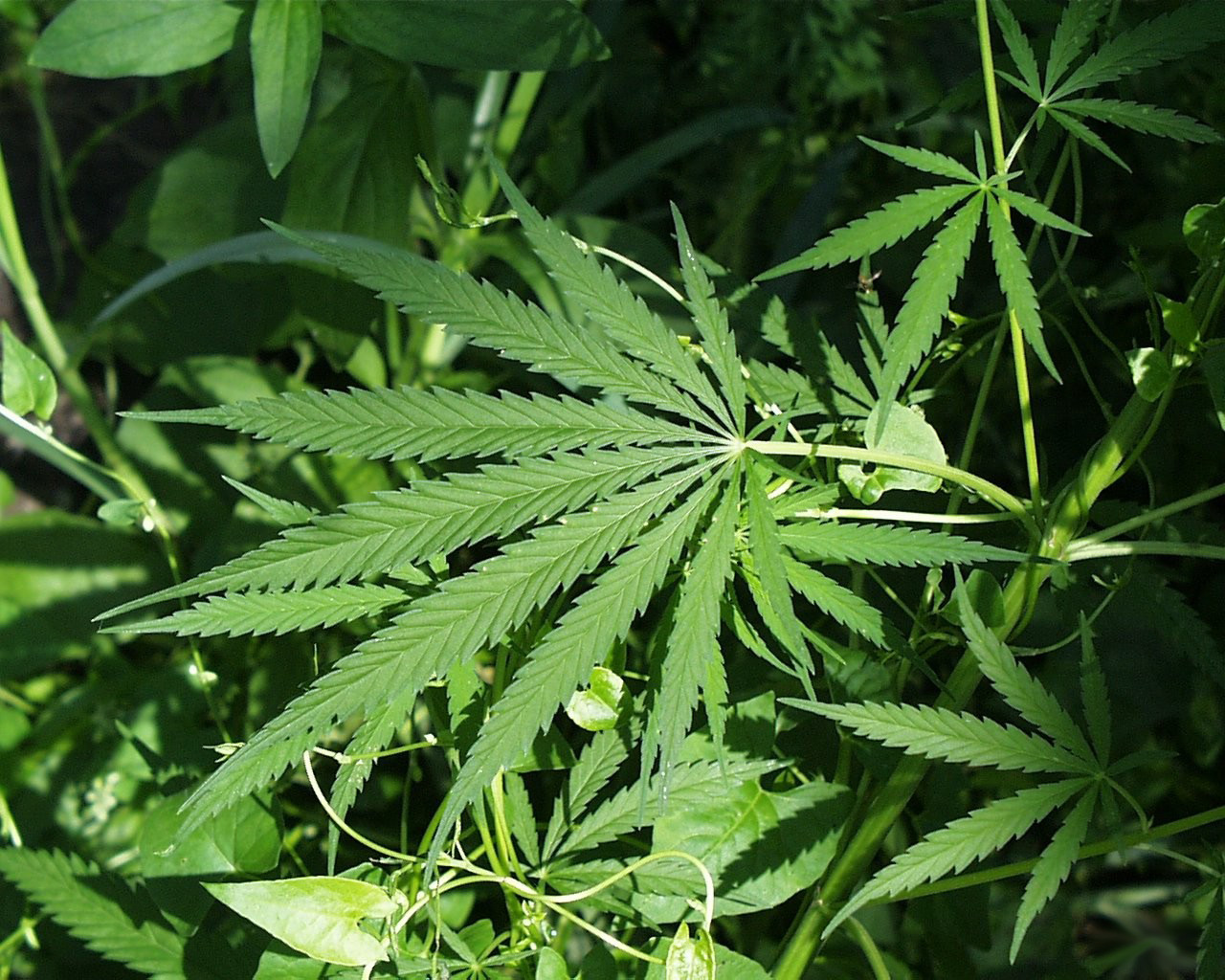
- View of cannabis leaf
- Pronunciation: Cannabis: /ˈkænəbɪs/ Marijuana: /ˌmærəˈwɑːnə/
- Source plant(s): Cannabis sativa, Cannabis indica, Cannabis ruderalis (Note: Pure varieties of C. ruderalis are rarely used for recreational purposes due to their negligible amounts of THC.)
- Part(s) of plant: Flower and fruit
- Geographic origin: Central or South Asia
- Active ingredients: Tetrahydrocannabinol, cannabidiol, cannabinol, tetrahydrocannabivarin
- Main producers: Afghanistan, Canada, China, Colombia, India, Jamaica, Lebanon, Mexico, Morocco, Netherlands, Pakistan, Paraguay, Spain, Thailand, Turkey, United Kingdom, United States
- Legal status: AU: S8 (Controlled drug); BR: Class E (Controlled plants); CA: Unscheduled; DE: legal under the ruling of Cannabisgesetz; NZ: Class B (concentrate) Class C (plant); UK: Class B; US: Legal for medical or recreational use in most states; Schedule III for licensed medical products/Schedule I for unlicensed products at the federal level; UN: Narcotic Schedule I (cannabis, resin, extract, tinctures); Psychotropic Schedule I or II (pure isomers of THC); SE: THC over 0,3% is schedule II and illegal without a prescription

Cannabis (/ˈkænəbɪs/), commonly known as marijuana (/ˌmærəˈwɑːnə/), weed, pot, Mary Jane, and ganja, among other names, is a non-chemically uniform psychoactive drug from the Cannabis plant. Native to Central or South Asia, cannabis has been used as a drug for both recreational and entheogenic purposes and in various traditional medicines for centuries. Tetrahydrocannabinol (THC) is the main psychoactive component of cannabis, and is one of the 483 known compounds in the plant along with at least 65 other cannabinoids, such as cannabidiol (CBD). Cannabis can be used by smoking, vaporizing, within food, or as an extract.

Cannabis has various mental and physical effects, which include euphoria, altered states of mind and sense of time, difficulty concentrating, impaired short-term memory, impaired body movement (balance and fine psychomotor control), relaxation, and an increase in appetite. Onset of effects is felt within minutes when smoked, but may take up to 90 minutes when eaten (as orally consumed drugs must be digested and absorbed). The effects last for two to six hours, depending on the amount used. At high doses, mental effects can include anxiety, delusions (including ideas of reference), hallucinations, panic, paranoia, and cannabis-induced psychotic disorder (CIPD). There is a strong relation between cannabis use and the risk of psychosis, with cannabis use considered a contributory cause of psychosis. Physical effects include increased heart rate, difficulty breathing, nausea, and behavioral problems in children whose mothers used cannabis during pregnancy; short-term side effects may also include dry mouth and red eyes. Long-term adverse effects may include addiction, decreased mental ability in those who started regular use as adolescents, heart disease, chronic coughing, susceptibility to respiratory infections, and cannabinoid hyperemesis syndrome.

Cannabis is mostly used recreationally or as a medicinal drug, although it may also be used for spiritual purposes. Evidence supports only a few approved uses of cannabinoids and most medical claims, such as efficacy for insomnia or acute pain, lack sufficient evidence. In 2013, between 128 and 232 million people used cannabis (2.7% to 4.9% of the global population between the ages of 15 and 65). It is the most commonly used largely-illegal drug in the world, with the highest use among adults in Zambia, the United States, Canada, and Nigeria. Since the 1970s, the potency of illicit cannabis has increased, with THC levels rising and CBD levels dropping.

Cannabis plants have been grown since at least the 3rd millennium BCE and there is evidence of it being smoked for its psychoactive effects around 500 BCE in the Pamir Mountains, Central Asia. Since the 14th century, cannabis has been subject to legal restrictions. The possession, use, and cultivation of cannabis has been illegal in most countries since the 20th century. Uruguay became the first country to legalize recreational use of cannabis in 2013. Other countries to do so are Canada, Georgia, Germany, Luxembourg, Malta, South Africa, and Thailand. In the U.S., the recreational use of cannabis is legalized in 24 states, 3 territories, and the District of Columbia, though the drug remains federally illegal. In Australia, it is legalized only in the Australian Capital Territory.

== Etymology ==
The origins of Cannabis are linked to a Scythian word. The ancient Greeks may have learned of the use of cannabis, which they called κάνναβις, by observing Scythian funerals, during which cannabis was consumed. In Akkadian, cannabis was known as qunubu (𐎯𐎫𐎠𐎭𐏂). The word was adopted in to the Hebrew as qaneh bosem (קָנֶה בֹּשׂם).

The Latin term cannabis derived from Greek evolved into Proto-Germanic *xan(a)paz, yielding various Germanic forms (Old Norse hampr, Old English hænep, Old Saxon hanup, Old High German hanaf) and ultimately modern British English "hemp."

== Uses ==
=== Medical ===
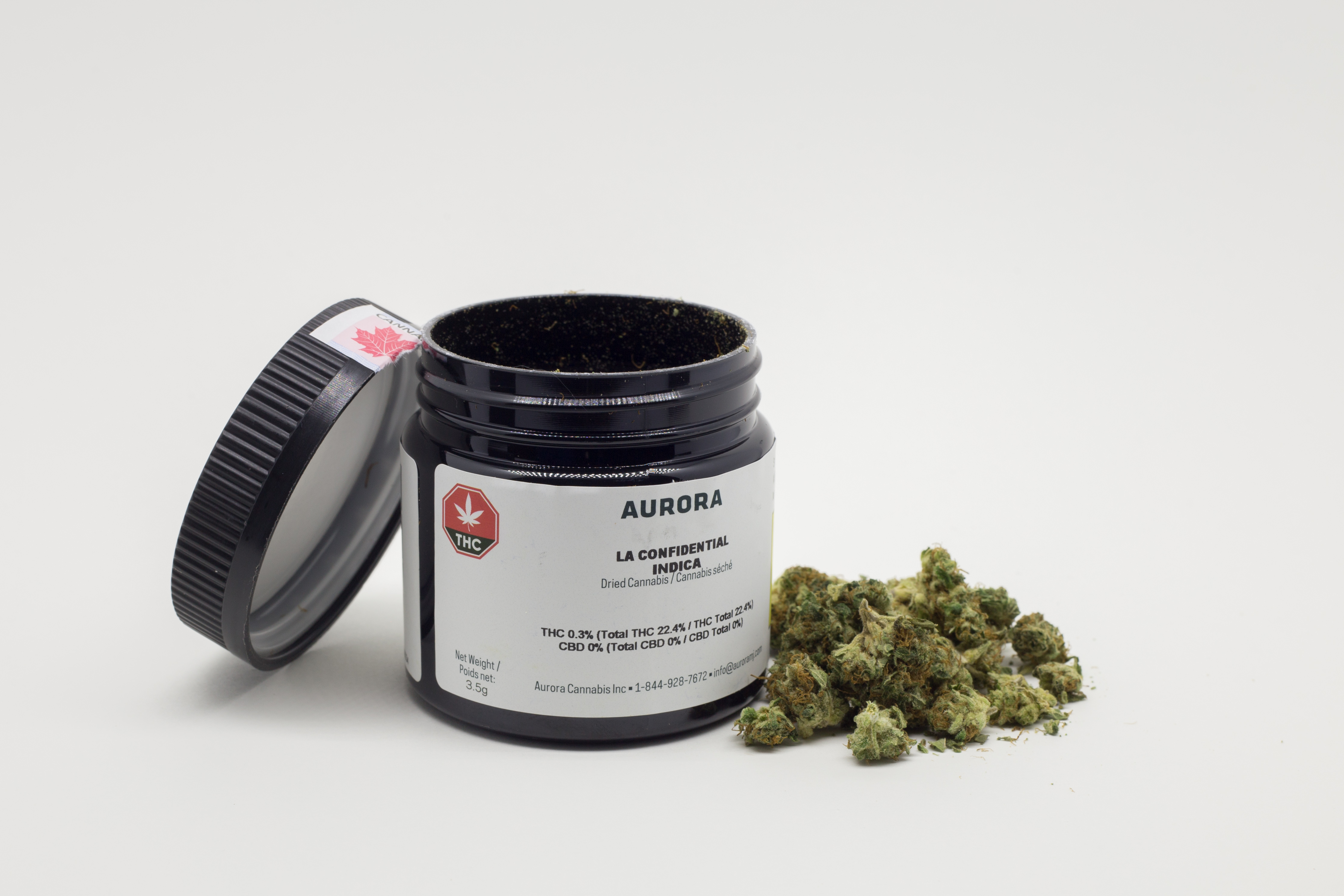
Example of a container and the recreational cannabis purchase in Canada

Medical cannabis, or medical marijuana, refers to the use of herbal cannabis or its preparations to treat disease or improve symptoms. There is no single agreed-upon definition (e.g., cannabinoids derived from cannabis and synthetic cannabinoid analogs are also used). The rigorous scientific study of cannabis as a medicine has been hampered by production restrictions and by the fact that it is classified as an illegal drug by many governments.

Evidence supports only a few approved uses of cannabinoids and most medical claims, such as efficacy for insomnia or acute pain, lack sufficient evidence; benefits, risks, and harm-reduction strategies should be evaluated before clinical recommendations of cannabis or cannabinoids.

There is some evidence suggesting cannabis can be used to reduce nausea and vomiting during chemotherapy, to improve appetite in people with HIV/AIDS, or to treat chronic pain and muscle spasms. Evidence for its use for other medical applications is insufficient for drawing conclusions about safety or efficacy. There is evidence supporting the use of cannabis or its derivatives in the treatment of chemotherapy-induced nausea and vomiting, neuropathic pain, and multiple sclerosis. Lower levels of evidence support its use for AIDS wasting syndrome, epilepsy, rheumatoid arthritis, and glaucoma.

The medical use of cannabis is legal only in a limited number of territories, including Belgium, Australia, the Netherlands, New Zealand, Spain, and many U.S. states. This usage generally requires a prescription, and distribution is usually done within a framework defined by local laws.

=== Recreational ===
Being under the effects of cannabis is usually referred to as being "high". Cannabis consumption has both psychoactive and physiological effects. The "high" experience can vary widely, based (among other things) on the user's prior experience with cannabis, and the type of cannabis consumed. When smoking cannabis, a euphoriant effect can occur within minutes of smoking. Aside from a subjective change in perception and mood, the most common short-term physical and neurological effects include increased heart rate, increased appetite, impairment of short-term and working memory, and impairment of psychomotor coordination.

Additional desired effects from consuming cannabis include relaxation, a general alteration of conscious perception, increased awareness of sensation, increased libido and distortions in the perception of time and space. In some cases, cannabis can lead to dissociative states such as depersonalization and derealization. Cannabis at high doses can produce strong hallucinogenic effects in some people.

=== Spiritual ===
Cannabis has held sacred status in several religions and has served as an entheogen – a chemical substance used in religious, shamanic, or spiritual contexts – in the Indian subcontinent since the Vedic period. The earliest known reports regarding the sacred status of cannabis in the Indian subcontinent come from the Atharva Veda, estimated to have been composed sometime around 1400 BCE. The Hindu god Shiva is described as a cannabis user, known as the "Lord of bhang".

In modern culture, the spiritual use of cannabis has been spread by the disciples of the Rastafari movement who use cannabis as a sacrament and as an aid to meditation.

== Consumption ==
=== Modes of consumption ===
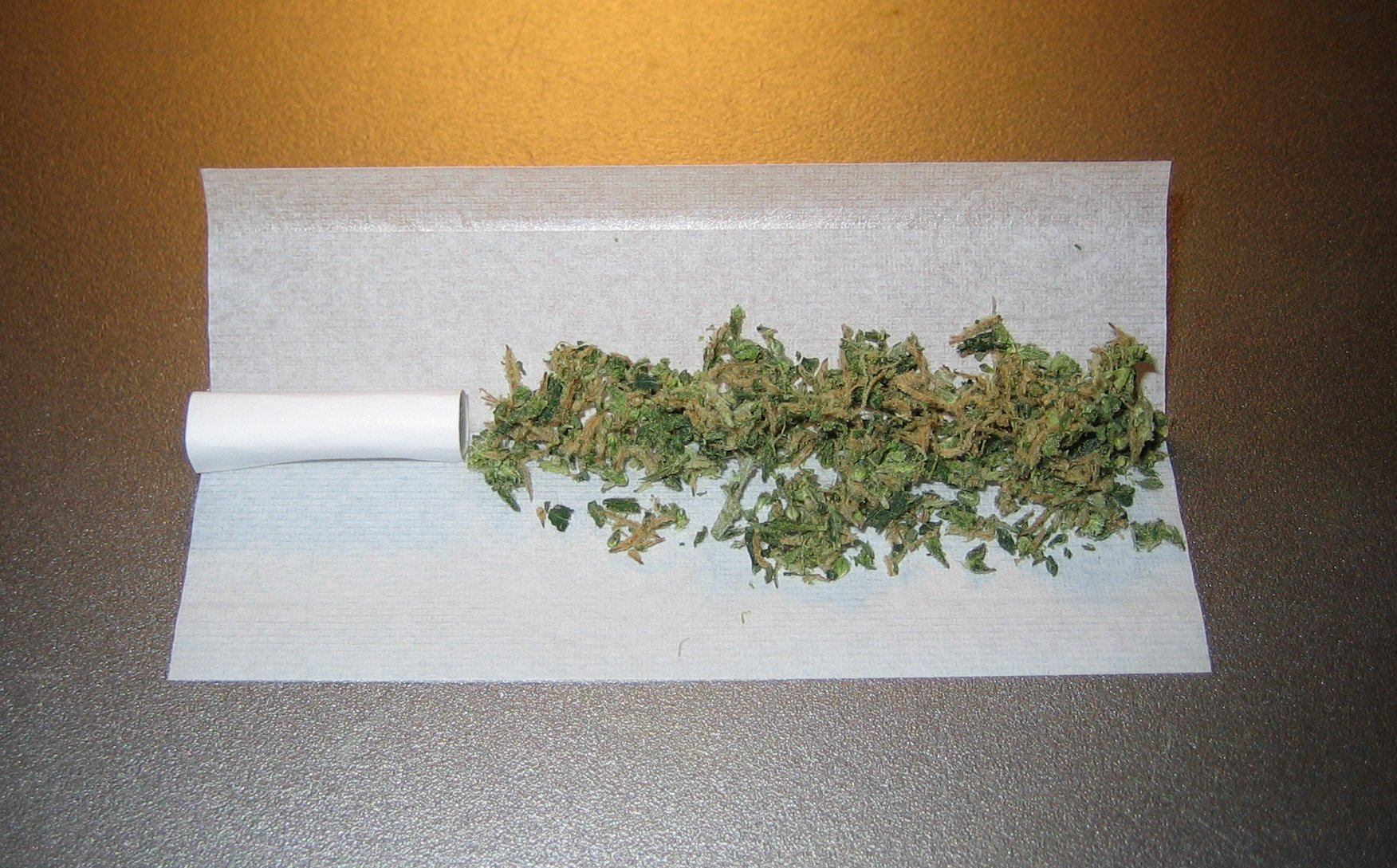
A joint prior to rolling, with a paper handmade filter on the left

Many different ways to consume cannabis involve heat to decarboxylate THCA into THC; common modes include:

- Smoking, involves burning and inhaling cannabinoids ("smoke") from small pipes, bongs (portable versions of hookahs with a water chamber), paper-wrapped joints, tobacco-leaf-wrapped blunts, or the like.
- Vaporizing, heating various forms of cannabis to 165–190 °C (329–374 °F), causing the active ingredients to form vapor without combustion of the plant material (the boiling point of THC is 157 °C (315 °F) at atmospheric pressure).
- Edibles, adding cannabis as an ingredient to a wide variety of foods, including butter and baked goods. In India it is commonly consumed as the beverage bhang.
- Cannabis tea, prepared with attention to the lipophilic quality of THC, which is only slightly water-soluble (2.8 mg per liter), often involving cannabis in a saturated fat.
- Tincture of cannabis, sometimes known as green dragon, is an alcoholic cannabis concentrate.
- Capsules, typically containing cannabis oil, and other dietary supplement products, for which some 220 were approved in Canada in 2018.

=== Consumption by country ===
Global estimates of drug users in 2016 (in millions of users)
Substance	Best estimate	Low estimate	High estimate
Amphetamine- type stimulants	34.16	13.42	55.24
Cannabis	192.15	165.76	234.06
Cocaine	18.20	13.87	22.85
Ecstasy	20.57	8.99	32.34
Opiates	19.38	13.80	26.15
Opioids	34.26	27.01	44.54

In 2013, between 128 and 232 million people used cannabis (2.7% to 4.9% of the global population between the ages of 15 and 65). Cannabis is by far the most widely used illicit substance, with the highest use among adults (as of 2018) in Zambia, the United States, Canada, and Nigeria.

==== United States ====
Between 1973 and 1978, eleven states decriminalized marijuana. In 2001, Nevada reduced marijuana possession to a misdemeanor and since 2012, several other states have decriminalized and even legalized marijuana.

In 2018, surveys indicated that almost half of the people in the United States had tried marijuana, 16% had used it in the past year, and 11% had used it in the past month. In 2014, surveys said daily marijuana use amongst US college students had reached its highest level since records began in 1980, rising from 3.5% in 2007 to 5.9% in 2014 and had surpassed daily cigarette use.

In the US, men are over twice as likely to use marijuana as women, and 18–29-year-olds are six times more likely to use as over-65-year-olds. In 2015, a record 44% of the US population has tried marijuana in their lifetime, an increase from 38% in 2013 and 33% in 1985.

Marijuana use in the United States is three times above the global average, but in line with other Western democracies. Forty-four percent of American 12th graders have tried the drug at least once, and the typical age of first-use is 16, similar to the typical age of first-use for alcohol but lower than the first-use age for other illicit drugs.

A 2022 Gallup poll concluded Americans are smoking more marijuana than cigarettes for the first time.

== Adverse effects ==
=== Short-term ===
Main short-term physical effects of cannabis

Acute negative effects may include anxiety and panic, impaired attention and memory, an increased risk of psychotic symptoms, (Note: Psychotic episodes are well-documented and typically resolve within minutes or hours, while symptoms may last longer. The use of a single joint can temporarily induce some psychiatric symptoms.) the inability to think clearly, and an increased risk of accidents. Cannabis impairs a person's driving ability, and THC was the illicit drug most frequently found in the blood of drivers who have been involved in vehicle crashes. Those with THC in their system are from three to seven times more likely to be the cause of vehicle crash than those who had not used either cannabis or alcohol. (Note: A 2016 review also found a statistically significant increase in crash risk associated with marijuana use, but noted that this risk was "of low to medium magnitude." The increase in risk of motor vehicle crash for cannabis use is between 2 and 3 times relative to baseline, whereas that for comparable doses of alcohol is between 6 and 15 times.)

Some immediate undesired side effects include a decrease in short-term memory, dry mouth, impaired motor skills, reddening of the eyes, dizziness, feeling tired and vomiting. Some users may experience an episode of acute psychosis, which usually abates after six hours, but in rare instances, heavy users may find the symptoms continuing for many days.

Legalization has increased the rates at which children are exposed to cannabis, particularly from edibles. While the toxicity and lethality of THC in children is not known, they are at risk for encephalopathy, hypotension, respiratory depression severe enough to require ventilation, somnolence and coma.

=== Fatality ===
A systematic meta analysis showed that cannabis users double the chance of dying from heart disease. Cannabis users had a 29% higher risk of heart attack and a 20% higher risk of stroke than non-users. There is an association between cannabis use and suicide, particularly in younger users.

A 16-month survey of Oregon and Alaska emergency departments found a report of the death of an adult who had been admitted for acute cannabis toxicity.

A recent study in 2025 suggests that individuals diagnosed with cannabis use disorder—characterized by an inability to stop using cannabis despite its negative effects—face a nearly threefold increase in mortality rates compared to those without the condition over a five-year period. The research indicates that people with this disorder are ten times more likely to die by suicide than the general population. Additionally, they have a higher risk of death from trauma, drug poisoning, and lung cancer. In a separate study researchers found an increase in schizophrenia and psychosis cases in Canada linked to cannabis use disorder following the drug's legalization.

=== Long-term ===
Addiction experts in psychiatry, chemistry, pharmacology, forensic science, epidemiology, and the police and legal services engaged in delphic analysis regarding 20 popular recreational drugs. Cannabis was ranked 11th in dependence, 17th in physical harm, and 10th in social harm.

==== Psychological effects ====
A 2015 meta-analysis found that, although a longer period of abstinence was associated with smaller magnitudes of impairment, both retrospective and prospective memory were impaired in cannabis users. The authors concluded that some, but not all, of the deficits associated with cannabis use were reversible. A 2012 meta-analysis found that deficits in most domains of cognition persisted beyond the acute period of intoxication, but was not evident in studies where subjects were abstinent for more than 25 days. Few high quality studies have been performed on the long-term effects of cannabis on cognition, and the results were generally inconsistent. Furthermore, effect sizes of significant findings were generally small. One review concluded that, although most cognitive faculties were unimpaired by cannabis use, residual deficits occurred in executive functions. Impairments in executive functioning are most consistently found in older populations, which may reflect heavier cannabis exposure, or developmental effects associated with adolescent cannabis use. One review found three prospective cohort studies that examined the relationship between self-reported cannabis use and intelligence quotient (IQ). The study following the largest number of heavy cannabis users reported that IQ declined between ages 7–13 and age 38. Poorer school performance and increased incidence of leaving school early were both associated with cannabis use, although a causal relationship was not established. Cannabis users demonstrated increased activity in task-related brain regions, consistent with reduced processing efficiency.

A reduced quality of life is associated with heavy cannabis use, although the relationship is inconsistent and weaker than for tobacco and other substances. The direction of cause and effect, however, is unclear.

The long-term effects of cannabis are not clear. There are concerns surrounding memory and cognition problems, risk of addiction, and the risk of schizophrenia in young people.

==== Neuroimaging ====
Although global abnormalities in white matter and grey matter are not consistently associated with cannabis use, reduced hippocampal volume is consistently found. Amygdala abnormalities are sometimes reported, although findings are inconsistent. There is evidence that amygdala volume is smaller in cannabis users.

Cannabis use is associated with increased recruitment of task-related areas, such as the dorsolateral prefrontal cortex, which is thought to reflect compensatory activity due to reduced processing efficiency. Cannabis use is also associated with downregulation of CB_{1} receptors. The magnitude of down regulation is associated with cumulative cannabis exposure, and is reversed after one month of abstinence. There is limited evidence that chronic cannabis use can reduce levels of glutamate metabolites in the human brain.

=== Cannabis dependence ===
About 9% of those who experiment with marijuana eventually become dependent according to DSM-IV (1994) criteria. A 2013 review estimates daily use is associated with a 10–20% rate of dependence. The highest risk of cannabis dependence is found in those with a history of poor academic achievement, deviant behavior in childhood and adolescence, rebelliousness, poor parental relationships, or a parental history of drug and alcohol problems. Of daily users, about 50% experience withdrawal upon cessation of use (i.e. are dependent), characterized by sleep problems, irritability, dysphoria, and craving. Cannabis withdrawal is less severe than withdrawal from alcohol.

According to DSM-5 criteria, 9% of those who are exposed to cannabis develop cannabis use disorder, compared to 20% for cocaine, 23% for alcohol and 68% for nicotine. Cannabis use disorder in the DSM-5 involves a combination of DSM-IV criteria for cannabis abuse and dependence, plus the addition of craving, without the criterion related to legal troubles.

==== Psychiatric ====
From a clinical perspective, two significant school of thought exists for psychiatric conditions associated with cannabis (or cannabinoids) use: transient, non-persistent psychotic reactions, and longer-lasting, persistent disorders that resemble schizophrenia. The former is formally known as acute cannabis-associated psychotic symptoms (CAPS) or cannabis-induced psychotic disorder (CIPD).

At an epidemiological level, a dose–response relationship exists between cannabis use and increased risk of psychosis and earlier onset of psychosis, with an earlier age of exposure increasing the risk. Synthesising epidemiological, genetic, experimental and preclinical studies, there is credible evidence that cannabis use is a contributory cause of psychosis.

Cannabis may also increase the risk of depression, but insufficient research has been performed to draw a conclusion. A 2014 meta-analysis of longitudinal studies found that cannabis use was associated with a modestly increased risk of developing depressive disorders, particularly among heavy users, although the causal relationship remains uncertain and further research is needed. Cannabis use is associated with increased risk of anxiety disorders, although causality has not been established. A 2025 systematic review and meta-analysis involving more than half a million participants aged 15–30 reported that cannabis use was associated with higher odds of depression (51% higher), anxiety (58%), suicidal ideation (65%), and suicide attempt (87%).

A review in 2019 found that research was insufficient to determine the safety and efficacy of using cannabis to treat schizophrenia, psychosis, or other mental disorders. Another found that cannabis during adolescence was associated with an increased risk of developing depression and suicidal behavior later in life, while finding no effect on anxiety.

==== Physical ====
Heavy, long-term exposure to marijuana may have physical, mental, behavioral and social health consequences. It may be "associated with diseases of the liver (particularly with co-existing hepatitis C), lungs, heart, and vasculature". A 2014 review found that while cannabis use may be less harmful than alcohol use, the recommendation to substitute it for problematic drinking was premature without further study. Various surveys conducted between 2015 and 2019 found that many users of cannabis substitute it for prescription drugs (including opioids), alcohol, and tobacco; most of those who used it in place of alcohol or tobacco either reduced or stopped their intake of the latter substances.

Cannabinoid hyperemesis syndrome (CHS) is a severe condition seen in some chronic cannabis users where they have repeated bouts of uncontrollable vomiting for 24–48 hours. Four cases of death have been reported as a result of CHS.

A limited number of studies have examined the effects of cannabis smoking on the respiratory system. Chronic heavy marijuana smoking is associated with respiratory infections, coughing, production of sputum, wheezing, and other symptoms of chronic bronchitis. The available evidence does not support a causal relationship between cannabis use and chronic obstructive pulmonary disease. Short-term use of cannabis is associated with bronchodilation. Other side effects of cannabis use include cannabinoid hyperemesis syndrome (CHS), a condition which involves recurrent nausea, cramping abdominal pain, and vomiting. A 2025 systematic review and meta-analysis of eight observational studies, including more than 160,000 participants, found that cannabis users had significantly greater odds of having asthma compared with non-users (pooled odds ratio = 1.31; 95% confidence interval 1.19–1.44). Subgroup analyses showed similar associations across both cross-sectional and cohort studies, and a dose-dependent trend was noted in several datasets. The authors concluded that cannabis use, particularly by inhalation, may increase the risk of asthma and recommended monitoring respiratory health among cannabis users.

Cannabis smoke contains thousands of organic and inorganic chemical compounds. This tar is chemically similar to that found in tobacco smoke, and over fifty known carcinogens have been identified in cannabis smoke, including; nitrosamines, reactive aldehydes, and polycyclic aromatic hydrocarbons, including benz[a]pyrene. Cannabis smoke is also inhaled more deeply than tobacco smoke. As of 2015, there is no consensus regarding whether cannabis smoking is associated with an increased risk of cancer. Light and moderate use of cannabis is not believed to increase risk of lung or upper airway cancer. Evidence for causing these cancers is mixed concerning heavy, long-term use. In general there are far lower risks of pulmonary complications for regular cannabis smokers when compared with those of tobacco. A 2015 review found an association between cannabis use and the development of testicular germ cell tumors (TGCTs), particularly non-seminoma TGCTs. Another 2015 meta-analysis found no association between lifetime cannabis use and risk of head or neck cancer. Combustion products are not present when using a vaporizer, consuming THC in pill form, or consuming cannabis foods.

There is concern that cannabis may contribute to cardiovascular disease, but as of 2018, evidence of this relationship was unclear. Research in these events is complicated because cannabis is often used in conjunction with tobacco, and drugs such as alcohol and cocaine that are known to have cardiovascular risk factors. Smoking cannabis has also been shown to increase the risk of myocardial infarction by 4.8 times for the 60 minutes after consumption.

There is preliminary evidence that cannabis interferes with the anticoagulant properties of prescription drugs used for treating blood clots. As of 2019, the mechanisms for the anti-inflammatory and possible pain relieving effects of cannabis were not defined, and there were no governmental regulatory approvals or clinical practices for use of cannabis as a drug.

===== Emergency department visits =====
Emergency room (ER) admissions associated with cannabis use rose significantly from 2012 to 2016; adolescents from age 12–17 had the highest risk. At one Colorado medical center following legalization, approximately two percent of ER admissions were classified as cannabis users. The symptoms of one quarter of these users were partially attributed to cannabis (a total of 2567 out of 449,031 patients); other drugs were sometimes involved. Of these cannabis admissions, one quarter were for acute psychiatric effects, primarily suicidal ideation, depression, and anxiety. An additional third of the cases were for gastrointestinal issues including cannabinoid hyperemesis syndrome.

According to the United States Department of Health and Human Services, there were 455,000 emergency room visits associated with cannabis use in 2011. These statistics include visits in which the patient was treated for a condition induced by or related to recent cannabis use. The drug use must be "implicated" in the emergency department visit, but does not need to be the direct cause of the visit. Most of the illicit drug emergency room visits involved multiple drugs. In 129,000 cases, cannabis was the only implicated drug.

==== Reproductive health ====
Cannabis consumption in pregnancy is an important public health issue. Research has found possible or likely associations between cannabis use and a risk of adverse outcomes in respect of cognitive development, mental health, physical health, and lactation.

=== Secondhand cannabis smoke ===
A 2022 study found that smoking cannabis using a bong can greatly increase background levels of fine particulate matter, a carcinogen, in an enclosed space such as a living room. After 15 minutes, mean levels of particulate matter were more than twice the Environmental Protection Agency hazardous air quality threshold, and after 140 minutes, the concentrations were four times greater than those generated by smoking tobacco using a cigarette or hookah. This suggests secondhand cannabis smoke from bongs may present a health risk to non-smokers.

== Pharmacology ==
=== Mechanism of action ===
THC is a weak partial agonist at CB_{1} receptors, while CBD is a CB_{1} receptor antagonist. The CB_{1} receptor is found primarily in the brain as well as in some peripheral tissues, and the CB_{2} receptor is found primarily in peripheral tissues, but is also expressed in neuroglial cells. THC appears to alter mood and cognition through its agonist actions on the CB_{1} receptors, which inhibit a secondary messenger system (adenylate cyclase) in a dose-dependent manner.

Via CB_{1} receptor activation, THC indirectly increases dopamine release and produces psychotropic effects. CBD also acts as an allosteric modulator of the μ- and δ-opioid receptors. THC also potentiates the effects of the glycine receptors. It is unknown if or how these actions contribute to the effects of cannabis.

=== Pharmacokinetics ===
The high lipid-solubility of cannabinoids results in their persisting in the body for long periods of time. Even after a single administration of THC, detectable levels of THC can be found in the body for weeks or longer (depending on the amount administered and the sensitivity of the assessment method). Investigators have suggested that this is an important factor in marijuana's effects, perhaps because cannabinoids may accumulate in the body, particularly in the lipid membranes of neurons.

== Chemistry ==
=== Chemical composition ===
The main psychoactive component of cannabis is tetrahydrocannabinol (THC), which is formed via decarboxylation of tetrahydrocannabinolic acid (THCA) from the application of heat. Raw leaf is not psychoactive because the cannabinoids are in the form of carboxylic acids. THC is one of the 483 known compounds in the plant, including at least 65 other cannabinoids, such as cannabidiol (CBD).

=== Detection in body fluids ===
THC and its major (inactive) metabolite, THC-COOH, can be measured in blood, urine, hair, oral fluid or sweat using chromatographic techniques as part of a drug use testing program or a forensic investigation of a traffic or other criminal offense. The concentrations obtained from such analyses can often be helpful in distinguishing active use from passive exposure, elapsed time since use, and extent or duration of use. These tests cannot, however, distinguish authorized cannabis smoking for medical purposes from unauthorized recreational smoking. Commercial cannabinoid immunoassays, often employed as the initial screening method when testing physiological specimens for marijuana presence, have different degrees of cross-reactivity with THC and its metabolites. Urine contains predominantly THC-COOH, while hair, oral fluid and sweat contain primarily THC. Blood may contain both substances, with the relative amounts dependent on the recency and extent of usage.

The Duquenois–Levine test is commonly used as a screening test in the field, but it cannot definitively confirm the presence of cannabis, as a large range of substances have been shown to give false positives. Researchers at John Jay College of Criminal Justice reported that dietary zinc supplements can mask the presence of THC and other drugs in urine. However, a 2013 study conducted by researchers at the University of Utah School of Medicine refute the possibility of self-administered zinc producing false-negative urine drug tests.

== Varieties and strains ==
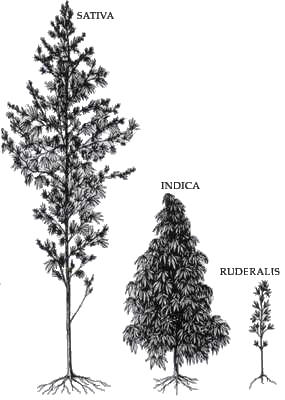
Types of cannabis

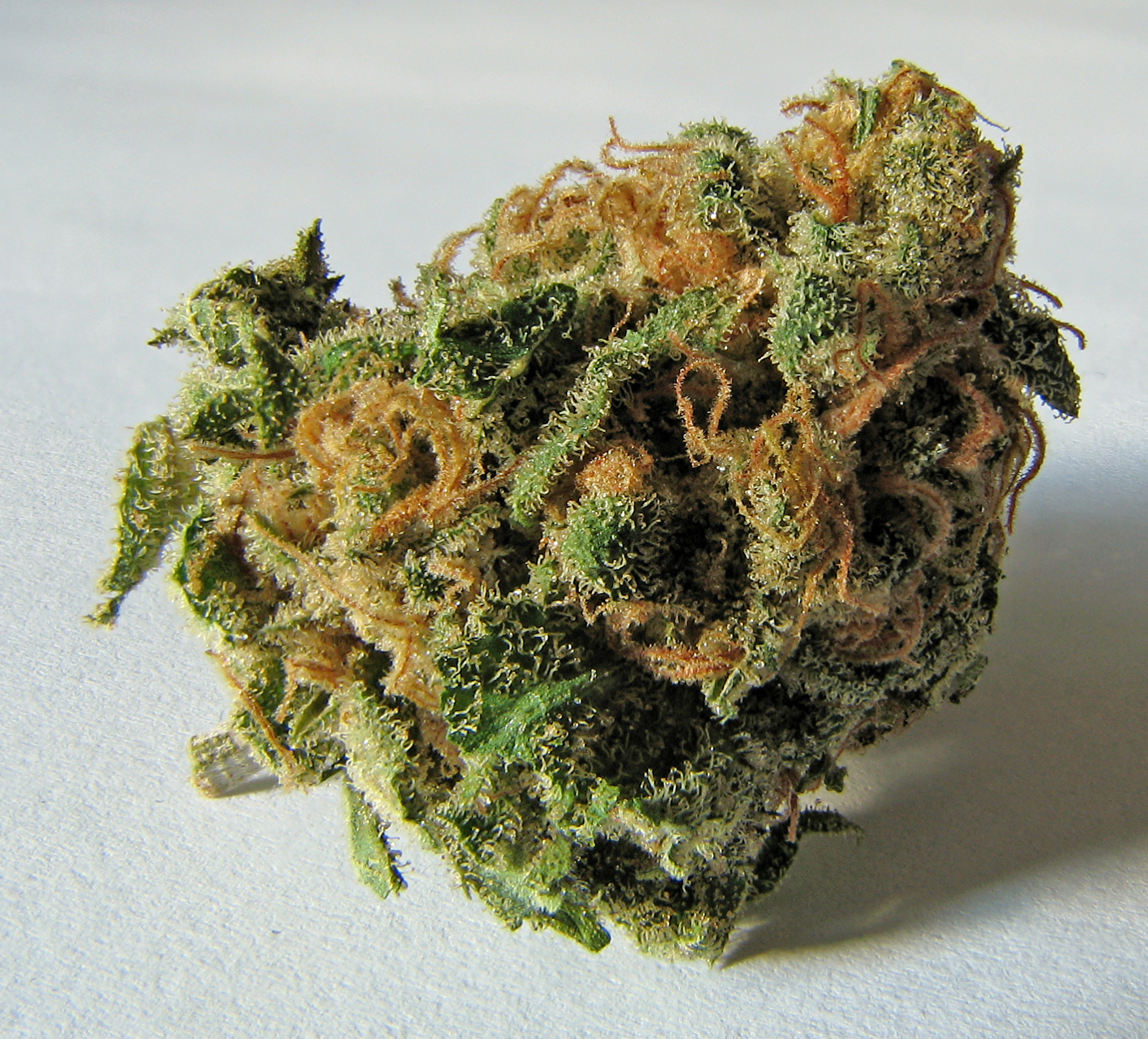
A macro cannabis bud

CBD is a 5-HT_{1A} receptor agonist, which is under laboratory research to determine if it has an anxiolytic effect. It is often claimed that sativa strains provide a more stimulating psychoactive high while indica strains are more sedating with a body high. However, this is disputed by researchers.

There is currently no consistent evidence that cannabis with higher CBD to THC ratios reduced THC induced psychotic symptoms. A 2015 review found that the use of high CBD-to-THC strains of cannabis showed better cognitive function and both lower risk for developing psychosis, as well as a later age of onset of the illness, compared to cannabis with low CBD-to-THC ratios.

=== Psychoactive ingredients ===
According to the United Nations Office on Drugs and Crime (UNODC), "the amount of THC present in a cannabis sample is generally used as a measure of cannabis potency." The three main forms of cannabis products are the flower/fruit, resin (hashish), and oil (hash oil). The UNODC states that cannabis often contains 5% THC content, resin "can contain up to 20% THC content", and that "Cannabis oil may contain more than 60% THC content."

Studies have found that the potency of illicit cannabis has greatly increased since the 1970s, with THC levels rising and CBD levels dropping. It is unclear, however, whether the increase in THC content has caused people to consume more THC or if users adjust based on the potency of the cannabis. It is likely that the higher THC content allows people to ingest less tar. At the same time, CBD levels in seized samples have lowered, in part because of the desire to produce higher THC levels and because more illegal growers cultivate indoors using artificial lights. This helps avoid detection but reduces the CBD production of the plant.

Australia's National Cannabis Prevention and Information Centre (NCPIC) states that the buds (infructescences) of the female Cannabis plant contain the highest concentration of THC, followed by the leaves. The stalks and seeds have "much lower THC levels". The UN states that the leaves can contain ten times less THC than the buds, and the stalks 100 times less THC.

After revisions to cannabis scheduling in the UK, the government moved cannabis back from a class C to a class B drug. A purported reason was the appearance of high potency cannabis. They believe skunk accounts for between 70% and 80% of samples seized by police (despite the fact that skunk can sometimes be incorrectly mistaken for all types of herbal cannabis). Extracts such as hashish and hash oil typically contain more THC than high potency cannabis infructescences.

==== Laced cannabis and synthetic cannabinoids ====
Hemp buds (or low-potency cannabis buds) laced with synthetic cannabinoids started to be sold as cannabis street drug in 2020.

The short-term effects of cannabis can be altered if it has been laced with opioid drugs such as heroin or fentanyl. The added drugs are meant to enhance the psychoactive properties, add to its weight, and increase profitability, despite the increased danger of overdose. (Note: Advocates of legalizing marijuana for recreational use, such as former Illinois state Senator Heather Steans, say that legalizing it would help reduce such hazardous added drugs: "Over 95 percent are buying it on the black market. You don't know what you're buying. It's not a safe product. We've seen it laced with rat poison, fentanyl, all sorts of things. It's funding the cartels and other criminal activity.")

== Preparations ==
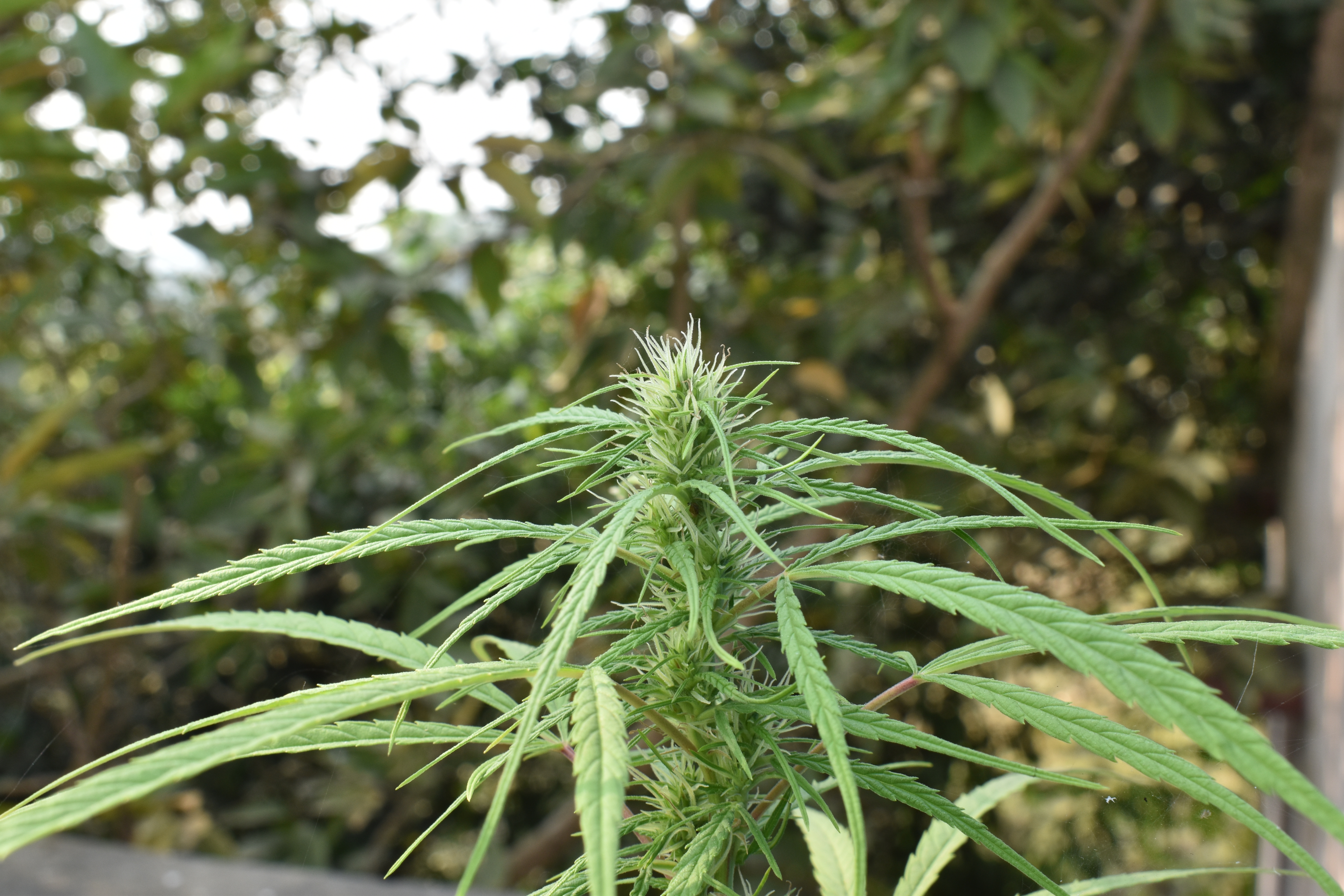
Mature cannabis flower buds

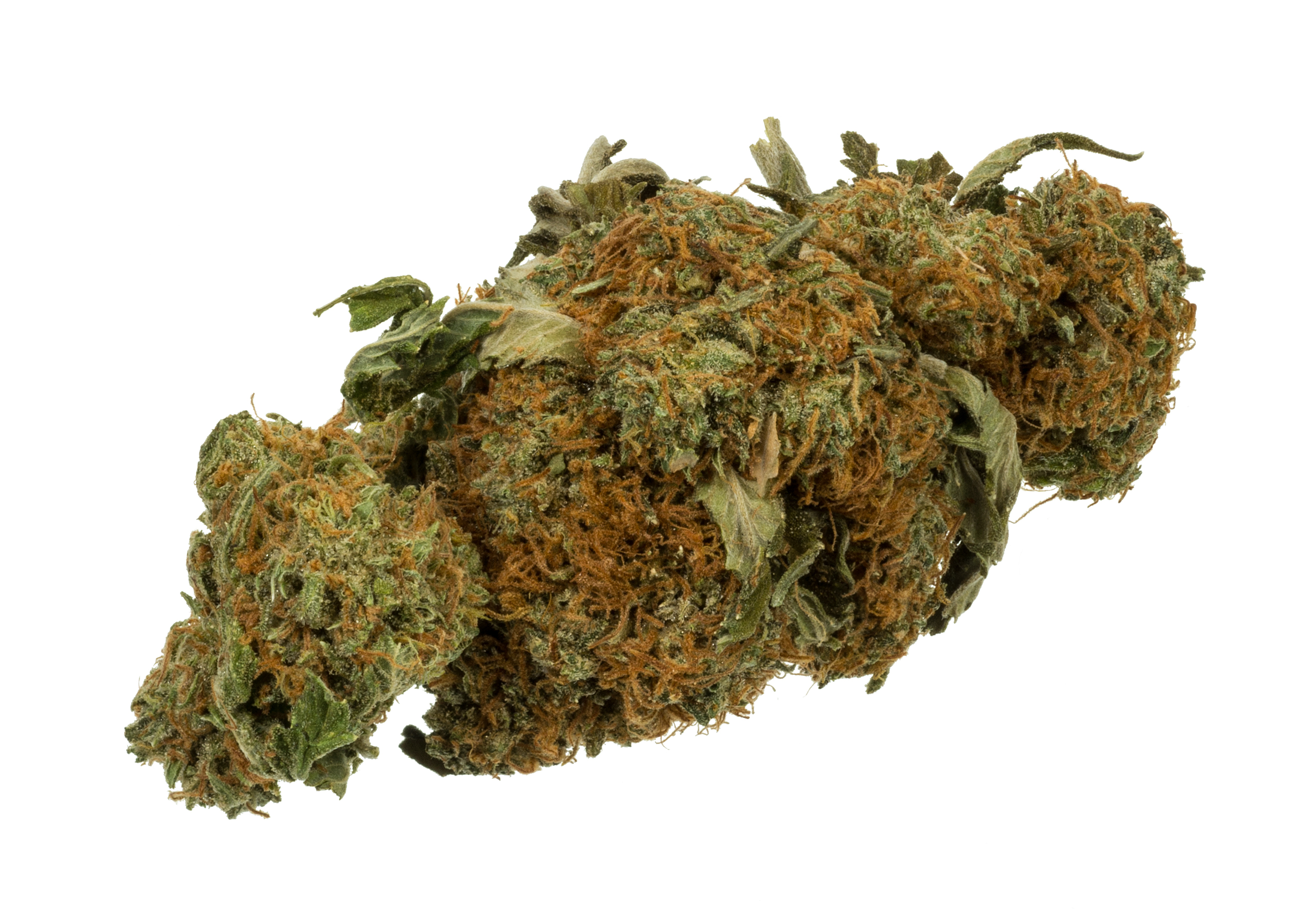
Dried flower buds (marijuana)

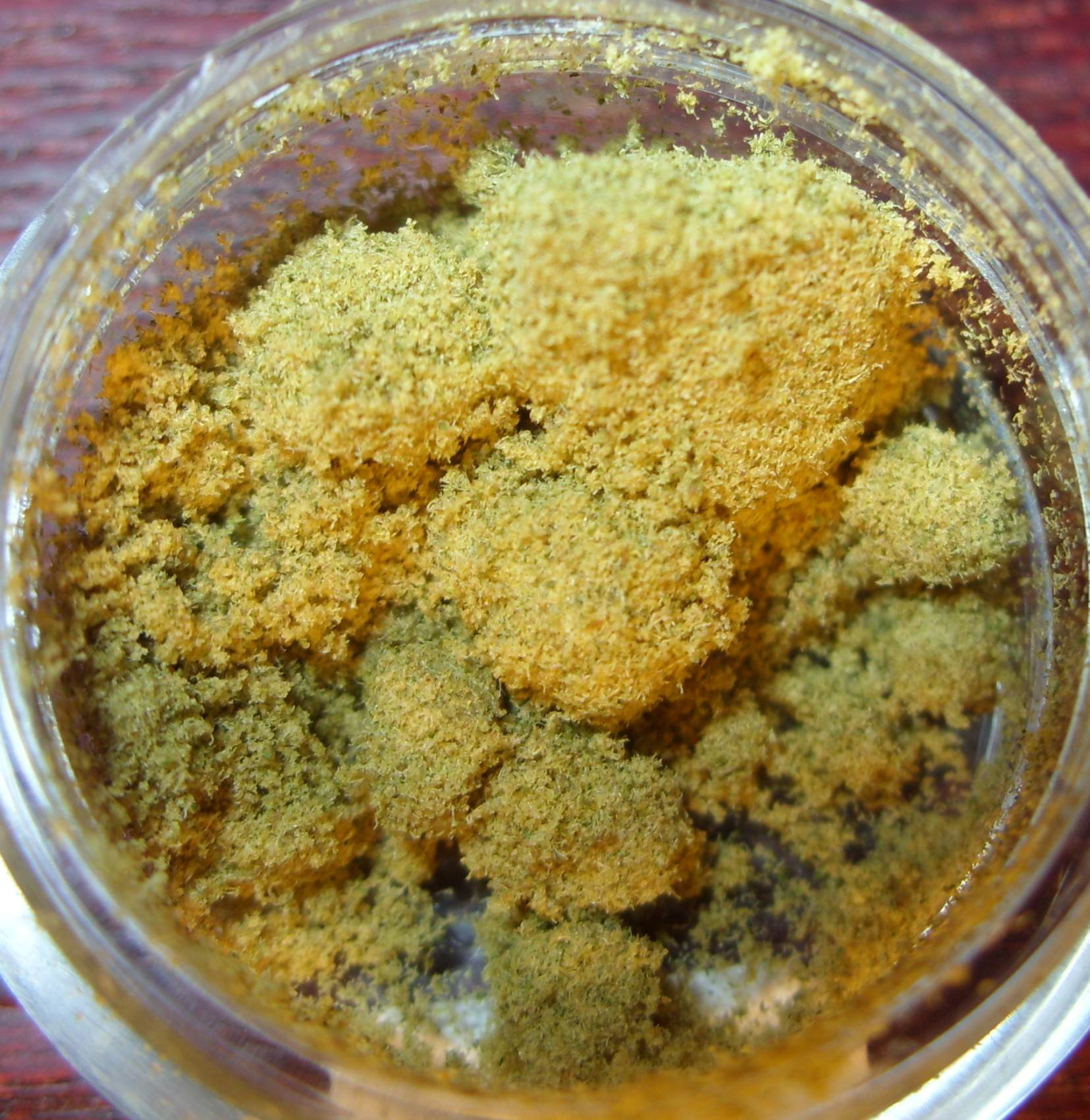
A gram of kief

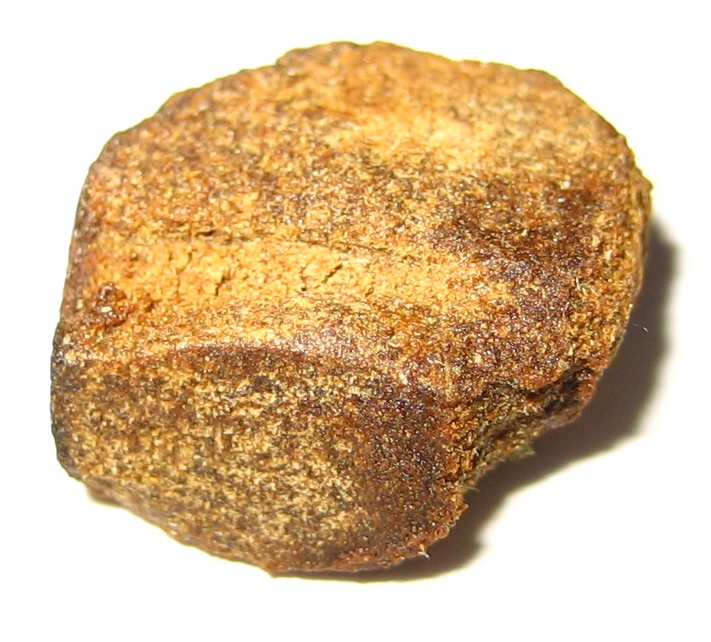
Hashish

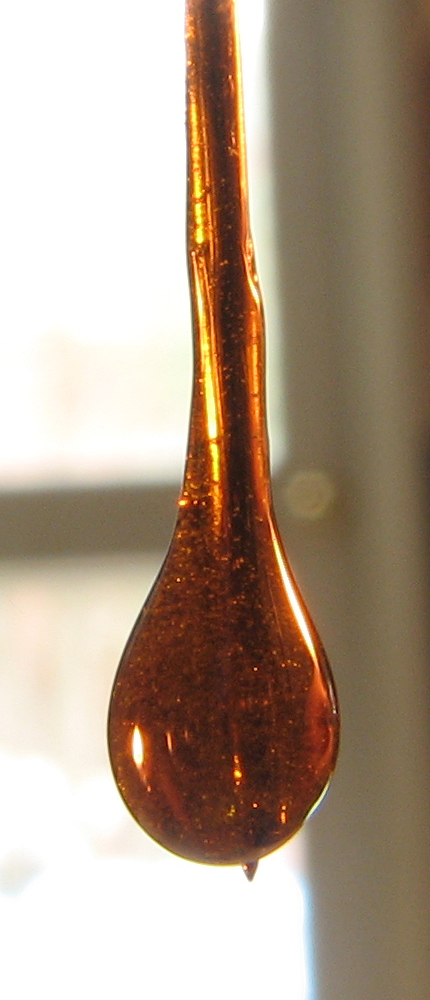
Hash oil

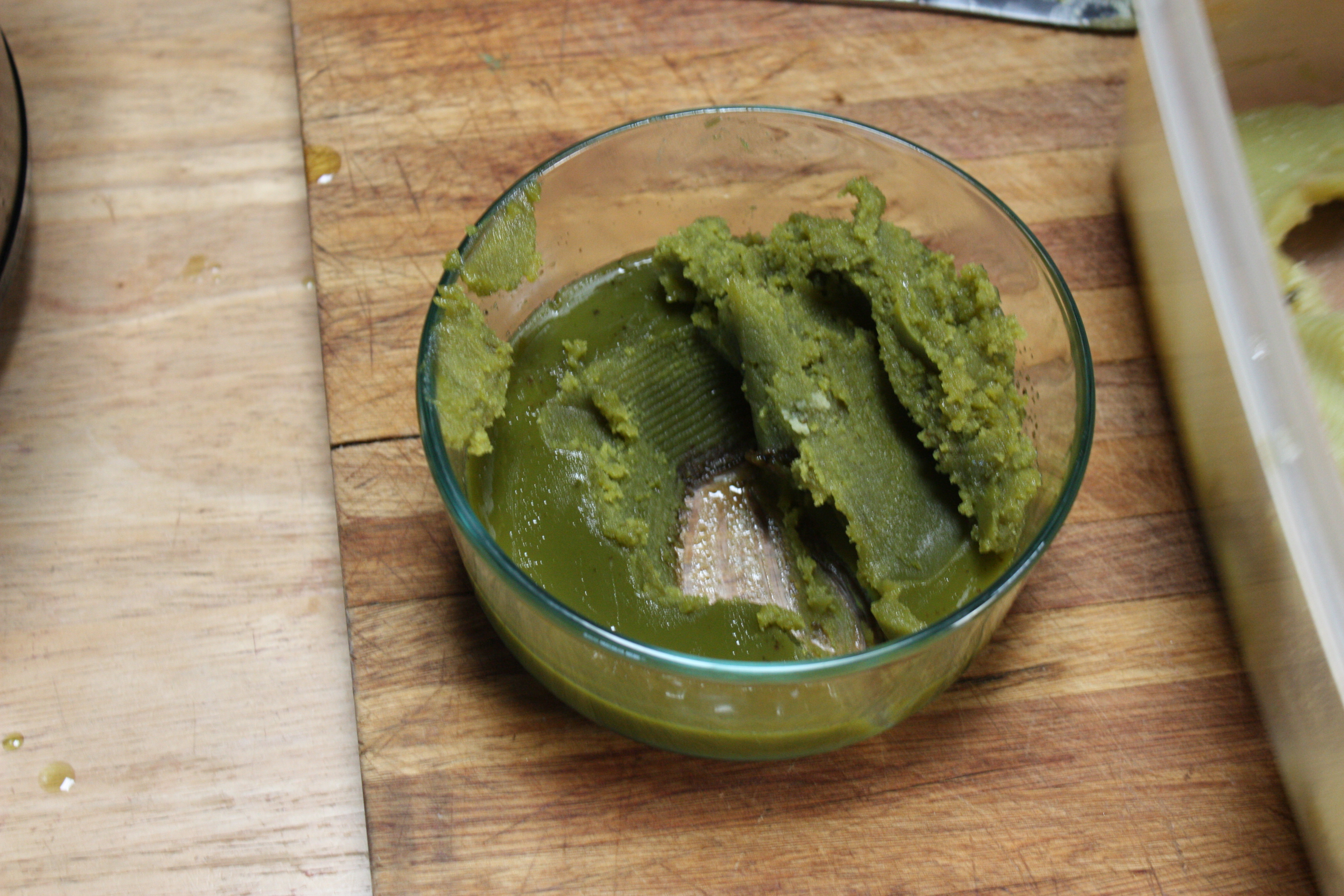
Infusion (dairy butter)

=== Marijuana ===
Marijuana or marihuana (herbal cannabis) consists of the dried flowers and fruits and subtending leaves and stems of the female cannabis plant. This is the most widely consumed form, containing 3% to 20% THC, with reports of up to 33% THC. This is the stock material from which all other preparations are derived. Although herbal cannabis and industrial hemp derive from the same species and contain the psychoactive component (THC), they are distinct strains with unique biochemical compositions and uses. Hemp has lower concentrations of THC and higher concentrations of CBD, which gives lesser psychoactive effects.

=== Kief ===
Kief is a powder, rich in trichomes, that can be sifted from the leaves, flowers and fruits of cannabis plants and either consumed in powder form or compressed to produce cakes of hashish. The term derives from colloquial Arabic كيف kēf/kīf, meaning pleasure.

=== Hashish ===
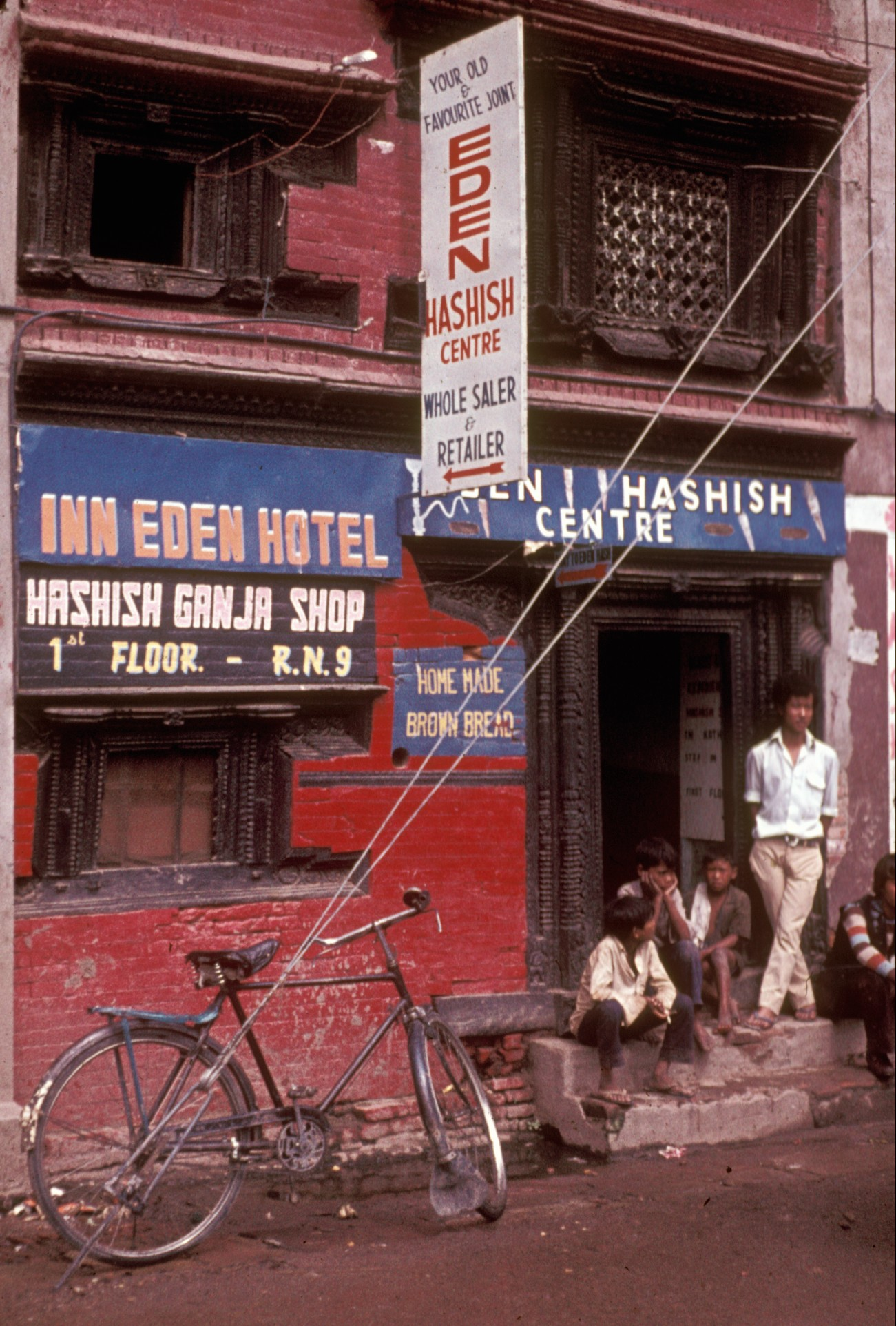
Legal hashish shop in Kathmandu, Nepal in 1973

Hashish (also spelled hasheesh, hashisha, or simply hash) is a concentrated resin cake or ball produced from pressed kief, the detached trichomes and fine material that falls off cannabis fruits, flowers and leaves, or from scraping the resin from the surface of the plants and rolling it into balls. It varies in color from black to golden brown depending upon the purity and variety of cultivar it was obtained from. It can be consumed orally or smoked, and is also vaporized, or 'vaped'. The term "rosin hash" refers to a high-quality, solventless product obtained through heat and pressure.

=== Tincture ===
Cannabinoids can be extracted from cannabis plant matter using high-proof spirits (often grain alcohol) to create a tincture, often called "green dragon". Nabiximols is a branded product name from a tincture manufacturing pharmaceutical company.

=== Hash oil ===
Hash oil is a resinous matrix of cannabinoids obtained from the cannabis plant by solvent extraction, formed into a hardened or viscous mass. It can be the most potent of the main cannabis products because of its high level of psychoactive compound per volume, which can vary depending on the plant's mix of essential oils and psychoactive compounds. Butane and supercritical carbon dioxide hash oil have become popular in recent years.

=== Infusions ===
There are many varieties of cannabis infusions owing to the variety of non-volatile solvents used. The plant material is mixed with the solvent and then pressed and filtered to express the oils of the plant into the solvent. Examples of solvents used in this process are cocoa butter, dairy butter, cooking oil, glycerine, and skin moisturizers. Depending on the solvent, these may be used in cannabis foods or applied topically.

=== Marihuana prensada ===
Marihuana prensada ('pressed marijuana') is a cannabis-derived product widespread among the lower classes of South America, especially in the 1990s. Locally it is known as "paraguayo" or "paragua", since its main producer is Paraguay. Marijuana is dried and mixed with binding agents that make it toxic and highly harmful to health. It is cut into the shape of bricks (ladrillos) and sold cheaply in Argentina, Brazil, Chile, Peru, Venezuela, and the United States.

== History ==
=== Ancient history ===
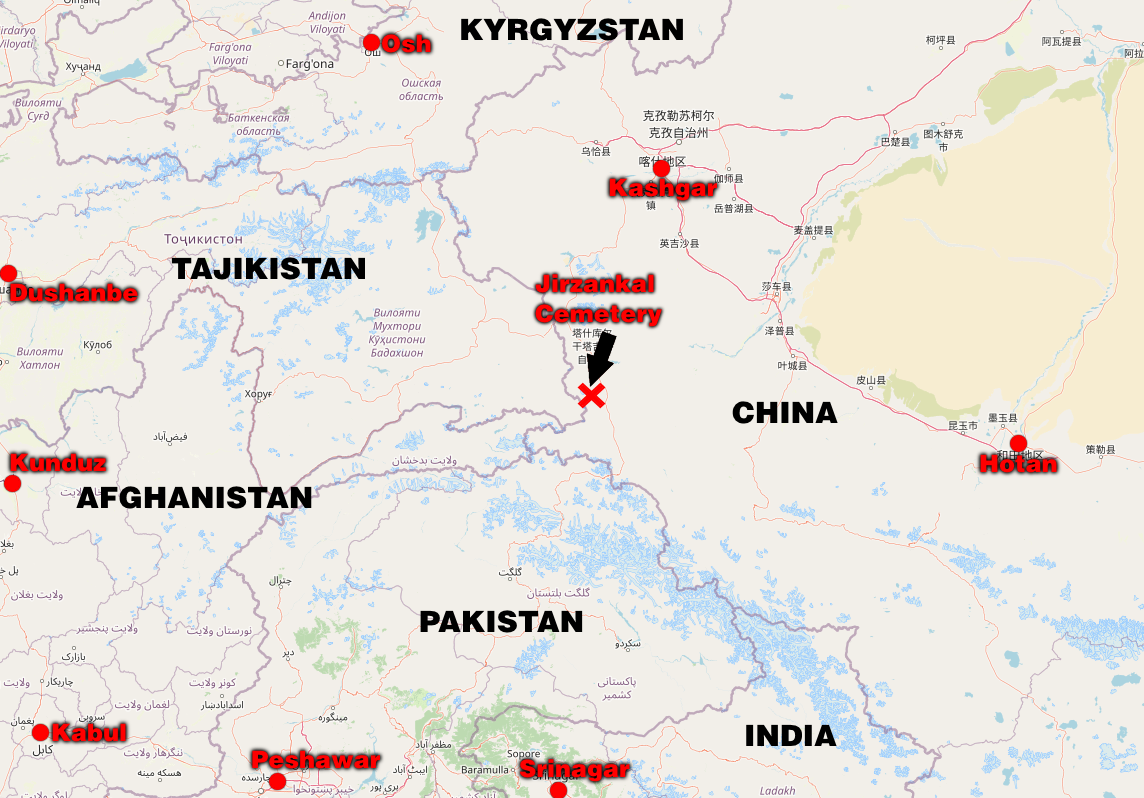
Present-day map of the Jirzankal Cemetery, site of the earliest evidence of cannabis smoking

Cannabis is indigenous to Central or South Asia and its uses for fabric and rope dates back to the Neolithic age in China and Japan. It is unclear when cannabis first became known for its psychoactive properties. The oldest archeological evidence for the burning of cannabis was found in Romanian kurgans dated 3,500 BC, and scholars suggest that the drug was first used in ritual ceremonies by Proto-Indo-European tribes living in the Pontic-Caspian steppe during the Chalcolithic period, a custom they eventually spread throughout Western Eurasia during the Indo-European migrations. Some research suggests that the ancient Indo-Iranian drug soma, mentioned in the Vedas, sometimes contained cannabis. This is based on the discovery of a basin containing cannabis in a shrine of the second millennium BC in Turkmenistan.

Cannabis was known to the ancient Assyrians, who discovered its psychoactive properties through the Iranians. Using it in some religious ceremonies, they called it qunubu (meaning "way to produce smoke"), a probable origin of the modern word cannabis. The Iranians also introduced cannabis to the Scythians, Thracians and Dacians, whose shamans (the kapnobatai – "those who walk on smoke/clouds") burned cannabis infructescence to induce trance. The plant was used in China before 2800 BC, and found therapeutic use in India by 1000 BC, where it was used in food and drink, including bhang.

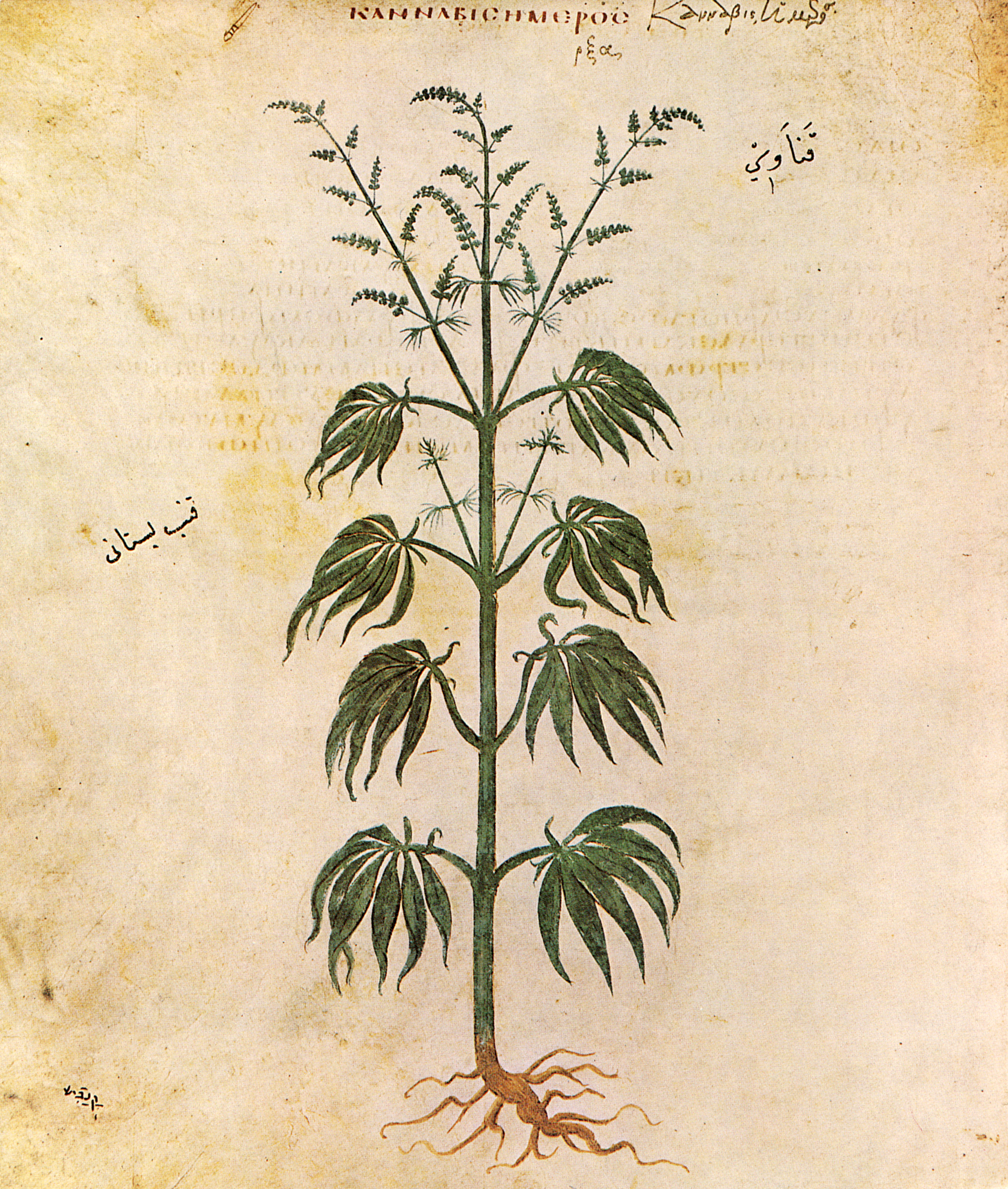
Cannabis sativa from Vienna Dioscurides, c. 512 CE

Cannabis has an ancient history of ritual use and has been used by religions around the world. It has been used as a drug for both recreational and entheogenic purposes and in various traditional medicines for centuries. The earliest evidence of cannabis smoking has been found in the 2,500-year-old tombs of Jirzankal Cemetery in the Pamir Mountains in Western China, where cannabis residue were found in burners with charred pebbles possibly used during funeral rituals. Hemp seeds discovered by archaeologists at Pazyryk suggest early ceremonial practices like eating by the Scythians occurred during the 5th to 2nd century BC, confirming previous historical reports by Herodotus. It was used by Muslims in various Sufi orders as early as the Mamluk period, for example by the Qalandars. Smoking pipes uncovered in Ethiopia and carbon-dated to around c. AD 1320 were found to have traces of cannabis.

=== Modern history ===
Cannabis was introduced to the New World by the Spaniards in 1530–1545. Following an 1836–1840 travel in North Africa and the Middle East, French physician Jacques-Joseph Moreau wrote on the psychological effects of cannabis use; he founded the Paris' Club des Hashischins in 1844. In 1842, Irish physician William Brooke O'Shaughnessy, who had studied the drug while working as a medical officer in Bengal with the East India Company, brought a quantity of cannabis with him on his return to Britain, provoking renewed interest in the West. Examples of classic literature of the period featuring cannabis include Les paradis artificiels (1860) by Charles Baudelaire and The Hasheesh Eater (1857) by Fitz Hugh Ludlow.

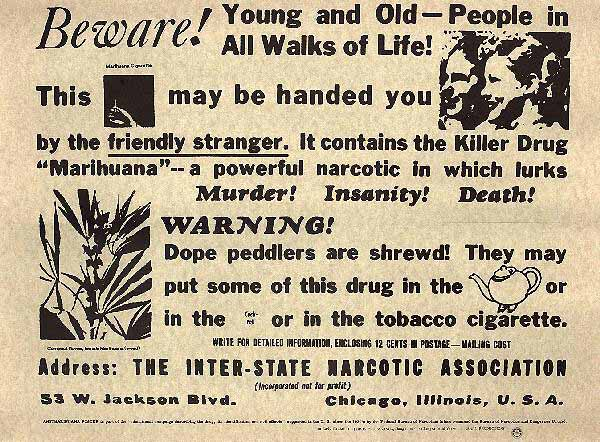
Anti-cannabis propaganda from 1935

Cannabis was criminalized in some countries beginning in the 14th century and was illegal in most countries by the middle of the 20th century. The colonial government of Mauritius banned cannabis in 1840 over concerns on its effect on Indian indentured workers; the same occurred in Singapore in 1870. In the United States, the first restrictions on sale of cannabis came in 1906 (in the District of Columbia). Canada criminalized cannabis in The Opium and Narcotic Drug Act, 1923, before any reports of the use of the drug in Canada, but eventually legalized its consumption for recreational and medicinal purposes in 2018.

In 1925, a compromise was made at an international conference in Geneva about the Second International Opium Convention that banned exportation of "Indian hemp" to countries that had prohibited its use, and requiring importing countries to issue certificates approving the importation and stating that the shipment was required "exclusively for medical or scientific purposes". It also required parties to "exercise an effective control of such a nature as to prevent the illicit international traffic in Indian hemp and especially in the resin". In the United States in 1937, the Marihuana Tax Act was passed, and prohibited the production of hemp in addition to cannabis.

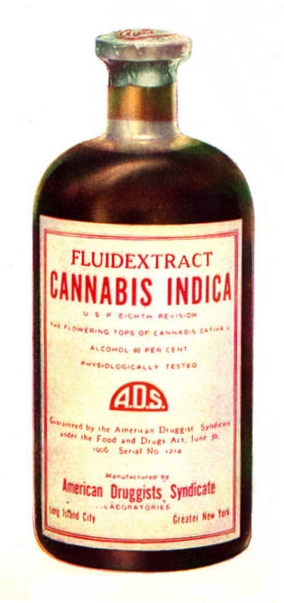
Cannabis indica fluid extract, American Druggists Syndicate (pre-1937)

In 1972, the Dutch government divided drugs into more- and less-dangerous categories, with cannabis being in the lesser category. Accordingly, possession of 30 grams (1.1 oz) or less was made a misdemeanor. Cannabis has been available for recreational use in coffee shops since 1976. Cannabis products are only sold openly in certain local "coffeeshops" and possession of up to 5 grams (0.18 oz) for personal use is decriminalized, however: the police may still confiscate it, which often happens in car checks near the border. Other types of sales and transportation are not permitted, although the general approach toward cannabis was lenient even before official decriminalization.

In Uruguay, President Jose Mujica signed legislation to legalize recreational cannabis in December 2013, making Uruguay the first country in the modern era to legalize cannabis. In August 2014, Uruguay legalized growing up to six plants at home, as well as the formation of growing clubs (Cannabis social club), and a state-controlled marijuana dispensary regime.

As of 17 October 2018, when recreational use of cannabis was legalized in Canada, dietary supplements for human use and veterinary health products containing not more than 10 parts per million of THC extract were approved for marketing; Nabiximols (as Sativex) is used as a prescription drug in Canada.

The United Nations' World Drug Report stated that cannabis "was the world's most widely produced, trafficked, and consumed drug in the world in 2010", and estimated between 128 million and 238 million users globally in 2015.

== Culture, legality and economics ==
=== Culture ===
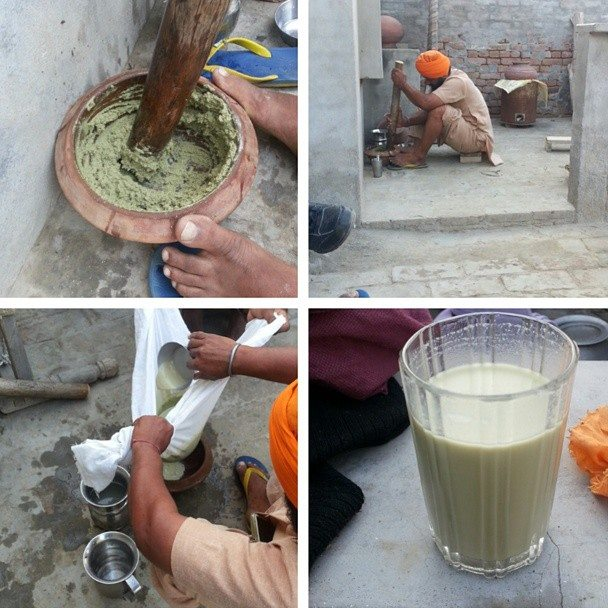
Process of making bhang in a village in Punjab, India. On the Indian festival of colors, Holi, it is a customary addition to some intoxicating drinks.

Cannabis has been one of the most used psychoactive drugs in the world since the late 20th century, following only tobacco and alcohol in popularity. According to Vera Rubin, the use of cannabis has been encompassed by two major cultural complexes over time: a continuous, traditional folk stream, and a more circumscribed, contemporary configuration. The former involves both sacred and secular use, and is usually based on small-scale cultivation: the use of the plant for cordage, clothing, medicine, food, and a "general use as an euphoriant and symbol of fellowship."

The second stream of expansion of cannabis use encompasses "the use of hemp for commercial manufacturers utilizing large-scale cultivation primarily as a fiber for mercantile purposes"; but it is also linked to the search for psychedelic experiences (which can be traced back to the formation of the Parisian Club des Hashischins).

=== Legality ===
Legal status of cannabis possession for non-medical use Legal Illegal but decriminalized Illegal but often unenforced Illegal See also countries that have legalized medical use of cannabis.

Since the beginning of the 20th century, most countries have enacted laws against the cultivation, possession or transfer of cannabis. These laws have had an adverse effect on cannabis cultivation for non-recreational purposes, but there are many regions where handling of cannabis is legal or licensed. Many jurisdictions have lessened the penalties for possession of small quantities of cannabis so that it is punished by confiscation and sometimes a fine, rather than imprisonment, focusing more on those who traffic the drug on the black market.

In some areas where cannabis use had been historically tolerated, new restrictions were instituted, such as the closing of cannabis coffee shops near the borders of the Netherlands, and closing of coffee shops near secondary schools in the Netherlands. In Copenhagen, Denmark, in 2014, Mayor Frank Jensen discussed possibilities for the city to legalize cannabis production and commerce.

Some jurisdictions use free voluntary or mandatory treatment programs for frequent known users. Simple possession can carry long prison terms in some countries, particularly in East Asia, where the sale of cannabis may lead to a sentence of life in prison or even execution. Political parties, non-profit organizations, and causes based on the legalization of medical cannabis or legalizing the plant entirely (with some restrictions) have emerged in such countries as China and Thailand.

In December 2012, the U.S. state of Washington became the first state to officially legalize cannabis in a state law (Washington Initiative 502) (but still illegal by federal law), with the state of Colorado following close behind (Colorado Amendment 64). On 1 January 2013, the first cannabis "club" for private marijuana smoking (no buying or selling, however) was allowed for the first time in Colorado. The California Supreme Court decided in May 2013 that local governments can ban medical cannabis dispensaries despite a state law in California that permits the use of cannabis for medical purposes. At least 180 cities across California have enacted bans in recent years.

President Biden discusses rescheduling of cannabis.

On 30 April 2024, the United States Department of Justice announced it would move to reclassify cannabis from a Schedule I controlled substance to the somewhat less restricted Schedule III. On 18 December 2025, Donald Trump signed an executive order to reclassify cannabis as a Schedule III drug.

In December 2013, Uruguay became the first country to legalize growing, sale and use of cannabis. After a long delay in implementing the retail component of the law, in 2017 sixteen pharmacies were authorized to sell cannabis commercially. On 19 June 2018, the Canadian Senate passed a bill and Prime Minister Justin Trudeau announced the effective legalization date as 17 October 2018. Canada is the second country to legalize the drug.

In November 2015, Uttarakhand became the first state of India to legalize the cultivation of hemp for industrial purposes. Usage within the Hindu and Buddhist cultures of the Indian subcontinent is common, with many street vendors in India openly selling products infused with cannabis, and traditional medical practitioners in Sri Lanka selling products infused with cannabis for recreational purposes and well as for religious celebrations. Indian laws criminalizing cannabis date back to the colonial period. India and Sri Lanka have allowed cannabis to be taken in the context of traditional culture for recreational/celebratory purposes and also for medicinal purposes.

On 17 October 2015, Australian health minister Sussan Ley presented a new law that will allow the cultivation of cannabis for scientific research and medical trials on patients.

On 17 October 2018, Canada legalized cannabis for recreational adult use making it the second country in the world to do so after Uruguay and the first G7 nation. This legalization comes with regulation similar to that of alcohol in Canada, age restrictions, limiting home production, distribution, consumption areas and sale times. Laws around use vary from province to province including age limits, retail structure, and growing at home. The Canadian Licensed Producer system aims to become the Gold Standard in the world for safe and secure cannabis production, including provisions for a robust craft cannabis industry where many expect opportunities for experimenting with different strains.

As the drug has increasingly been seen as a health issue instead of criminal behavior, cannabis has also been legalized or decriminalized in: Czech Republic, Colombia, Ecuador, Portugal, South Africa and Canada. Medical marijuana was legalized in Mexico in mid-2017 and legalized for recreational use in June 2021.

Germany legalized cannabis for recreational use in April 2024.

==== Legal status by country ====
As of 2022, Uruguay and Canada are the only countries that have fully legalized the cultivation, consumption and bartering of recreational cannabis nationwide. In the United States, 24 states, 3 territories, and the District of Columbia have legalized the recreational use of cannabis – though the drug remains illegal at the federal level. Laws vary from state to state when it comes to the commercial sale. Court rulings in Georgia and South Africa have led to the legalization of cannabis consumption, but not legal sales. A policy of limited enforcement has also been adopted in many countries, in particular Spain and the Netherlands where the sale of cannabis is tolerated at licensed establishments. Contrary to popular belief, cannabis is not legal in the Netherlands, but it has been decriminalized since the 1970s. In 2021, Malta was the first European Union member to legalize the use of cannabis for recreational purposes. In Estonia, it is only legal to sell cannabis products with a THC content of less than 0.2%, although products may contain more cannabidiol. Lebanon has recently become the first Arab country to legalize the plantation of cannabis for medical use.

Penalties for illegal recreational use ranges from confiscation or small fines to jail time and even death. In some countries, citizens can be punished if they have used the drug in another country, including Singapore and South Korea.

=== Economics ===
==== Production ====
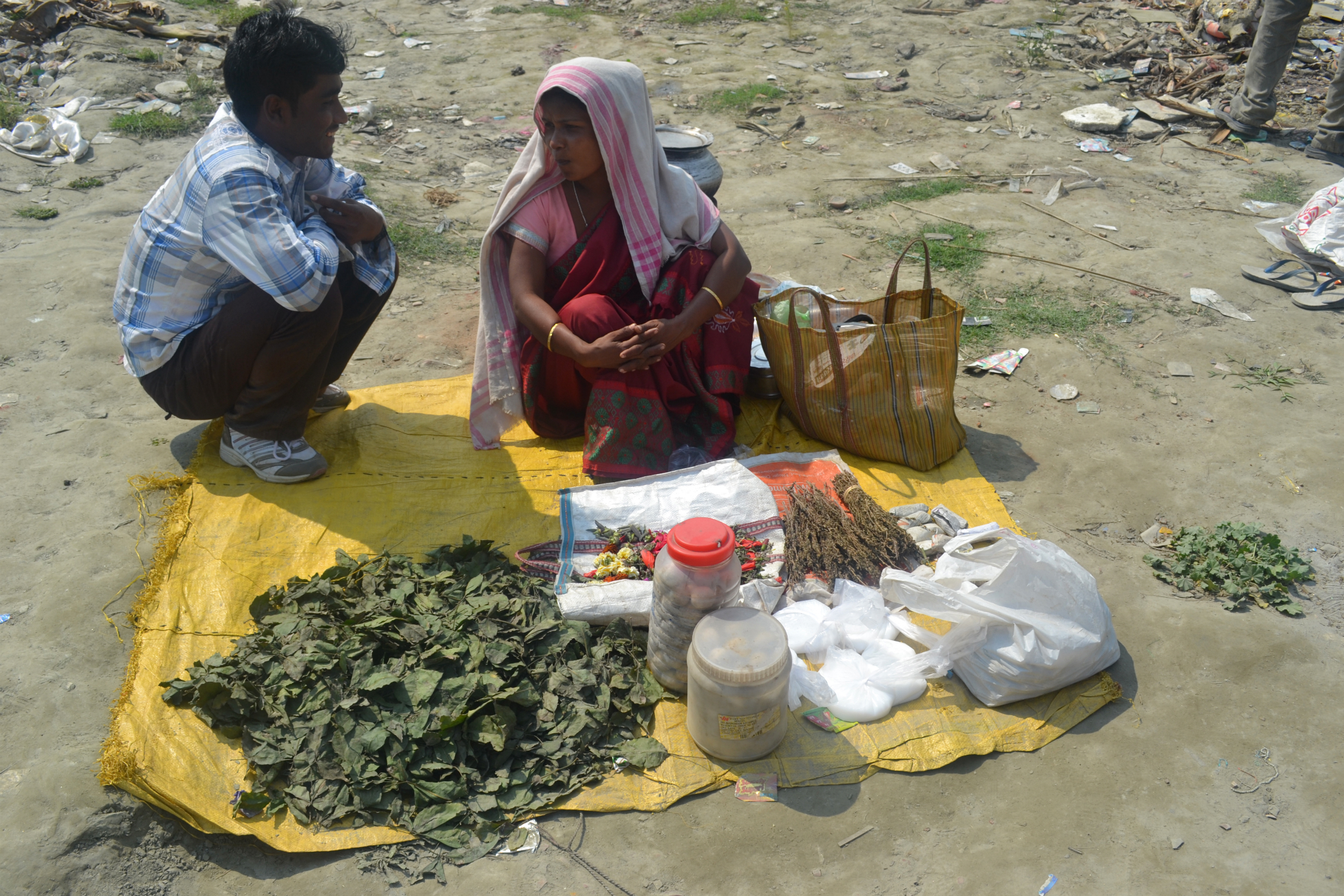
Woman selling cannabis and bhang in Guwahati, Assam, India

Sinsemilla (Spanish for "without seed") is the dried, seedless (i.e. parthenocarpic) infructescences of female cannabis plants. Because THC production drops off once pollination occurs, the male plants (which produce little THC themselves) are eliminated before they shed pollen to prevent pollination, thus inducing the development of parthenocarpic fruits gathered in dense infructescences. Advanced cultivation techniques such as hydroponics, cloning, high-intensity artificial lighting, and the sea of green method are frequently employed as a response (in part) to prohibition enforcement efforts that make outdoor cultivation more risky.

"Skunk" refers to several named strains of potent cannabis, grown through selective breeding and sometimes hydroponics. It is a cross-breed of Cannabis sativa and C. indica (although other strains of this mix exist in abundance). Skunk cannabis potency ranges usually from 6% to 15% and rarely as high as 20%. The average THC level in coffee shops in the Netherlands is about 18–19%.

The average levels of THC in cannabis sold in the United States rose dramatically between the 1970s and 2000. This is disputed for various reasons, and there is little consensus as to whether this is a fact or an artifact of poor testing methodologies. According to Daniel Forbes writing for slate.com, the relative strength of modern strains are likely skewed because undue weight is given to much more expensive and potent, but less prevalent, samples. Some suggest that results are skewed by older testing methods that included low-THC-content plant material such as leaves in the samples, which are excluded in contemporary tests. Others believe that modern strains actually are significantly more potent than older ones.

The main producing countries of cannabis are Afghanistan, Canada, China, Colombia, India, Jamaica, Lebanon, Mexico, Morocco, the Netherlands, Pakistan, Paraguay, Spain, Thailand, Turkey, the United Kingdom, and the United States.

==== Price ====
The price or street value of cannabis varies widely depending on geographic area and potency. Prices and overall markets have also varied considerably over time.

- In 1997, cannabis was estimated to be overall the number four value crop in the US, and number one or two in many states, including California, New York, and Florida. This estimate is based on a value to growers of ~60% of retail value, or $3,000 per pound ($6,600/kg).
- In 2006, cannabis was estimated to have been a $36 billion market. This estimate has been challenged as exaggerated. The UN World Drug Report (2008) estimated that 2006 street prices in the US and Canada ranged from about US$8.8 to $25 per gram (approximately $250 to $700 per ounce), depending on quality. Typical U.S. retail prices were $10–15 per gram (approximately $280–420 per ounce).
- In 2017, the U.S. was estimated to constitute 90% of the worldwide $9.5 billion legal trade in cannabis.

After some U.S. states legalized cannabis, street prices began to drop. In Colorado, the price of smokable buds (infructescences) dropped 40 percent between 2014 and 2019, from $200 per ounce to $120 per ounce ($7 per gram to $4.19 per gram).

The European Monitoring Centre for Drugs and Drug Addiction reports that typical retail prices in Europe for cannabis varied from €2 to €20 per gram in 2008, with a majority of European countries reporting prices in the range €4–10.

== Cannabis as a gateway drug ==
The gateway hypothesis states that cannabis use increases the probability of trying "harder" drugs. The hypothesis has been hotly debated as it is regarded by some as the primary rationale for the United States prohibition on cannabis use. A Pew Research Center poll found that political opposition to marijuana use was significantly associated with concerns about the health effects and whether legalization would increase cannabis use by children.

Some studies state that while there is no proof for the gateway hypothesis, young cannabis users should still be considered as a risk group for intervention programs. Other findings indicate that hard drug users are likely to be poly-drug users, and that interventions must address the use of multiple drugs instead of a single hard drug. Almost two-thirds of the poly drug users in the 2009–2010 Scottish Crime and Justice Survey used cannabis.

The gateway effect may appear due to social factors involved in using any illegal drug. Because of the illegal status of cannabis, its consumers are likely to find themselves in situations allowing them to acquaint with individuals using or selling other illegal drugs. Studies have shown that alcohol and tobacco may additionally be regarded as gateway drugs; however, a more parsimonious explanation could be that cannabis is simply more readily available (and at an earlier age) than illegal hard drugs. In turn, alcohol and tobacco are typically easier to obtain at an earlier age than is cannabis (though the reverse may be true in some areas), thus leading to the "gateway sequence" in those individuals, since they are most likely to experiment with any drug offered.

A related alternative to the gateway hypothesis is the common liability to addiction (CLA) theory. It states that some individuals are, for various reasons, willing to try multiple recreational substances. The "gateway" drugs are merely those that are (usually) available at an earlier age than the harder drugs. Researchers have noted in an extensive review that it is dangerous to present the sequence of events described in gateway "theory" in causative terms as this hinders both research and intervention.

In 2020, the National Institute on Drug Abuse released a study backing allegations that marijuana is a gateway to harder drugs, though not for the majority of marijuana users. The National Institute on Drug Abuse determined that marijuana use is "likely to precede use of other licit and illicit substances" and that "adults who reported marijuana use during the first wave of the survey were more likely than adults who did not use marijuana to develop an alcohol use disorder within 3 years; people who used marijuana and already had an alcohol use disorder at the outset were at greater risk of their alcohol use disorder worsening. Marijuana use is also linked to other substance use disorders including nicotine addiction." It also reported that "These findings are consistent with the idea of marijuana as a "gateway drug". However, the majority of people who use marijuana do not go on to use other, "harder" substances. Also, cross-sensitization is not unique to marijuana. Alcohol and nicotine also prime the brain for a heightened response to other drugs and are, like marijuana, also typically used before a person progresses to other, more harmful substances."

== Research ==
Research on cannabis is challenging since the plant is illegal in most countries. Research-grade samples of the drug are difficult to obtain for research purposes, unless granted under authority of national regulatory agencies, such as the US Food and Drug Administration.

There are also other difficulties in researching the effects of cannabis. Many people who smoke cannabis also smoke tobacco. This causes confounding factors, where questions arise as to whether the tobacco, the cannabis, or both that have caused a cancer. Another difficulty researchers have is in recruiting people who smoke cannabis into studies. Because cannabis is an illegal drug in many countries, people may be reluctant to take part in research, and if they do agree to take part, they may not be honest about how much cannabis they actually smoke.

== See also ==
- Cannabis rights
- Cannabis culture
- Glossary of cannabis terms
- List of books about cannabis
- List of celebrities who own cannabis businesses
