= Cannabis in Zambia =

Cannabis in Zambia is illegal for recreational use. In December 2019, by unanimous decision, it was legalized for export and medicinal purposes only. Cannabis is known as Zam-Blaze, chamba, chwang, or dobo in Zambia.

In March 2017 Home Affairs Minister Steven Kampyongo clarified that it is legal to cultivate cannabis for medical use if a license is obtained from the Minister of Health. In May 2017, however, Health Minister Dr. Chitalu Chilufya stated that he has no intention of issuing any cultivation licenses.
