= Wechsler Scales =

Wechsler Scales may refer to:

- Wechsler Adult Intelligence Scale
- Wechsler Individual Achievement Test
- Wechsler Intelligence Scale for Children
- Wechsler Memory Scale
- Wechsler Preschool and Primary Scale of Intelligence
- Wechsler Test of Adult Reading
