= List of cannabis hoaxes =

Cannabis has been the subject of many hoaxes, urban legends and fake news.

- Cannabis causes psychosis – no medical evidence has shown causation.
- Monsanto GMO cannabis hoax – Purports that Monsanto has created genetically modified cannabis. Debunked by multiple sources including Monsanto with "standing denial" on "Myths About Monsanto" webpage.
- Rick Simpson Oil cures skin cancer – no medical evidence has shown causation.
- International Space Station cannabis experiment hoax – shows an image of astronaut Chris Hadfield holding a baggie of cannabis on the International Space Station
- NASA marijuana experiments hoax – Purports that NASA has paid volunteers to smoke cannabis and lie in bed. NASA has never done the former, but has done the latter.
- Planet X637Z-43 – A 2015 internet hoax purported to document the discovery by NASA of a planet covered in cannabis. Supposedly it was one of 715 planets discovered by the Kepler space telescope in 2014. The story originated on a fake news website, NewsWatch28 (also reported as 28 News Watch).
- Thomas Jefferson hemp smoking hoax – Purports that President Thomas Jefferson wrote about smoking hemp on his porch. He did not.
- Hemp Levi's jeans urban legend – Purports that the first pair of Levi's jeans was made out of hemp. They were actually cotton canvas.
- U.S. Constitution hemp paper hoax – Purports that the United States Constitution was written on hemp paper. In fact, the Constitution and the Declaration of Independence were written on parchment. "The point of debate is that some working drafts of the documents might have been composed on paper made from hemp, which was widely used in that time period." But paper was typically made from mixed recycled fibers from old textiles, which included hemp but also linen, and cotton among other materials, rather than from a single plant source. The concept of "hemp paper" itself is therefore a very recent one.
- Pot brownies food stamps hoax – Purports that Supplemental Nutrition Assistance Program EBT card (food stamps) can be used to buy pot brownies.
- No deaths attributed to cannabis – listed by California NORML as myth, due to elevated accident rates among users.
- Marlboro M hoax – Purports that American Marlboro cigarettes containing cannabis have been produced in green labeled packages. The images of the packaging were created for fake news website Abril Uno (April one, i.e. April Fool's) in January, 2014 and covered by other fake news websites like Now 8 News.
- The Nizari Ismaili were a Shia Muslim sect, founded in the 1080s, who earned a reputation as ruthless killers. They were known as hashishi, hashishiyya, or hashishiyyin (from the Arabic al-hasziszijjin, "hash-eaters"), whence the English word 'assassin' is derived. Westerners believed that consuming the drug put them into a murderous trance. No Islamic sources describe the Ismaili as consuming hash, and since the 20th century, historians have been of the opinion that the Ismaili were in reality never believed by their contemporaries to consume hash - instead, it was used as a term of abuse. The myth or legend was repeated by Federal Bureau of Narcotics chief Harry Anslinger during his 1930s anti-cannabis campaigns.
- McDonald's marijuana lounges – One of several McDonald's urban legends purports that the company's restaurants in Colorado are converting children's playgrounds to lounges for on-premises cannabis consumption. Circulated via Internet fake news sites since 2015, and has been disavowed by a McDonald's spokesperson.
- Amtrak smoking cars – In 2022, a satirical Buffalo Chronicle story about Amtrak selling cannabis onboard U.S. trains, and allowing consumption in designated smoking cars, at the urging of Senate Majority Leader Chuck Schumer, a proponent of cannabis legalization, was reprinted in its entirety in Railway Age along with commentary. The story had Schumer saying the regulation "will improve the passenger experience and increase ticket sales".
- Carrier pigeon cannabis delivery hoax – 2025 media plant to promote a New York dispensary
