= Thomas Jefferson hemp smoking hoax =

The Thomas Jefferson hemp smoking hoax concerns a quote misattributed to U.S. President Thomas Jefferson:

Some of my finest hours have been spent on my back veranda, smoking hemp and observing as far as my eye can see.

Although he may have raised hemp, according to reliable sources, Jefferson was not the source of the phrase, which is in fact a modern invention. It reportedly appeared as an Internet hoax in 2008 and was first printed in 2013, and has been described by American University School of Communication professor W. Joseph Campbell in Getting It Wrong: Debunking the Greatest Myths in American Journalism as "fake news" predating Facebook. According to Campbell, pro-legalization U.S. presidential candidate Gary Johnson repeated the quote during a 2012 television interview. The quote has also been attributed to Jefferson in print newspapers, such as Detroit Free Press and newspapers in British Columbia and India, and Internet image macros featuring the quote.

== See also ==
- List of United States politicians who have acknowledged cannabis use
