= Owen Shroyer =

American media personality (born 1989)

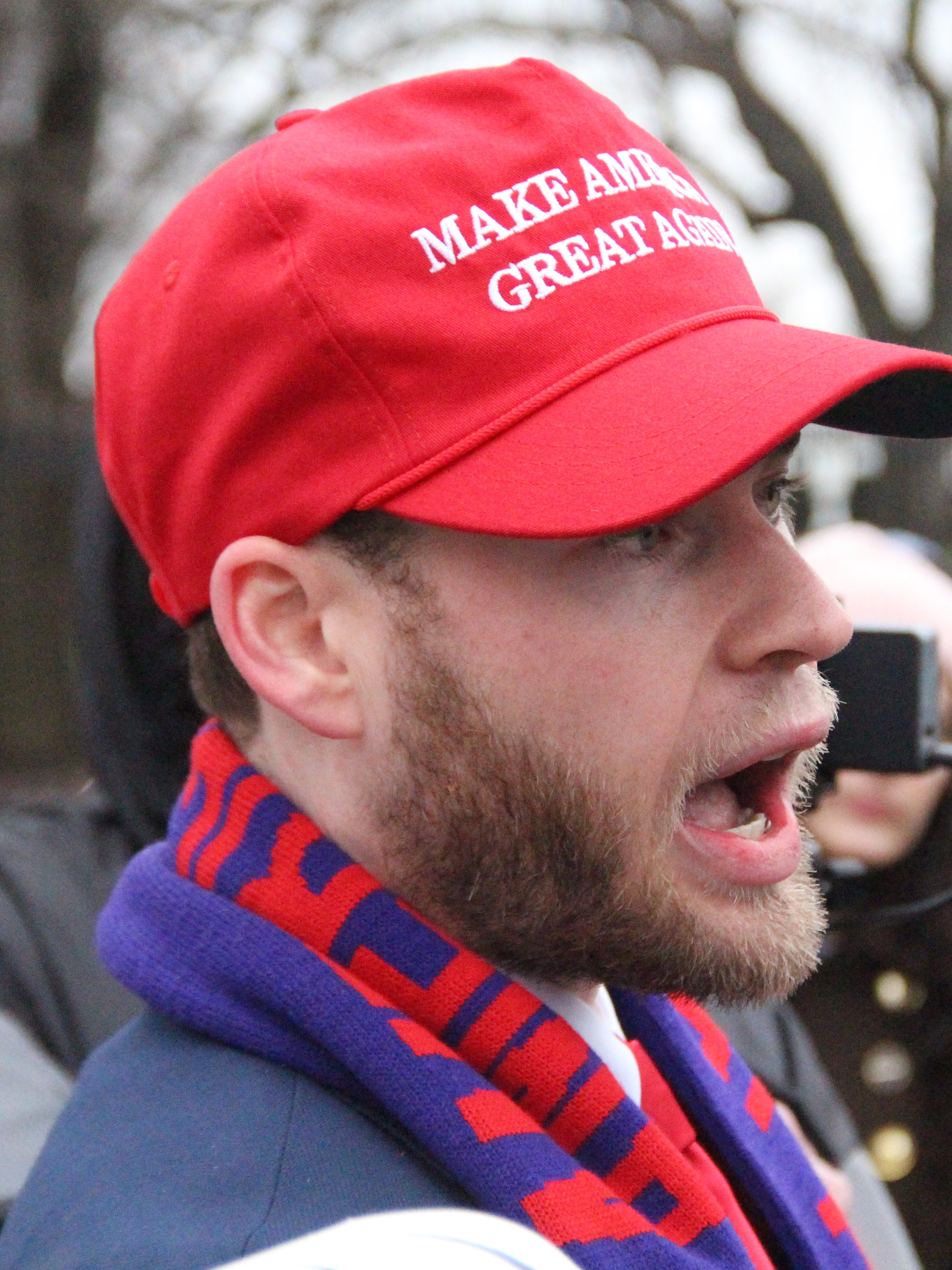
- Shroyer in 2019
- Born: June 28, 1989 (age 37); St. Louis, Missouri, U.S.
- Occupation: Media presenter
- Employers: KXFN; KFNS (AM); Infowars

Jonathon Owen Shroyer (born June 28, 1989) is an American media presenter who hosted the War Room show on the far-right website Infowars from 2016 to 2025. Prior to working for Infowars, Shroyer hosted shows for KXFN and KFNS radio stations. In September 2025 Shroyer left Infowars over disagreement on the direction of the network. Shortly after, he began hosting an independent show called the Owen Report.

== Early life ==
Owen Shroyer was born in St. Louis in 1989 to mother Annette Shroyer.

== Career ==
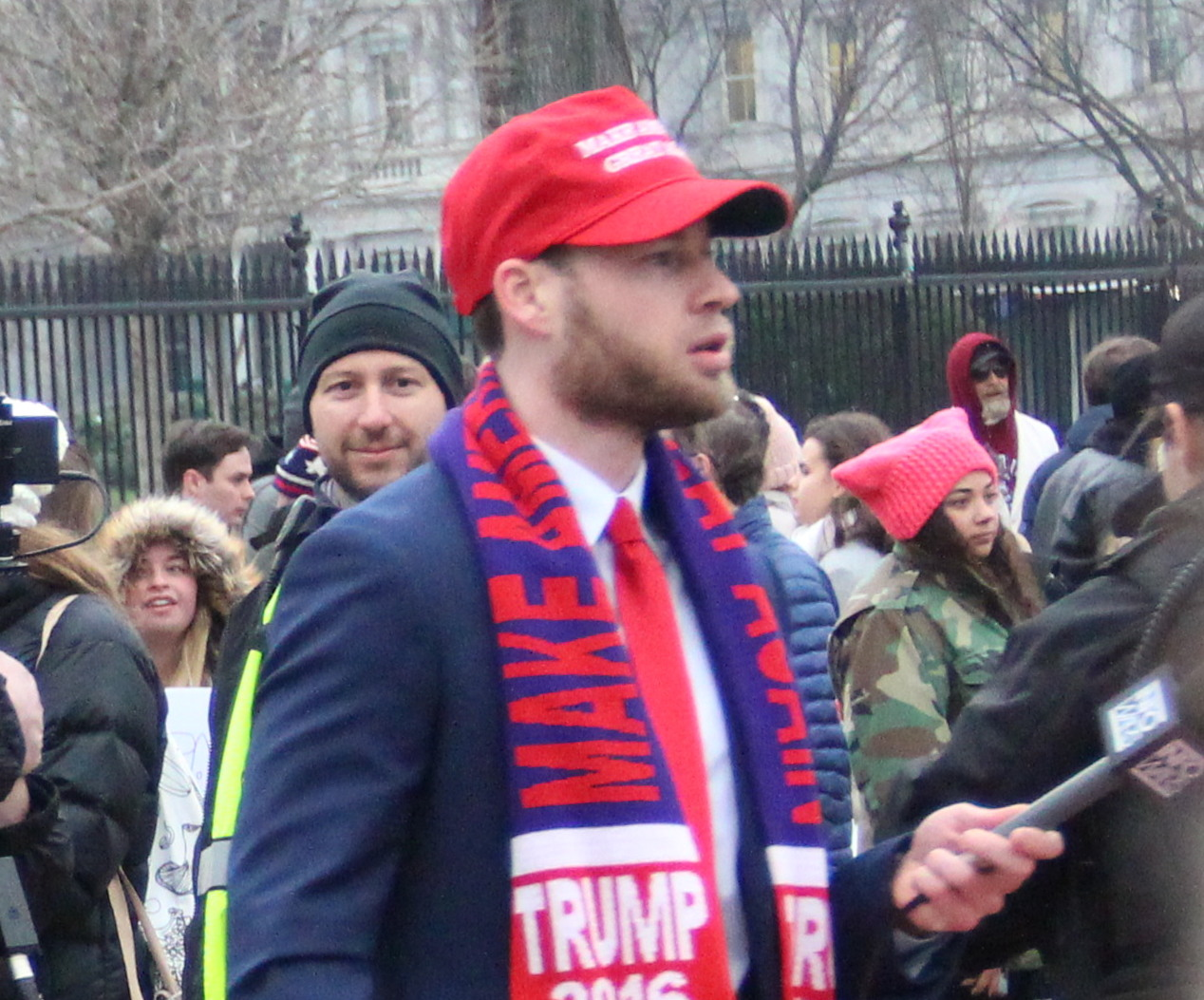
Shroyer at the 2019 Women's March

Shroyer worked as radio host for KXFN and KFNS. From 2016 to 2025, he has worked for Infowars as both a host and a video editor. He presented the platform's War Room show.

In 2018, Shroyer was named in a lawsuit filed in Texas against Infowars and its owner, Alex Jones, by the parents of children who were killed in the Sandy Hook Elementary School shooting, including Neil Heslin. Shroyer personally claimed on air in June 2017 that it was impossible that Neil Heslin, father of Sandy Hook victim Jesse Lewis, could have held his son's body after the incident and suggested in further comments that Heslin was lying about his son's death. These defamatory claims, combined with others made by Alex Jones, resulted in Infowars being found liable for damages. On August 4, 2022, a Texas jury awarded the Sandy Hook plaintiffs $4.1 million in compensatory damages and an additional $45.2 million in punitive damages.

In January 2022, Shroyer falsely claimed that Canadian prime minister Justin Trudeau signed a $1 million non-disclosure agreement with a minor who had allegedly accused him of sexual misconduct, citing articles from the Buffalo Chronicle, a fake news website.

In June 2023, Shroyer pleaded guilty to illegally entering a restricted area near the United States Capitol building during the January 6 attack. He was arrested and charged in August 2021. On September 12, 2023, he was sentenced to 60 days in jail. On January 20, 2025, the first day of the second presidency of Donald Trump, Shroyer was pardoned along with nearly every other participant in the Capitol attack.

Prior to his guilty plea, Shroyer agreed to defer his prosecution for interrupting a congressional hearing. In 2019, he interrupted a Congress impeachment hearing to share his views that Donald Trump was innocent and that "Jerry Nadler and the Democrat Party are committing treason in this country!"

On September 1, 2025, Shroyer announced he would be leaving Infowars due to disagreements with Jones over the direction of the network. He also announced that he planned to begin his own network in the near future.

On December 17, 2025, Trump gave a speech and Shroyer commented: "His base has turned. He knows it. Ego damaged. Swagger lost. ... No, the U.S. economy is not doing great. You can’t lie your way through that."

Shroyer lives in Austin, Texas. He hosts an independent show called the Owen Report and has branched out into selling various merchandise including an energy supplement called "Crashout Energy" which has reportedly been a success.

== See also ==
- List of cases of the January 6 United States Capitol attack (M-S)
- Criminal proceedings in the January 6 United States Capitol attack
- List of people granted executive clemency in the second Trump presidency
