= List of British politicians who have acknowledged cannabis use =

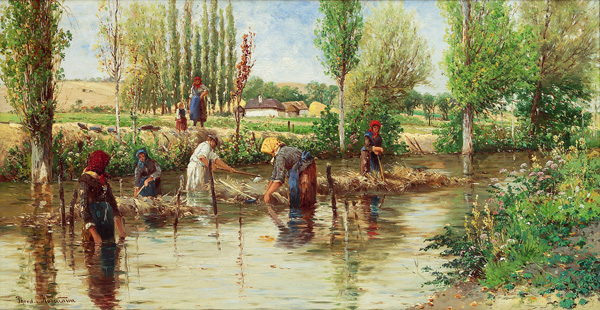
The retting of raw hemp in a stream

Cannabis is a genus of flowering plants with species that have long been used for fibre (hemp), for medicinal purposes, and as a drug. Industrial hemp products are made from cannabis plants selected to produce an abundance of fiber and minimal levels of tetrahydrocannabinol (THC), a psychoactive molecule that produces the "high" associated with cannabis as a drug.

== Pre-prohibition ==
Cannabis may have been known in Britain as far back as the Bronze Age (ca. 2800 BP) when pieces of textiles and string were found at a site at St. Andrews in Scotland. Microscopic inspection showed that the fibres of these items appeared to have several different characteristics to those of flax.

The first hard evidence of hemp in England are seeds that have been identified as cannabis sativa found in a Roman well in York. Palynologists then find an increasing pollen curve in sediments, dating from the early Saxon period and peaking between 800 AD and 1200 AD. Hemp cultivation was widespread and appears to have been concentrated around the coastal areas of Britain which would indicate its importance for making nets, sail-cloth and rope.

However, to satisfy the increased demand for rope and sailcloth for King Henry VIII's new navy, he decreed (1533) that all landholders set aside one-quarter acre for the cultivation of flax or hemp for every sixty acres of land that they tilled in order to provide the necessary fibre. Queen Elizabeth I reintroduced the law (1563 AD) to expand her navy and imposes a £5 fine for any eligible landlord who failed to comply. From then on the demand increased and the hemp industry became very important to the British economy. Indeed, it was their need to improve the supply of this strategic raw commodity that come the 1630s the British sped up their colonization of the new world.

Furthermore, cannabis also became an important medicine. There are claims that Queen Victoria took tincture of Cannabis to ease the pain of childbirth but these have been disputed.

Name	Lifetime	Notable positions held	Party	Ref.
David Urquhart	1805–1877	Member of Parliament	Independent	

Parties

Independent

== Legislation ==
In order that Britain could ratify international treaties which it signed up to, it added tincture of cannabis to the list of drugs which already required an importation or exportation licence, granted by the Home Secretary. This took the form of the Dangerous Drugs Act 1920 (10 & 11 Geo. 5. c. 46).

Secondary legislation was introduced to ensure better standardization and quality of cannabis tincture. This was achieved by tight legislative control over sourcing the raw materials, processing and distribution. An effect of this control was to restrict the use of tincture to purposes that were strictly medical or scientific. Other forms of cannabis were not affected.

One of the regulations to maintain quality is briefly alluded to by Maud Grieve in her book A Modern Herbal, where she mentions in the section about Indian Hemp that "two-year-old ganja is almost inert, and the law requires it to be burnt in the presence of excise officers."

The League of Nations was put in charge of international drug control after World War One. Cannabis was not initially subject to international control but was controlled as part of the Second International Opium Convention of 1925. Control came about due to the local situation in Egypt and the desire of the new leaders of the country to embarrass their former British rulers by claiming that its use had led to widespread insanity. Due to its importance as a medicine and its other industrial uses, this proposal was reduced to prohibiting the unlicensed possession of cannabis. Britain ratified this agreement by amending the Dangerous Drugs Act 1920 with the Dangerous Drugs Act 1925 (15 & 16 Geo. 5. c. 74) which added some other of cannabis hitherto ignored. Namely, cannabis resin, cannabis oil (hash oil), cannabis leaf, flower-heads and the raw plant itself. However, whole seeds, seed oil (hemp oil) and fibre are not included. They can still be used for baiting fish, feeding birds, cooking, making strong ropes and high quality paper. In order that the government could avoid paying out compensation, enforcement of the act was delayed until 1928, thus giving people time to legitimately dispose of their stock which contravenes the new Bill.

Following the Single Convention on Narcotic Drugs (1961) the cultivation of cannabis ceased in the UK.

Cannabis tincture was finally removed from the British National Formulary in 1971 by the Misuse of Drugs Act 1971.

== During prohibition ==
These are the politicians that have admitted to recreational use following prohibition including Members of Parliament, Secretaries of State and other Ministers, Peers, and Mayors as well as members of devolved legislatures.

Key
Conservative Labour SNP Liberal Democrats Plaid Cymru

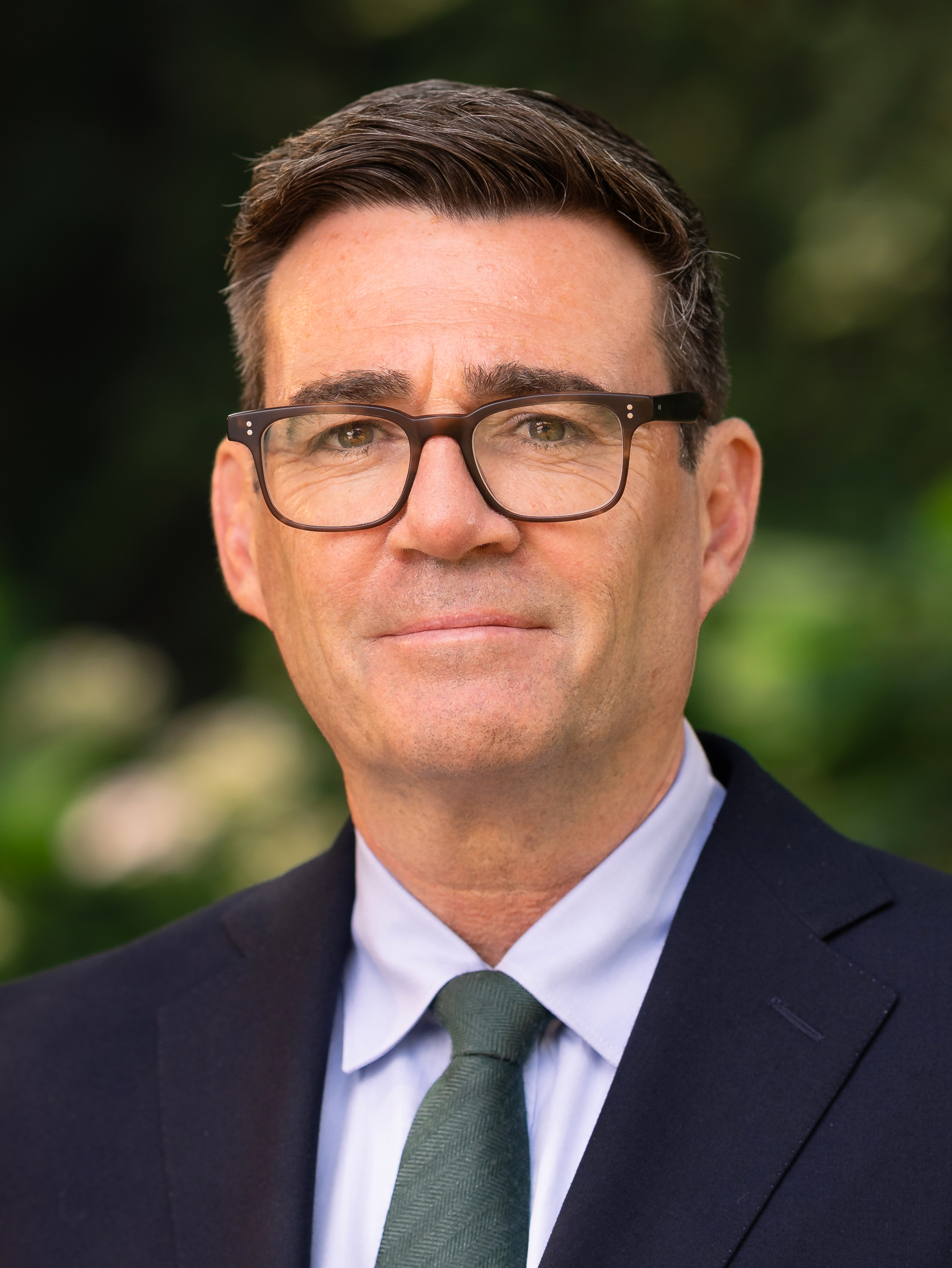
Andy Burnham, Prime Minister of the United Kingdom

David Cameron, former Prime Minister of the United Kingdom

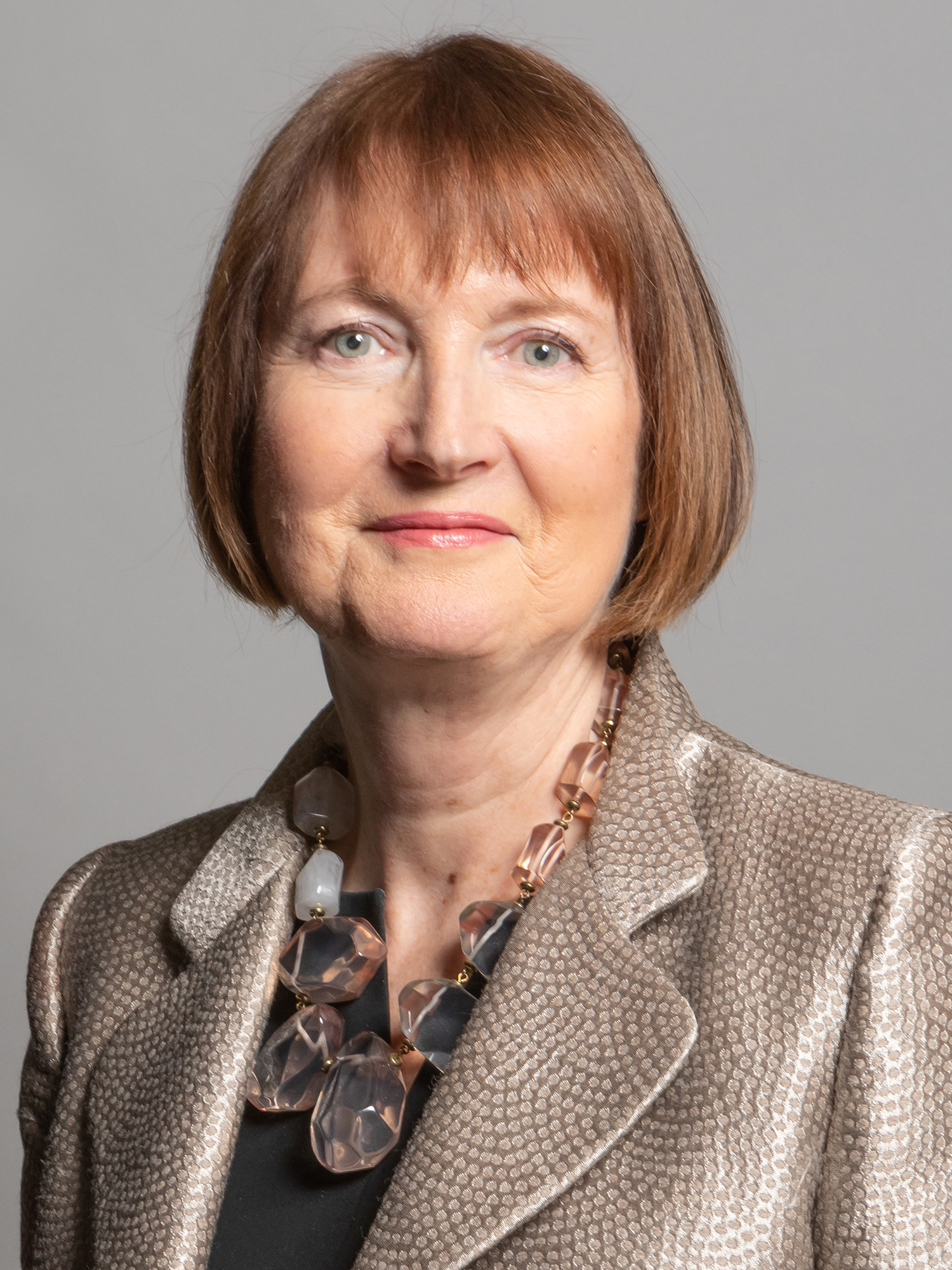
Harriet Harman, former Deputy Leader of the Labour Party

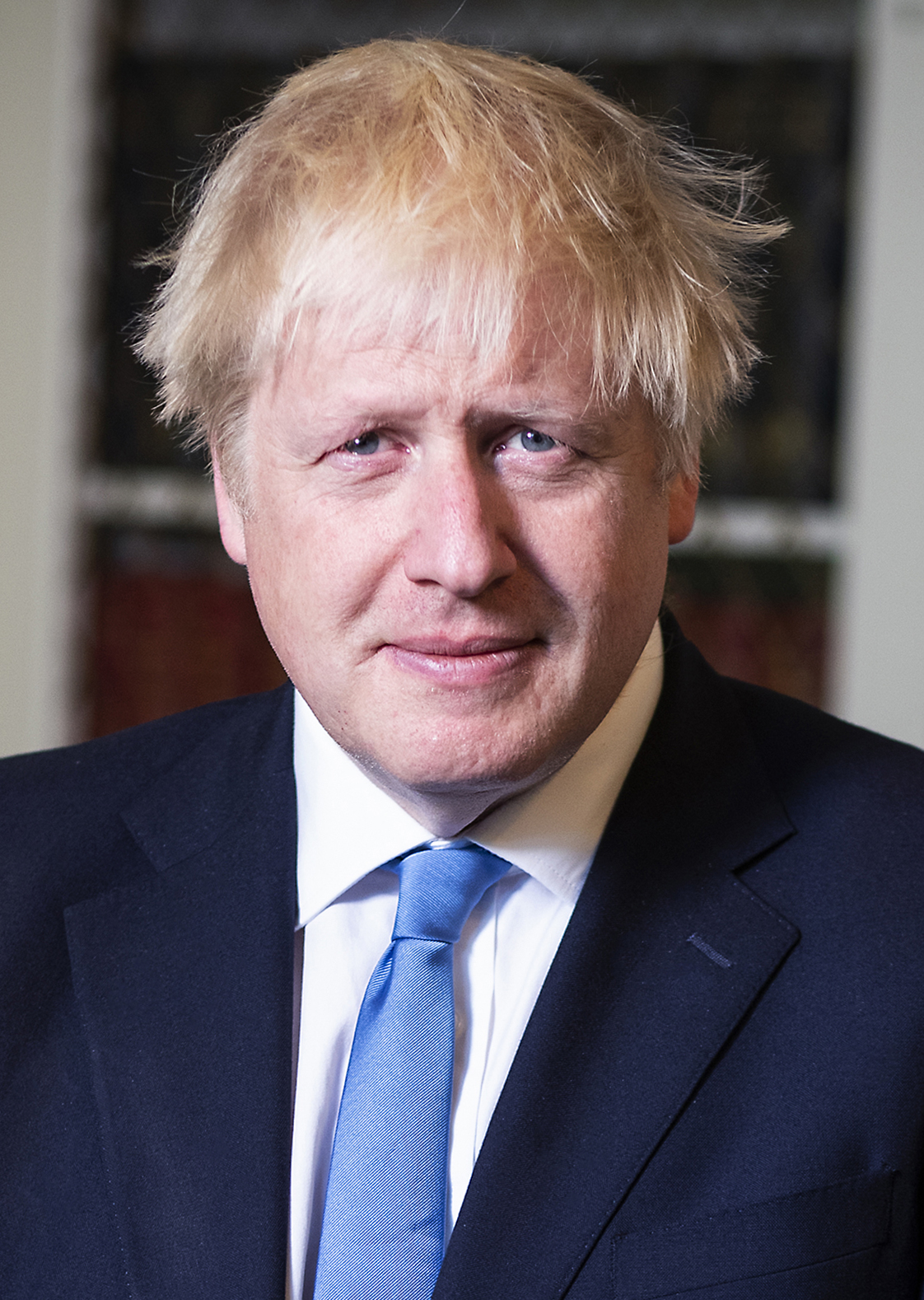
Boris Johnson, former Prime Minister of the United Kingdom and former Mayor of London

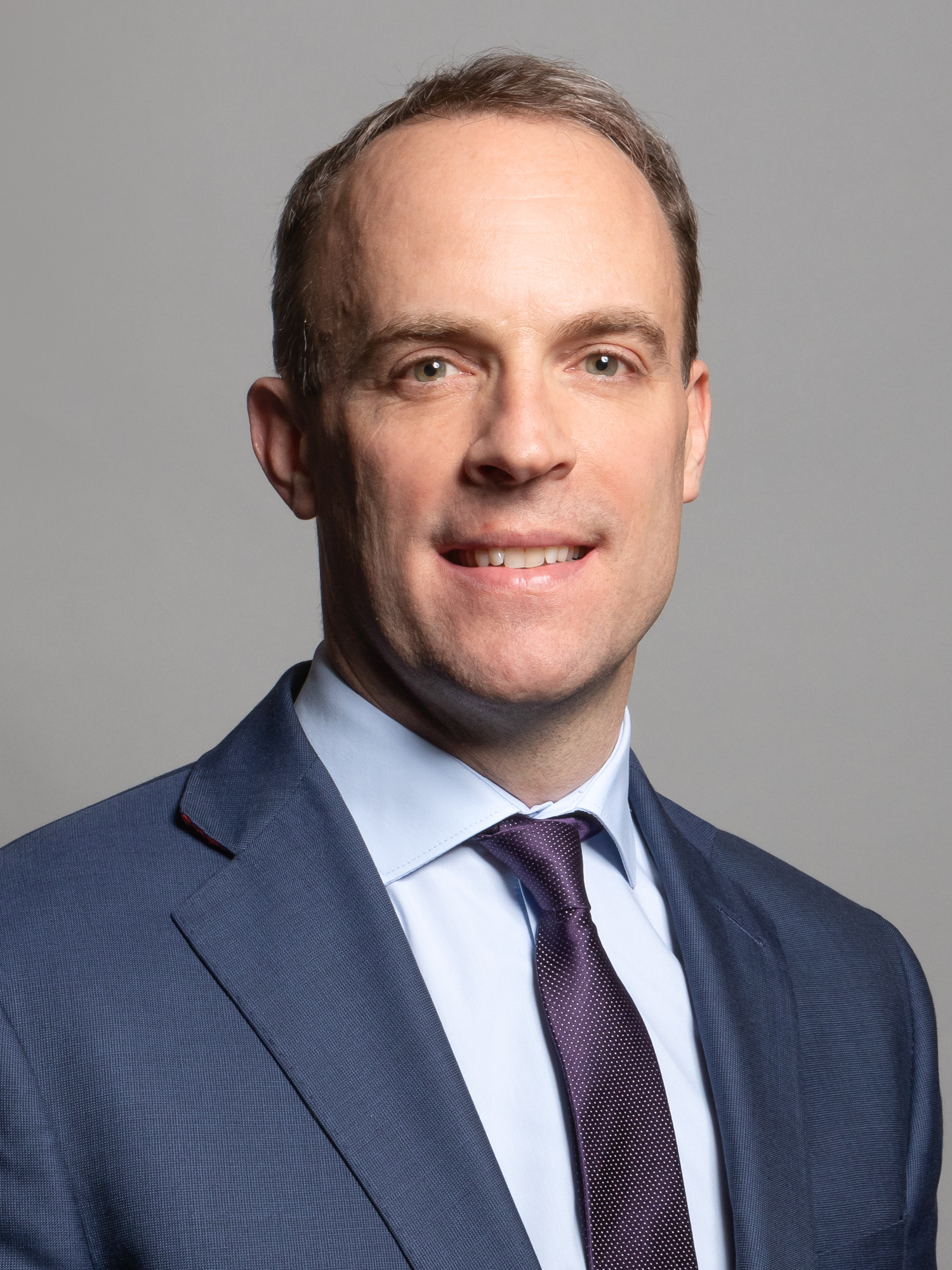
Dominic Raab, former Deputy Prime Minister

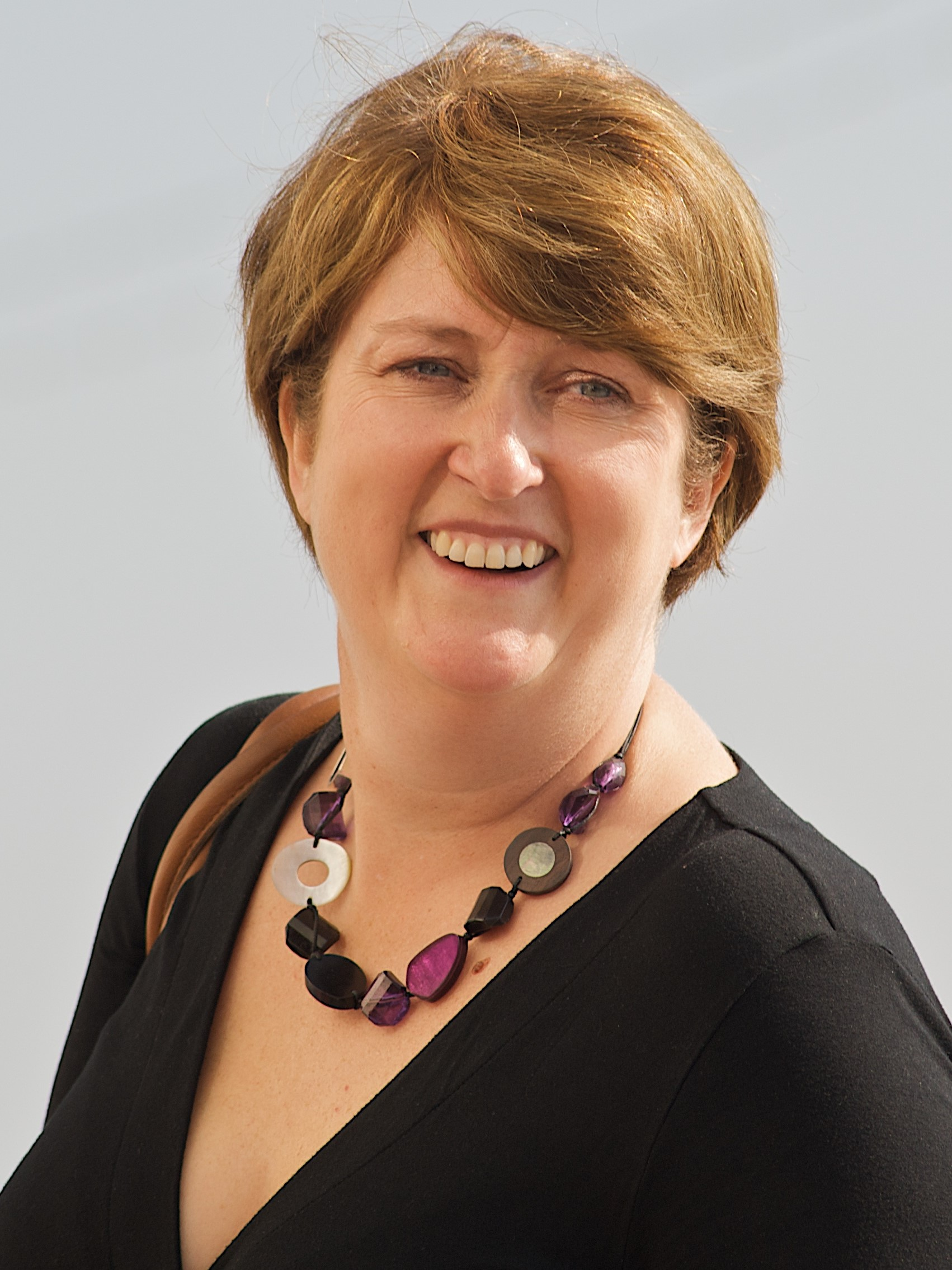
Jacqui Smith, former Home Secretary

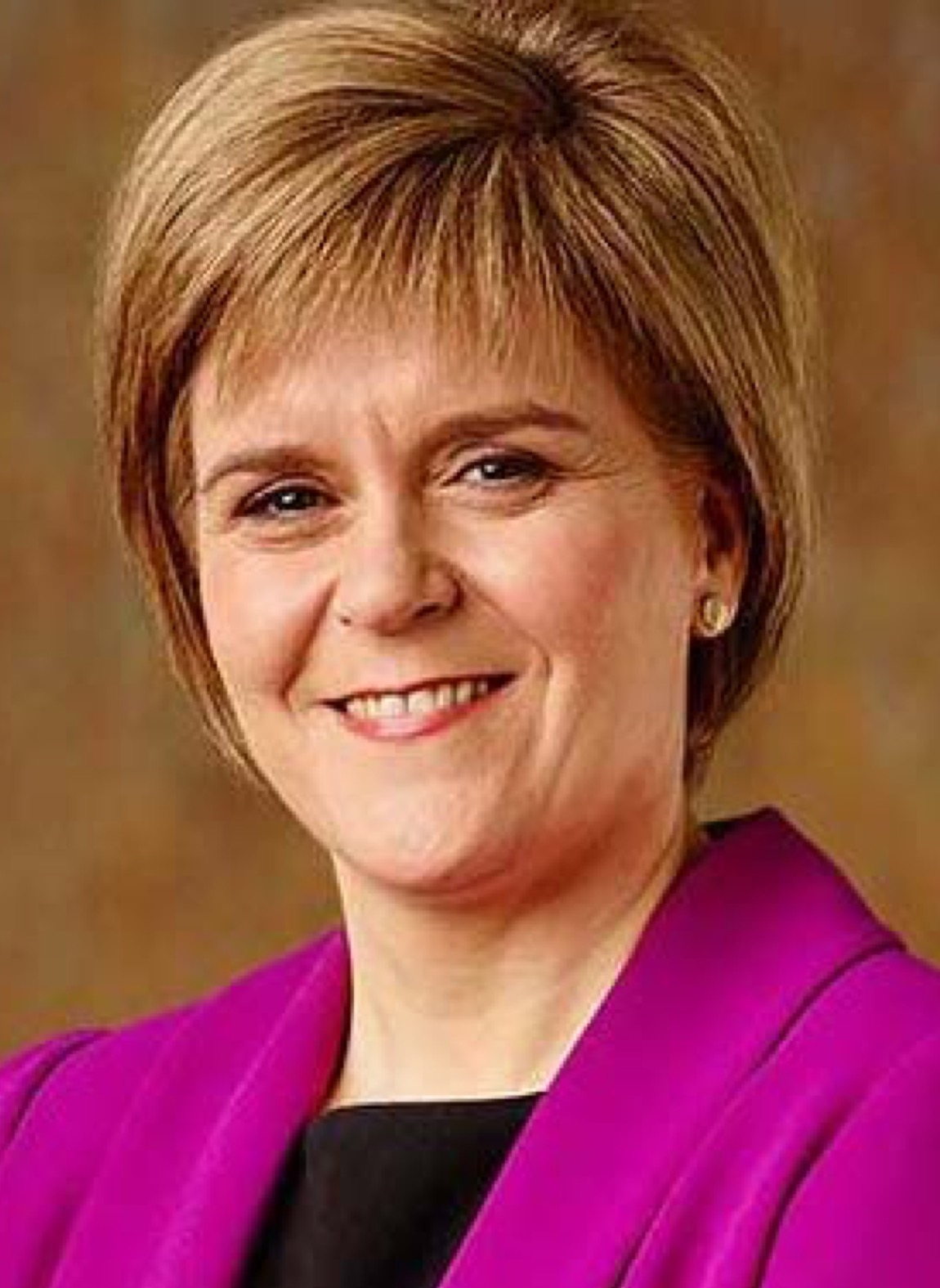
Nicola Sturgeon, former First Minister of Scotland

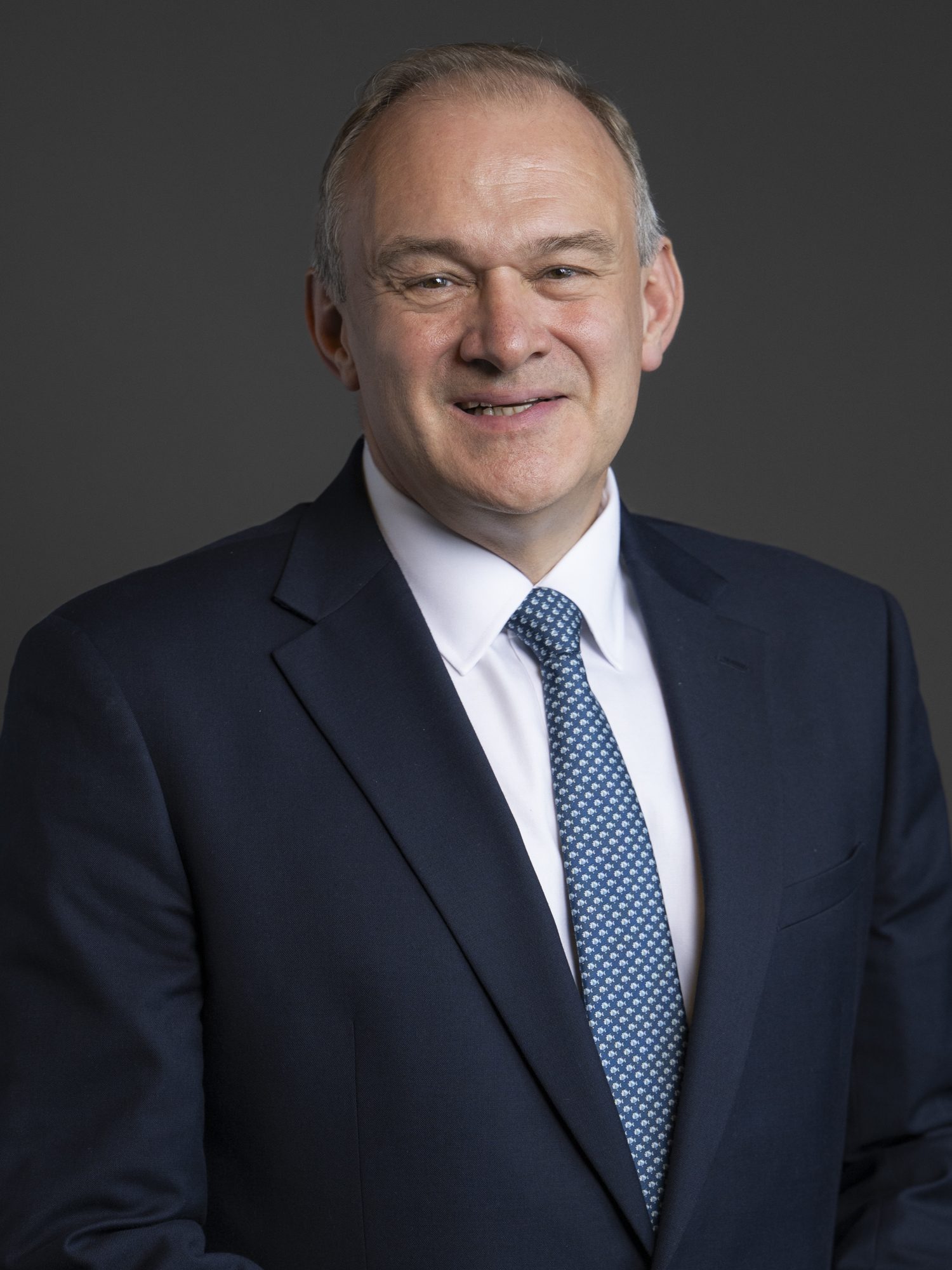
Ed Davey, Leader of the Liberal Democrats

Name	Lifetime	Notable positions held	Party	Ref.
Peter Ainsworth	1956–2021	Shadow Secretary of State	Conservative	
Hazel Blears	b. 1956	Secretary of State for Communities and Local Government	Labour	
Andy Burnham	b. 1970	Secretary of State for Health; Secretary of State for Culture, Media and Sport; Mayor of Greater Manchester; Leader of the Labour Party; Prime Minister of the United Kingdom	Labour	
David Cameron	b. 1966	Foreign Secretary from 2023 to 2024; Prime Minister of the United Kingdom from 2010 to 2016; Leader of the Opposition from 2005 to 2010; Leader of the Conservative Party from 2005 to 2016	Conservative	
Charles Clarke	b. 1950	Home Secretary	Labour	
James Cleverly	b. 1969	Home Secretary; Foreign Secretary; Secretary of State for Education; Co-Chairman of the Conservative Party; Parliamentary Under-Secretary of State for Exiting the European Union	Conservative	
Vernon Coaker	b. 1953	Minister of State for Schools	Labour	
Yvette Cooper	b. 1969	Secretary of State for Work and Pensions; Chief Secretary to the Treasury; Chair of the Home Affairs Select Committee	Labour	
Bruce Crawford	b. 1955	Cabinet Secretary for Parliamentary Business and Government Strategy	SNP	
Alistair Darling, Baron Darling of Roulanish	1953–2023	Chancellor of the Exchequer	Labour	
Ed Davey	b. 1965	Leader of the Liberal Democrats	Liberal Democrat	
Ruth Davidson	b. 1978	Leader of the Scottish Conservative Party	Conservative	
Fergus Ewing	b. 1957	Cabinet Secretary for the Rural Economy and Connectivity	SNP	
Michael Fabricant	b. 1950	Lord Commissioner of the Treasury; Member of Parliament	Conservative	
Caroline Flint	b. 1961	Minister of State for Europe	Labour	
Thomas Galbraith, 2nd Baron Strathclyde	b. 1960	Leader of the House of Lords; Chancellor of the Duchy of Lancaster	Conservative	
Michael Gove	b. 1967	Secretary of State for Housing, Communities and Local Government; Secretary of State for Environment, Food and Rural Affairs; Secretary of State for Education	Conservative	
Matt Hancock	b. 1978	Secretary of State for Health and Social Care; Secretary of State for Digital, Culture, Media and Sport	Conservative	
Harriet Harman	b. 1950	Leader of the House of Commons	Labour	
Patricia Hewitt	b. 1948	Secretary of State for Health; Secretary of State for Business, Innovation and Skills	Labour	
Jeremy Hunt	b. 1966	Secretary of State for Foreign and Commonwealth Affairs; Secretary of State for Health and Social Care	Conservative	
John Hutton, Baron Hutton of Furness	b. 1955	Secretary of State for Defence	Labour	
Fiona Hyslop	b. 1964	Cabinet Secretary for Culture, Tourism and External Affairs; Cabinet Secretary for Education and Lifelong Learning	SNP	
Bernard Jenkin	b. 1959	Shadow Secretary of State for Defence	Conservative	
Boris Johnson	b. 1964	Prime Minister of the United Kingdom from 2019 to 2022; Foreign Secretary from 2016 to 2018; Mayor of London from 2008 to 2016	Conservative	
Jon Owen Jones	b. 1954	Parliamentary Under-Secretary of the Welsh Office	Labour	
Ruth Kelly	b. 1968	Secretary of State for Transport; Secretary of State for Communities and Local Government; Secretary of State for Education and Skills	Labour	
Liz Kendall	b. 1971	Shadow Minister for Care and Older People	Labour	
Sadiq Khan	b. 1970	Mayor of London; Member of Parliament; Minister of State for Transport; Shadow Secretary of State for Justice; Shadow Lord Chancellor	Labour	
Stephen Kinnock	b. 1970	Minister of State for Care; Secretary of State for Wales	Labour	
Susan Kramer, Baroness Kramer	b. 1950	Minister of State for Transport	Liberal Democrat	
David Lammy	b. 1972	Deputy Prime Minister of the United Kingdom; Foreign Secretary	Labour	
Norman Lamont, Baron Lamont of Lerwick	b. 1942	Chancellor of the Exchequer	Conservative	
Andrea Leadsom	b. 1963	Leader of the House of Commons; Lord President of the Council; Secretary of State for Environment, Food and Rural Affairs	Conservative	
Oliver Letwin	b. 1956	Chancellor of the Duchy of Lancaster; Shadow Home Secretary	Conservative	
Tricia Marwick	b. 1953	Presiding Officer of the Scottish Parliament	SNP	
Francis Maude, Baron Maude of Horsham	b. 1953	Minister for the Cabinet Office; Minister of State for Trade and Investment	Conservative	
Stewart Maxwell	b. 1963	Minister for Communities and Sport	SNP	
Tony McNulty	b. 1958	Minister of State for Employment and Welfare Reform	Labour	
Esther McVey	b. 1967	Ministry of Housing, Communities and Local Government; Secretary of State for Work and Pensions	Conservative	
Mo Mowlam	1949–2005	Leader of the House of Lords; Chancellor of the Duchy of Lancaster; Secretary of State for Northern Ireland	Labour	
Archie Norman	b. 1954	Shadow Secretary of State for the Environment, Transport and the Regions	Conservative	
Adam Price	b. 1968	Leader of Plaid Cymru	Plaid Cymru	
Dominic Raab	b. 1974	Deputy Prime Minister; First Secretary of State; Foreign Secretary; Secretary of State for Exiting the European Union	Conservative	
Steve Reed	b. 1963	Secretary of State for Environment, Food and Rural Affairs; Secretary of State for Housing, Communities and Local Government	Labour	
Shona Robison	b. 1966	Cabinet Secretary for Health and Sport	SNP	
Jacqui Smith	b. 1962	Home Secretary	Labour	
Nicola Sturgeon	b. 1970	First Minister of Scotland	SNP	
Jo Swinson	b. 1980	Leader of the Liberal Democrats	Liberal Democrat	
Matthew Taylor, Baron Taylor of Goss Moor	b. 1963	Liberal Democrats Treasury Spokesman	Liberal Democrat	
Chuka Umunna	b. 1978	Shadow Secretary of State for Business, Innovation and Skills	Liberal Democrat	
David Willetts, Baron Willetts	b. 1956	Minister of State for Universities and Science	Conservative	
Leanne Wood	b. 1971	Member of the National Assembly for Wales	Plaid Cymru	
Tim Yeo	b. 1945	Shadow Secretary of State	Conservative	

== See also ==
- Cannabis classification in the United Kingdom
- Cannabis in the United Kingdom
- List of United States politicians who have acknowledged cannabis use
