= International Space Station cannabis experiment hoax =

Internet hoax

The hoax image showing Chris Hadfield holding cannabis in a bag...

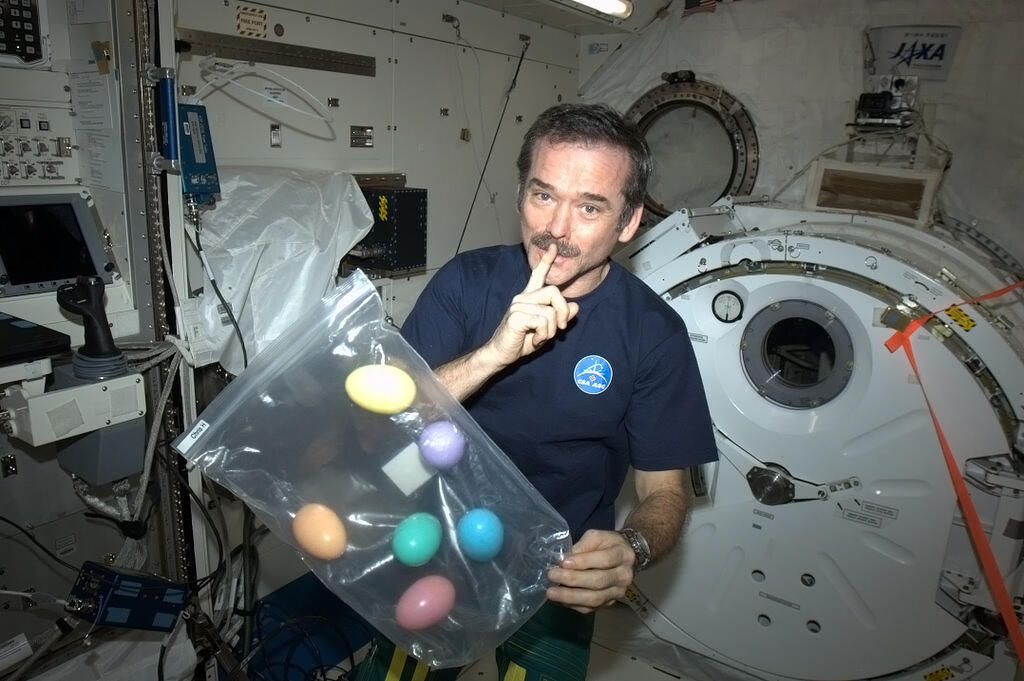
... is edited from this picture, showing Hadfield holding an Easter egg bag.

The International Space Station cannabis experiment hoax is an Internet hoax that purports to show an image of Canadian astronaut Chris Hadfield holding a large baggie of cannabis to demonstrate an experiment concerning getting high by smoking cannabis on the International Space Station. According to Snopes and other websites, the image appeared on Facebook around November 26, 2018; Hadfield replied on Twitter to another similar hoax or possibly the same image in 2016. The photograph is a doctored image of Hadfield holding a plastic zipper storage bag containing Easter eggs, which Hadfield tweeted in 2013. In Hadfield's 2013 autobiography An Astronaut's Guide to Life on Earth (predating the hoax), he described the bag of eggs being permanently stowed on the station for the crew during that holiday.

== See also ==
- List of cannabis hoaxes
- NASA marijuana experiments hoax
