= Urban legends about drugs =

Contemporary folklore about drugs

Many urban legends and misconceptions about drugs have been created and circulated among young people and the general public, with varying degrees of veracity. These are commonly repeated by organizations which oppose all classified drug use, often causing the true effects and dangers of drugs to be misunderstood and less scrutinized. The most common subjects of such false beliefs are LSD, cannabis, and PCP. These misconceptions include misinformation about adulterants or other black market issues, as well as alleged effects of the pure substances.

== Alcohol ==
Urban legends about alcohol.

=== Absinthe is a hallucinogen ===
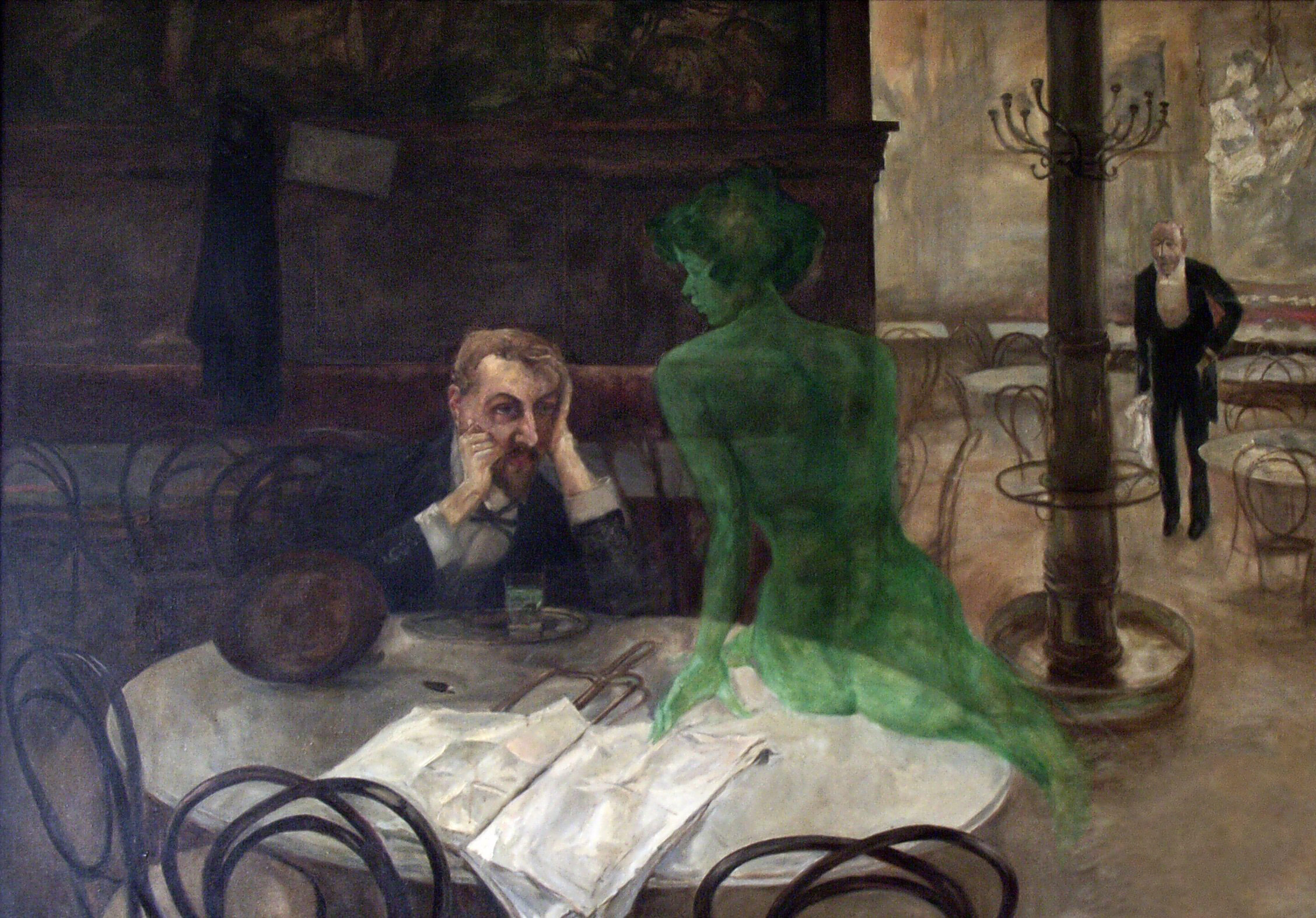
The Absinthe Drinker by Viktor Oliva (1861–1928)

Absinthe has often been portrayed as a dangerously addictive psychoactive drug and hallucinogen, which gave birth to the term "absinthism". The chemical compound thujone, which is present in the spirit in trace amounts, was blamed for its alleged harmful effects. By 1915, absinthe had been banned in the United States and in much of Europe, including France, the Netherlands, Belgium, Switzerland, and Austria-Hungary, yet it has not been demonstrated to be any more dangerous than ordinary spirits. Recent studies have shown that absinthe's psychoactive properties (apart from those attributable to alcohol) have been exaggerated.

=== Recreationally intoxicated elephants from fermented marula fruit ===
South African legends, recorded as early as the 1830s by naturalist Adulphe Delegorgue, describe elephants seeking out the fermented fruit of the marula tree, and showing signs of intoxication, including increased aggression, after doing so. This behavior was controversially depicted in the 1974 documentary Animals Are Beautiful People: the crew of the film reportedly staged the scene, either by soaking the fruit in alcohol before allowing animals to eat it, or by simply injecting the animals with a veterinary anesthetic to elicit symptoms of intoxication. Studies have concluded that it is very unlikely that an elephant could eat enough of the fruit in a day to become drunk; the study instead attributed their aggression to the value of the trees as a food source. Yet it may be possible that another intoxicant is at play – elephants are also known to eat the bark of the tree, which often contains toxic beetle pupae.

== Tobacco ==
=== Menthol cigarettes contain fiberglass ===
A common rumor states that menthol cigarettes or their filters contain fiberglass. In reality, modern cigarette filters are made of a fibrous form of cellulose acetate, which can resemble fiberglass when pulled apart. In the past, some cigarettes did contain asbestos in their filters. Another version of this myth states that chewing tobacco contains fiberglass, which allegedly creates small cuts in the mouth, enhancing nicotine absorption.

=== Some cigarette brands are owned by the KKK ===
Another urban legend states that some cigarette brands (most often Marlboro, Camel, and Kool), or menthol cigarettes in general, are owned by, manufactured by, or otherwise have connections to the Ku Klux Klan, or are intended to harm black people specifically. There is no credible evidence for any connection between cigarettes and the KKK.

== Lysergic acid diethylamide (LSD) ==
Some of the strangest urban legends told are those about lysergic acid diethylamide (LSD), a potent psychedelic drug that gained popularity in several countries in the 1960s and 1970s, and experienced a resurgence in the mid-2010s to present. The drug's relation to the 1960s counterculture was likely part of the reason for such legends.

=== Babysitter places baby in the oven while high on LSD ===
This is an unverifiable drug-scare story dating to the 1960s of a hippie babysitter girl putting a baby in the oven and a turkey in the bassinet. It has been debunked by Snopes.com. This myth is parodied in The Simpsons episode "The Secret War of Lisa Simpson", in which the children go on a school field trip to a "scared straight" wax museum at the local police station. One exhibit contains a wax dummy of a hippie woman eating a sandwich with a baby in it. Chief Wiggum says "That's right, she's got the munchies for a California Cheeseburger!"

In May 2009, partial ostension of this legend may have occurred when a 30-year old Ohio man high on PCP allegedly tried to put his newborn baby into a conventional oven, only to be stopped in time by the baby's mother. Also, in March 2010, a Kentucky man put his five-week-old baby in an oven (without turning it on, and without any injury) while drunk and high on marijuana (which he had smoked earlier that night) that he alleged made him feel strange and suspected was laced with a different drug that made him hallucinate; he was also tired from working. In 2005, China Arnold murdered her near month-old baby with a microwave oven, but she claimed that she was under the influence of alcohol, not LSD.

There are a limited number of cases reported in which babies were put into microwaves, though these cases were not known to involve any drugs, and were instead often cases of deliberate infanticide. However, there have been no known cases of microwaving (or baking) babies involving LSD specifically, or any other psychedelic drug, including cannabis. However, there have been many reported cases of psychotic violence under the influence of PCP. PCP, a dissociative anesthetic, is unrelated to LSD, a psychedelic drug.

=== Bad acid ===
A "bad trip" is easily caused by an expectation or fear of ill effects, which may later be blamed on "bad acid". This legend was made famous at the 1969 Woodstock festival, when concert-goers were warned to stay away from "the brown acid", which was allegedly bad.

One possible reason people believe that they had "bad acid" could be because they were simply sold a much higher dose than usual, which is not uncommon due to the inherent lack of quality control of illicit drugs, and with LSD in particular being effective at microgram rather than milligram doses. The stronger the dose, the stronger and potentially more anxiety-provoking the trip can get. But in the case of the "brown acid", the LSD - which does not evaporate - was dissolved in a liquid that did evaporate, thus increasing the concentration and the dose per drop.

However, drugs sometimes falsely represented by sellers as LSD in the 1970s were actually PCP, amphetamine, or other drugs that have quite different, and often unfavorable, effects from LSD, causing unwitting users to incorrectly attribute a "bad trip" to LSD. There are now many research chemicals (DOB 2C-I, DOC, DOI, etc.) that can be nearly indistinguishable from real LSD before use, and thus can be easily confused with "bad acid". Some of these, such as 25I-NBOMe, are even potent enough for psychoactive doses to fit on blotter paper, and may occasionally be sold as LSD when the latter is scarce. The idea of adulterating blotter LSD with these chemicals, however, has no known basis in fact.

=== "Bananadine" LSD ===
The false claim states that it is possible to synthesize LSD or some similar hallucinogenic drug called "bananadine" from banana peels or other common household foods and chemicals. The actual synthesis of LSD usually requires advanced knowledge and experience in organic chemistry and requires both expensive laboratory equipment and expensive, carefully controlled precursor chemicals.

Originating from a recipe originally published as a hoax in the Berkeley Barb in March 1967, variants of this legend often circulate on the Internet and were popular on BBSs well before the widespread availability of Internet access through William Powell's The Anarchist Cookbook. This book claimed "Musa sapientum Bananadine" was a mild psychoactive drug found in banana peels. The slang terms "mellow yellow" and "saffron" (for the color of the peels) were borrowed from the 1966 Donovan song, "Mellow Yellow", perhaps because the phrase "electrical banana" is mentioned in one of the lines. According to The Rolling Stone Illustrated Encyclopedia of Rock and Roll, Donovan claimed he was actually referring to a banana-shaped vibrator.

=== Blue star tattoos ===
This legend frequently surfaces in American elementary and middle schools in the form of a flyer that has been photocopied through many generations, which is distributed to parents by concerned school officials. It has also become popular on Internet mailing lists and websites. This legend states that a temporary lick-and-stick tattoo soaked in LSD and made in the form of a blue star, or of popular children's cartoon characters, is being distributed to children in the area in order to get them addicted to LSD. The flyer lists an inaccurate description of the effects of LSD, some attribution (typically to a well-regarded hospital or a vaguely specified "adviser to the president"), and instructs parents to contact police if they come across the blue star tattoos. No actual cases of LSD distribution to children in this manner have ever been documented. LSD is not addictive, and it is unlikely to be abused by an unwitting user. Therefore, there is no plausible motivation for a drug dealer to distribute LSD in this manner.

=== Legally insane ===
There is an urban legend that a person who has used LSD more than seven times is automatically declared legally insane. The same claim is often suggested with large doses, the difference being that the person is considered psychotic only for the duration of the trip. An extension of this legend is that a person who does LSD more than "X number of times" is permanently disqualified from the military as a result of being "legally insane", a version which was likely inspired by wishful thinking of drug-using draft dodgers in the 1960s. But no such law exists, at least not in the United States. However, the United States Air Force has regulations limiting and prohibiting recruitment of pre-service drug users, including prohibition of proven or admitted LSD users.

A version of this legend was repeated as fact on TV's Dragnet series in 1967, in an episode revolving around the use of LSD before it was made illegal. The script described a shipment containing "one pound of LSD [tabs], enough to turn the entire population of Los Angeles into dangerous psychotics" on the premise that one dose made a person legally insane due to the recurrence of completely unpredictable flashbacks throughout the user's life after a single dose.

=== LSD causes genetic mutations ===
Beginning in 1967, studies raised concerns that LSD might produce genetic damage or developmental abnormalities in fetuses. However, these initial reports were based on in vitro studies or were poorly controlled and have not been substantiated. In studies of chromosomal changes in human users and in monkeys, the balance of evidence suggests no increase in chromosomal damage. For example, white blood cells of people who had been given LSD in a clinical setting were examined for visible chromosomal abnormalities; overall, there appeared to be no lasting changes. Several studies have been conducted using illicit LSD users and provide a less clear picture. Interpretation of this data is generally complicated by factors such as the unknown chemical composition of street LSD, concurrent use of other psychoactive drugs, and diseases such as hepatitis in the sampled populations. It seems possible that the small number of genetic abnormalities reported in users of street LSD is either coincidental or related to factors other than a toxic effect of pure LSD. A 2008 medical review concluded, "The available data suggest that pure LSD does not cause chromosomal abnormalities, spontaneous abortions, or congenital malformations." Another large study, published in 2022, found no evidence to support the urban myth.

=== Man permanently thinks that he is a glass of orange juice ===
Another common legend, again dating back to the 1960s, was that a man who took LSD went insane and permanently thought that he was a glass of orange juice. Because of this, he could never bend over, slept upright and did not make any sudden movements over fear of being "spilt". Alternative versions sometimes have the man thinking he is a glass of milk or a whole orange. Another version of this myth states that the man believed he had become an orange, and was afraid he would be 'peeled' by his friends.

=== Police officer unwittingly drinks LSD ===
In this legend, which dates back to 1970, a police (or customs) officer pulls over a driver believed to have been drinking, sees that the driver has a water bottle, and demands a taste of it to see if it contains alcohol. The officer does not taste any alcohol, so the driver either gets off completely or merely gets a speeding ticket. Shortly afterward, the officer begins tripping very hard and stares into space, since the swig of "water" he took actually contained numerous "hits" of LSD. In some versions of the legend, the officer consumes enough LSD to actually go insane. According to Snopes.com, there are no verifiable reports of this ever happening, even decades after the legend was first told, and it is thus considered spurious.

=== "Permatripping" and HPPD ===
Those with a predisposition to psychological disorders who take LSD or other hallucinogens may trigger a psychotic episode that may produce hallucinations reminiscent of the drugs, enduring beyond the period of its active effects. This leads some individuals experiencing a state of psychosis to mistakenly believe that the effects of the drugs have not and will not subside.

Those with the same predisposition also have a heightened chance of developing hallucinogen persisting perception disorder (HPPD) after using psychoactive substances. Because of this, the legend may have had its foundation in HPPD following drug use. Clinical research increasingly distinguishes it from drug-induced psychosis as a distinct, non-psychotic neurological condition.

Chronic use of psychoactive substances can result in flashbacks and HPPD. There remains no consensus regarding the nature and causes of HPPD or flashbacks. A study of 44 HPPD subjects who had previously ingested LSD showed EEG abnormalities.

There is no single consensus for why only some individuals develop HPPD. Those affected by HPPD are not psychotic and recognize the unrealistic nature of their visual disturbances.

=== Retention of LSD in spinal fluid ===
The claim that LSD is permanently retained in the spinal fluid is an urban legend. LSD is metabolized by the liver.

LSD has an elimination half-life of around 2.5 to 4 hours, meaning it does not remain in the spine or any other bodily tissues.

=== Strychnine ===
Anti-drug educators frequently tell their students some variant on the theme of inevitable strychnine poisoning through LSD use, for example, that strychnine is commonly sold as a cheaper substitute for LSD by unscrupulous drug dealers; that strychnine is a byproduct of LSD synthesis; that the body produces strychnine as a result of LSD metabolism; or that strychnine is used as a preservative to prevent the otherwise natural, rapid decomposition of LSD, allowing it to be stored; or that strychnine is somehow necessary to bond LSD to blotter paper. None of this is true. These claims may even be believed and propagated by drug users themselves. In reality, most hallucinogens cause some degree of mental or physical discomfort after the "trip" is over. This is an indirect effect of the drug, not strychnine or any other adulterant. Additionally, strychnine is one of the most bitter substances known, with a detection threshold of 1 part per million, well below toxic levels. Finally, the dangerous dose of strychnine is too high to be contained in a blotter square.

Strychnine has indeed rarely been discovered mixed with LSD and other drugs in a few samples recovered by law enforcement agencies, but these were all found in murder or attempted murder investigations where someone was being specifically targeted for poisoning, and not associated with recreational LSD use.

A related myth was that a type of gang initiation required the initiate to put a mixture of LSD and strychnine on the buttons of as many payphones as possible. This too is debunked by the urban legends website Snopes.com.

=== Sungazing while tripping ===
A popular legend dating back to the 1960s, it has been claimed that several people took LSD and stared at the sun, going blind as a result. This myth appeared in 1967 on the cop show Dragnet, and twice in the mainstream news media. The legend is considered to be unfounded, since in 1968 the source of the hoax, Norman M. Yoder, commissioner of the Office of the Blind in the Pennsylvania State Welfare Department, admitted that he had completely made up the story because of his "concern over illegal LSD use by children". After the sun-gazing on LSD story was widely publicized, a small number of case reports were published in the medical literature which describe this phenomenon temporarily occurring. In one case, the patient was a teenage girl described as having a "hysterical personality" who heard warnings about staring at the sun under LSD in a school anti-drug lecture and thought this "would be a neat thing", and in another case the patient had paranoid schizophrenia.

== Cannabis ==
Many misleading urban legends about cannabis exist. Like LSD rumors, many were spread during the 1960s and 1970s, and are believed to continuously circulate today. These widespread legends claim that it is easy to overdose on the smokeable variant of cannabis and that it is extremely dangerous and addictive when compared to alcohol and tobacco.

Symptoms of withdrawal from cannabis begin after at least 24 hours of abstinence, peak on days 2–6, and subside within two weeks. Withdrawal symptoms are generally mild—loss of appetite, insomnia, feelings of uneasiness/anxiety, irritability, craving, tension, stomach ache, and headache all being common symptoms. There are studies that show no actual increased risk of cancer from smoking marijuana, even when duration of use is expanded over several years. In fact, some studies indicate THC to have anticancer properties, with studies showing tumor reduction in mice.

=== Confusion with Jimson weed ===
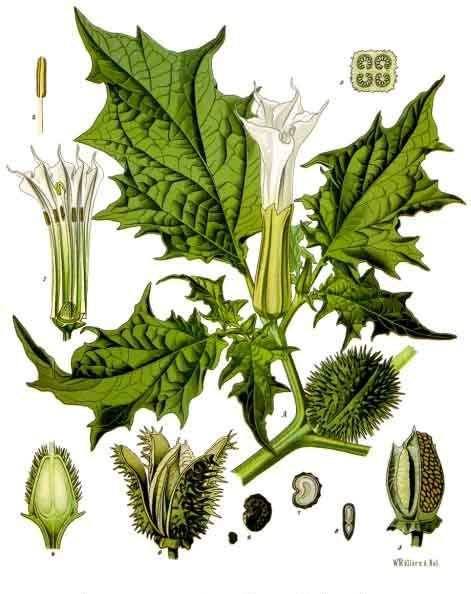
Botanical drawings of Jimson weed

Historically, and possibly related to the "Reefer Madness" legend, some people (particularly Americans) have confused cannabis with Jimson weed (Datura stramonium). Jimson weed, which grows wild in the United States and several other countries, is a potent deliriant which can cause true hallucinations and delusions that are believed by the user to be real, as opposed to the pseudohallucinations and perceptual distortions typically caused by cannabis. Confusion could have resulted from the fact that Datura's common name contains the word "weed", which is also a slang term for cannabis, and the fact that both plants (as well as others) have been given the moniker "locoweed" in the first half of the 20th century.

Aside from these superficial similarities, the two plants are not related, do not resemble one another, and are very unlikely to be confused. Jimson weed is highly toxic and can cause delirium, confusion, hallucinations, blurred vision, photophobia, dry mouth, urinary retention, hyperthermia, incoordination, hypertension, and rapid heartbeat among other effects. An overdose (or suspected overdose) on this substance is considered a medical emergency, as it can cause seizures, coma, or death by cardiac arrest—all parts of Datura plants contain dangerous levels of the tropane alkaloids, specifically atropine, hyoscyamine, and scopolamine, which are classified as deliriants and/or anticholinergics.

=== "Flashbacks" due to release from fat cells ===
Similar to one of the most enduring myths about LSD, and also somewhat related to the "multi-day impairment" legend described further down on this list, this legend claims that residual THC stored in fat cells gets released spontaneously into the bloodstream in enough quantities to get one high again long after the last use of cannabis, be it days, weeks, or even months later. This legend is typically accompanied by anecdotal evidence of people who experience a "high" after doing exercise of some sort. While somewhat more biologically plausible than the discredited LSD legend due to the fat-solubility of THC, this phenomenon remains scientifically unproven. A 2009 study of rats that involved injecting them with large quantities of THC (equivalent to 5–10 joints per day in humans) each day for ten days straight, then subjecting them to simulated severe stress or food deprivation led to double the blood levels of THC−COOH two days after the last THC exposure compared to rats that were neither stressed nor deprived of food. If such results occurred in humans, then it is theoretically possible for a chronic cannabis user to fail a drug test long after the usual detection time due to exercise, dieting, or severe stress shortly before the test—and several anecdotal reports of this exist. However, there is currently no hard evidence that enough active THC would be released to get one "high" or cause "flashbacks". One should also note that flashbacks from psychoactive drugs in general are now known to be psychological phenomena, and drug residues typically play no significant role in their occurrence and recurrence.

As for the anecdotes about exercise, they likely experienced a "runner's high" due to their bodies releasing endorphins, which are endogenous opioid agonists, along with anandamide and other endogenous cannabinoid agonists. These flashbacks have also been reported after one has stretched or stood up/sat or lay down abruptly. In addition, some studies find that the body produces endocannabinoids such as anandamide during exercise, which may also explain such effects since they activate the same receptors as THC.

=== George Washington smoked cannabis ===
There is a common belief that George Washington (and/or other Founding Fathers such as Thomas Jefferson) used cannabis for its psychoactive or medicinal properties. This has even made its way into popular films such as Dazed and Confused.

Both Washington and Jefferson grew cannabis to produce hemp, and Washington used hemp fiber to make clothes for his slaves, but there is no direct evidence that either Washington or Jefferson consumed it for its psychoactive properties. Washington is commonly mis-quoted as saying "Make the most of the Indian hemp seed, and sow it everywhere," often cited as a note to his gardener published in The Washington Papers. However the closest phrase to this in The Washington Papers is in a letter to William Pearce – "I am very glad to hear that the Gardener has saved so much of the St. foin seed, and that of the India Hemp. Make the most you can of both, by sowing them again in drills. [...] The Hemp may be sown any where."

In The Papers of George Washington, "hemp" is defined as Cannabis sativa grown for fiber, and "Indian hemp" typically refers to the closely related Cannabis indica. While Washington was growing cannabis for its fiber, both of these species are also cultivated for their psychoactive and medicinal properties.

When cannabis is grown for its medicinal or psychoactive properties, male plants are routinely separated from females to prevent pollination, as non-pollinated female plants produce the most potent and prized flowering tops, known as sinsemilla (from the Spanish "sin semilla", meaning "without seed"). To produce sinsemilla, the sexes must be separated before pollination occurs. On August 7, 1765, Washington wrote in his diary "Began to separate the Male from the Female hemp at Do.– rather too late." While this has been taken as evidence that Washington was growing cannabis for its psychoactive or medicinal properties, The Straight Dope points out that later entries in Washington's diary suggest that "he divided the plants because the males made stronger fiber while the female plants produced the seed needed for the next year's crop." Two days after he wrote the aforementioned entry in his diary, Washington wrote that he had "put some Hemp in the Rivr. to Rot," a technique called water retting used for producing hemp, not psychoactive cannabis. The following month he wrote that he "Began to Pull the Seed Hemp but it was not sufficiently ripe," and three weeks later that the "Hempseed seems to be in good order for getting – that is of a proper ripeness."

The introductory editorial for the June 2010 cannabinoid-themed issue of the British Journal of Pharmacology said that "there are sources that suggest that chronic tooth-ache may have led the first President of the United States, George Washington, to grow the plant for medicinal purposes," though these sources are not cited. The cover of the issue featured images of Washington and Queen Victoria placed on either side of a cannabis leaf.

=== An allergic reaction to molecules found in marijuana killed Bruce Lee ===
A number of rumours surfaced surrounding the cause of action film star Bruce Lee's death in 1973, one of which was that he had been killed by the consumption of cannabis. Lee died of a cerebral edema several hours after taking the painkiller and muscle relaxant equagesic. His autopsy showed trace amounts of cannabis in his stomach, and he had been known to use cannabis. However, a doctor at the coroner's hearing was quoted as saying that the cannabis in Lee's stomach was "no more significant than if Bruce had drunk a cup of tea that day."

Lee's physician, Donald Langford, and Peter Wu, a doctor who had treated Lee for another edema ten weeks earlier, believed that the fatal edema could have been caused by a rare allergic reaction to an alkaloid in cannabis, as a large quantity of hashish was removed from his stomach during the earlier edema, and he had been warned not to use it again. Wu told the coroner he believed the death was due to hypersensitivity to either cannabis or equagesic. However, Ronald D. Teare, a professor of forensic medicine at the University of London who was flown in to be the chief expert in the coroner's report, said that it was both "irresponsible and irrational" to attribute either edema to cannabis, and concluded the fatal edema was due to a rare reaction to equagesic. Teare, who had supervised nearly 100,000 autopsies and provided evidence for nearly 20,000 inquests in his 35 years of experience, was echoed by R. R. Lycette, the clinical pathologist at Queen Elizabeth Hospital. Lycette told the hearing that his death could not have been caused by cannabis, and that Lee had died from an edema caused by a reaction to one or both of the ingredients in equagesic.

At the time in Hong Kong, cannabis was seen in an extremely negative light—worse than opium—and was "considered a 'foreign' drug with sinister and evil undertones." Bruce Thomas, author of Bruce Lee: Fighting Spirit stated that "this view had a massive impact on the official findings," and that Wu's inclusion of cannabis as a suspected cause of death "reflected this cultural and even political pressure." Wu later said in a 1992 interview with Thomas:

Professor Teare was a forensic scientist recommended by Scotland Yard; he was brought in as the expert, so we can't contradict his testimony. The dosage of cannabis is neither precise nor predictable, but I've never known anyone to die simply from taking it.

Although it could not be completely ruled out that cannabis caused the edema, Teare's view was accepted by the coroner, and the official verdict was "death by misadventure" caused by a reaction to equigesic. Cannabis was not included as a possible cause of Lee's death.

=== Reefer madness ===
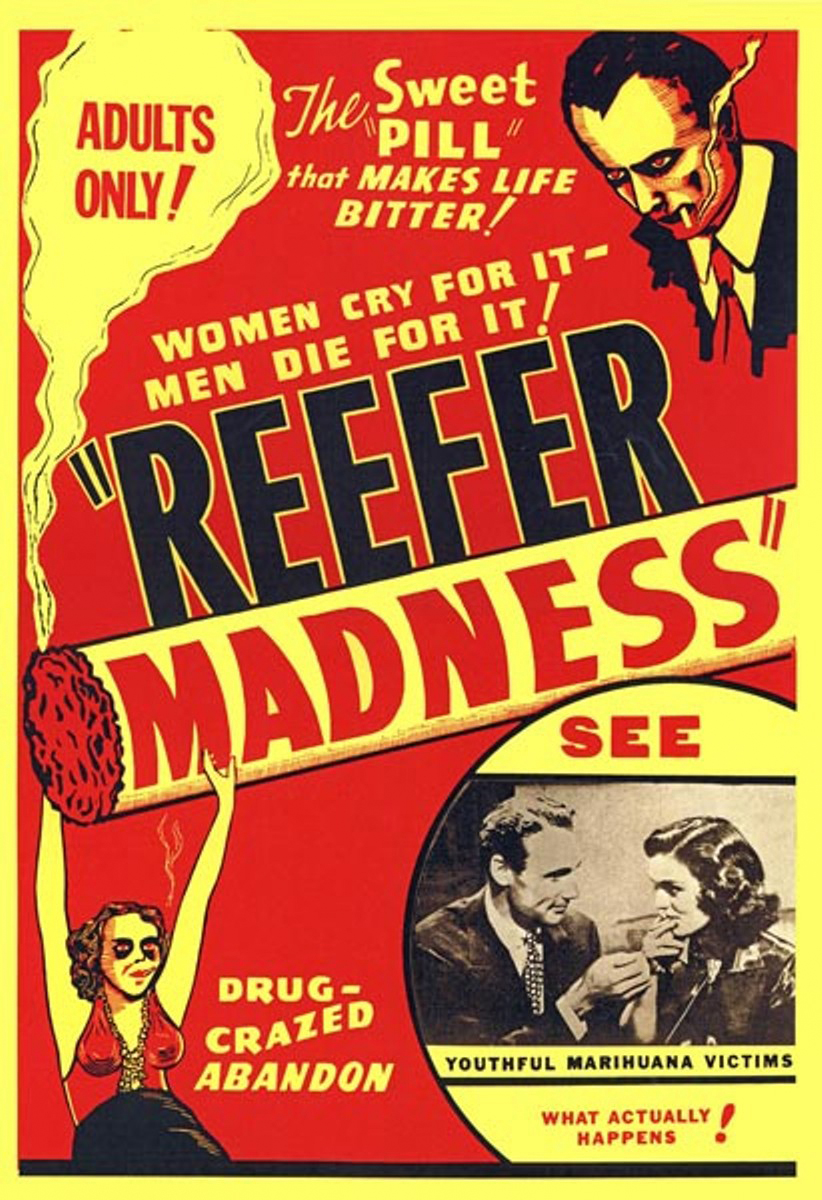
The poster for the 1936 film Reefer Madness

Originating in the 1930s, this myth was the basis for films like Reefer Madness, and used by Harry Anslinger of the Federal Bureau of Narcotics as justification for outlawing cannabis. The allegation was that even the calmest, most normal person could be transformed into a psychopathic killer or rapist solely from smoking a joint.

No relationship has ever been proven linking such crimes to the acute intoxication of cannabis alone, and cannabis' psychological effects tend to be more associated with pacifism and inactivity than with aggression. For example, studies of the Jamaican working class showed no difference in the crime rates between users and non-user of cannabis.

=== Smoking or "chasing" cannabis with tobacco increases the high ===
In many places, cannabis is routinely mixed with tobacco when rolled into joints. In North America, cannabis in any form is also often "chased" with a tobacco cigarette, and hollowed-out cigars filled with cannabis (blunts) are also popular in some subcultures. Some users say that smoking tobacco increases the cannabis high, and this is often attributed to either the nicotine or additives such as menthol. Until recently, this was based solely on anecdotal evidence. There may be at least some truth to this legend, as a 2005 study found that a transdermal nicotine patch modestly enhanced the subjective "high" of cannabis relative to a placebo patch—but only in males. Females actually saw a slight reduction in subjective effects. Reasons for the enhancement are not well understood, and this study appears to be the only one as of 2010 that found such effects. However, another study found a significant downside to the practice. It appears that tobacco, which is known to be highly addictive, also enhances the likelihood of developing cannabis dependence symptoms when the two substances are used concurrently.

=== Some Lucky Strike cigarettes contained cannabis ===
It has been claimed the cigarette brand Lucky Strike is so named because every so often, a consumer of the product would have a "lucky strike", finding a cannabis spliff in a pack of cigarettes. The rumor varies in how often the cannabis cigarette would be included, anywhere from one in every thousand cartons to one in every pack. It is unclear when this myth originated; Snopes.com claims it has been floating around for "many years". Lucky Strike's slogan "It's Toasted" fueled belief in the myth further ('toasted' being one slang term for being high on cannabis). Despite the popularity of the myth, there are no reliable reports of any Lucky Strike cigarette containing cannabis. The name "Lucky Strike", in reality, is only a marketing ploy, implying to customers that obtaining their brand is a "Lucky Strike". The "It's Toasted" slogan refers to the product's tobacco being toasted instead of sun-dried, making a supposedly better-tasting product.

Other urban legends offshoot from this one. One of the explanations for the origin of flipping a "lucky" cigarette upside down claims the practice originated from the Lucky Strike myth; it is presumed the superstition arose from flipping the marijuana-containing cigarette upside-down in order to save it for last.

=== Popularity in the United States in the 1960s ===
Although the 1960s are commonly perceived as a time of rampant marijuana use compared with the present day, in a 1969 Gallup poll, only 4% of American adults had tried marijuana and 34% did not know its effects. In contrast, later Gallup polls show that the percentage of adults who had tried marijuana had risen to 33% by 1985 and 34% by 1999.

== MDMA (ecstasy) ==
The third most common illicit drug that is the source of urban legends is 3,4-methylenedioxymethamphetamine (MDMA), better known as "ecstasy". In the United States, this substance was banned in 1985, and other countries followed suit. Among American youth, MDMA was most popular in the 1990s and early 2000s, peaking in 2001 and declining thereafter. It was during this time of rather faddish use that numerous urban legends and misconceptions began to surface and be spread through the media, and not all of them necessarily originated from anti-drug organizations.

=== MDMA drains spinal fluid ===
This myth appears to be derived from research in 1994 in which serotonin breakdown products were measured in the spinal fluid of ecstasy users. However, it was the researchers, not the drug, who drained the fluid (for the purpose of testing). Nonetheless, this legend (and related ones about it damaging one's spinal cord and/or spinal column, which is also false) was popularized in 2000 by Eminem's songs "Drug Ballad" and "The Kids".

=== "Stacks"—Single, double, triple etc. ===
Many ecstasy users describe the potency of various ecstasy pills in terms of their stack such as double stack or triple stack pills. These claims are dubious as there is no way to verify potency objectively without proper testing. The term "stack" is not intended to measure potency of ecstasy pills, but it is used as a measurement of mass. Single stacks weigh in at 0.20 grams, doubles at 0.40 grams, and triples at 0.60 grams. Furthermore, a high percentage of what is sold as "ecstasy" may contain a combination of MDMA and one or more other substances or may in fact contain no MDMA at all. For these reasons, the "stack" system of strength description is not necessarily trustworthy—as is commonly the case in the underground drug market.

== Methamphetamine ==
Though initially there were not very many urban legends about methamphetamine ("crank", "crystal meth", "ice"), the "meth epidemic" of the late 1990s and early 2000s (especially in the USA) led to quite a few new legends.

=== Lung damage from recrystallization ===
One meth legend refers to the method of administration in which the user will heat/melt crystal methamphetamine and inhale the resulting methamphetamine vapor. The legend states that the drug, once inhaled, will re-crystallize in large amounts inside the lungs, damaging them in the process. This is a false claim as crystallized methamphetamine is always in the form of a salt (usually methamphetamine hydrochloride), which is highly soluble in water, as well as hydrophilic, and is instantly absorbed into the user's bloodstream via the alveoli.

However, intravenous methylphenidate (Ritalin) use results in a type of lung damage commonly known as Ritalin lung. Methylphenidate tablets are crushed and dissolved into solution for intravenous injection. The tablets contain talc and other particulates which can deposit in the lung (talcosis) and result in severe emphysema affecting all the lobes of the lung. The "Ritalin lung" effect could be a source of rumors about methamphetamine damaging the lungs.

=== Strawberry Quik ===
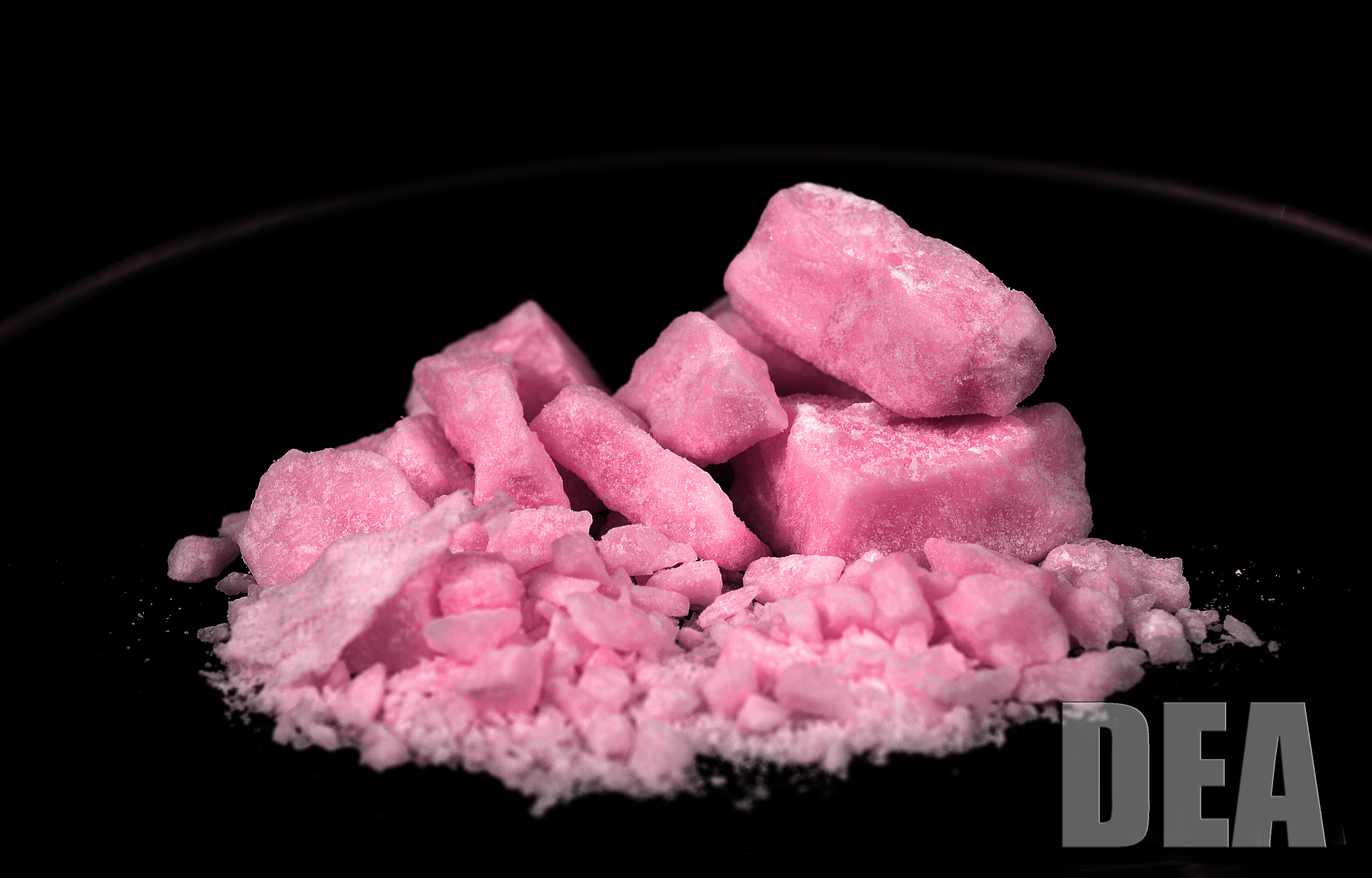
Methamphetamine dyed with pink food coloring

Another meth legend is that dealers are selling colored and flavored meth resembling candy (often with names like Strawberry Quick, originating from an idea that dealers would mix the drug with strawberry-flavored Nesquik) to entice children to buy it. It was first reported in 2007 in the western United States, and children were allegedly ingesting it thinking it was candy, and ending up in the ER. According to Snopes.com there is no hard evidence, as of October 2008, that flavored meth is being handed out in schoolyards, nor that children are mistaking meth for candy.

== Heroin ==
=== Cotton fever ===
Cotton fever is a high fever supposedly caused by injecting cotton fibers into the bloodstream when shooting up heroin. Cotton is sometimes used as a crude filter for particulate matter prior to intravenous injection. Other commonly blamed substances include fiberglass if a cigarette filter was used (cigarette filters do not contain fiberglass), or dirt if Mexican heroin was injected. In general, cotton fever refers to a fever that users believe is caused by inanimate particulate matter injected into the bloodstream. In reality, the particulate matter causing cotton fever is bacteria from lack of sterile technique. Most cases of cotton fever resolve as the body clears the infection. Users will often seek medical attention when cotton fever persists. Persistent cotton fever is often infective endocarditis. Although endotoxin shed by the bacteria Enterobacter agglomerans, which colonizes cotton plants, has been implicated as the cause of cotton fever, most clinical cases demonstrate blood cultures positive for skin and fecal bacteria.

=== "Cheese" ===
"Cheese" or "Tylenol with Smack" is a heroin-based recreational drug that came to the attention of the media inside and outside the United States after a string of deaths among adolescents in the Dallas-Fort Worth Metroplex, between 2005 and 2007. It is generally reported to be a mixture of heroin and Tylenol PM (an OTC acetaminophen and diphenhydramine combination) or its generic equivalent, in varying ratios.

It seems likely that the concept was originally created as a joke, and after seizures of low purity heroin cut with paracetamol (acetaminophen) "validated" the claims, the DEA issued a warning. Although the source of the original hoax is gone, newspapers and media outlets continue to make reference to each other with no mention of any primary sources, perpetuating the myth of cheese as "starter heroin" for children. However, there may have been some ostension of this legend in 2007 involving a few individuals in Texas.

In the South Park episode "Major Boobage", which aired for the first time on 28 March 2008, 'cheesing' referred to a moral panic about children using cat urine to get high.

== Phencyclidine (PCP) ==
=== Embalming fluid ===
A commonly held misconception is that phencyclidine (PCP, angel dust) is the same as (or is synthesized from) embalming fluid. Some people, believing this myth, have actually attempted to smoke cigarettes or cannabis dipped in real embalming fluid (i.e. formaldehyde), which is highly toxic. Conversely, some users of PCP-laced cannabis believe (and are often told) that it contains embalming fluid proper and not PCP, or that the slang term "dust" really means embalming fluid proper. Sometimes, the two substances are even mixed together, in a further ostension of this legend. The combination might be called "fry", "wet", "illy", "sherm", "worm", "water-water", "amp", "dust(ed)", or other names.

=== Rodney King was on PCP at the time of his 1991 beating and arrest ===
The Rodney King police beating case in Los Angeles was a source of much controversy and outrage, as well as urban legends. Because King resisted arrest, with several officers needed to subdue him, he was assumed to be on PCP at the time due to its reputation for inciting violent and unpredictable behavior coupled with an inability to feel pain (often misinterpreted as "superhuman" strength, see below). However, toxicology found only alcohol and traces of marijuana in his system.

=== Man slices off his face and feeds it to dogs ===
One legend holds that a man who, while under the influence of the drug, thoroughly sliced off pieces of his own face, including his eyes, to feed to his pet dogs. Some versions of this tale say he suffered permanent brain damage as well. This legend is remarkably similar to what the character Mason Verger did in Thomas Harris' 1999 novel Hannibal. The legend, however, dates back earlier than 1999, and can be traced to former New York homicide detective Vernon J. Geberth, who writes about it in his book Practical Homicide Investigation. According to Geberth, this actually did occur to a man named Michael, and Geberth was one of the detectives called to the scene. A 1989 book by Dr. Joseph Sacco also mentions this story, albeit with a few differences in the details.

=== Superhuman strength ===
Some reports cite a widely held belief that PCP can give its users "superhuman" strength for the duration of its effects, and there are several anecdotes alleging this phenomenon. Sometimes, the related controversial pseudoscientific concept of "excited delirium" is invoked in these anecdotes. However, the drug does not typically make the user significantly stronger in reality than they otherwise would be.

== Psilocybin mushrooms ==
=== Super Mario connection to psilocybin mushrooms ===
One legend that is popular among both the drug and video gaming subcultures is that the mushroom powerup in Super Mario games is actually based on psilocybin mushrooms. Somewhat lending credit to the legend, Shigeru Miyamoto, the creator of the Super Mario series, has stated that he chose mushrooms for their relationship to "magical realms", and has drawn connections to other works featuring mushrooms with mysterious powers, such as Lewis Carroll's Alice's Adventures in Wonderland, a story in which eating specific mushrooms cause one to change size. The mushrooms depicted in the game (white circles on red caps) also have a similar appearance to Amanita muscaria which, while being quite distinct from psilocybin mushrooms ("magic mushrooms"), still have hallucinogenic properties, and have been used by humans for their intoxicating effects for hundreds of years.

== Designer drugs ==
The advent of novel illegal or quasi-legal designer drugs intended as substitutes or alternatives to illegal drugs has given rise to several new legends as well.

=== Cannibalism from "bath salts" ===
In 2012, novel substituted cathinones, nicknamed "bath salts" as a result of mephedrone originally being sold as bath salts in the US to evade consumer protection laws, were implicated in several violent attacks, including some highly publicized cases of cannibalism. However, the most well-known cannibal attacker from Miami, Rudy Eugene, tested negative for all drugs known to be nicknamed "bath salts" and every other known psychoactive substance except traces of cannabis.

== General ==
In addition to legends about specific drugs, there are also some more generic ones that are often applied to several types of drugs. Typically, these legends involve rather morbid themes and/or targeted children, but some are told with more levity for the purpose of humor.

=== Drugs smuggled in baby's corpse ===
This legend, dating back to the early 1970s and first appearing on the Internet in 1996, claims that drug traffickers are smuggling illegal drugs (typically cocaine) in hollowed-out dead babies to avoid detection. Allegedly, tourists' babies are kidnapped, killed, cut open, filled with drugs, and sewn shut so the contraband can be more readily sneaked over the border. However, according to U.S. Customs and other law enforcement agencies, there are no verifiable reports of this ever happening, and thus this myth is unfounded.

=== Drug-laced candy or lollipops given to schoolchildren ===
This legend, which surfaced on the Internet just in time for Halloween in October 2004, claimed that drug dealers were giving lollipops laced with drugs, typically a combination of THC and PCP, to unsuspecting children and causing them great harm. Such suckers are allegedly referred to as "dro pops" or something to that effect, and various towns around the country have had their own versions of the legend. According to the U.S. DEA, suckers containing THC and/or PCP were found and confiscated in Chicago in the spring of 2004. They also report that in 2003 and 2004 some psilocybin mushroom chocolate candies were seized near Amarillo, Texas, and that hollowed-out lollipops filled with heroin have been seized in New York City. The goal of doing so was likely to evade detection by law enforcement by disguising the drugs as candy. There is no evidence that these were ever given to children, much less that any such children were harmed, or even that such lollipops have been found outside of these specific locations or anywhere since early 2004. Thus, this legend can be considered to be in a similar vein as the infamous blue star tattoo legend.

=== Drug-related Halloween legends ===
Related to the above legend, various drugs have also found their way into the more general and perennial Halloween poisoning legends. Allegedly, unsuspecting trick-or-treaters are given candy (or sometimes fruits) laced with poisons, needles, razor blades, and drugs by strangers. However, virtually all reports of this happening are now known to be either hoaxes, events unrelated to Halloween candy, or non-random poisonings by relatives made to look random. The latest manifestation of drug-related Halloween legends was a prediction by Sheriff Lee Baca of Los Angeles that cannabis edibles (from medical marijuana dispensaries) would possibly end up in the hands of trick-or-treaters on Halloween in 2010. Baca even went so far as to confiscate cannabis edibles from circulation in an attempt to prevent this from happening, and displayed them on television two days before Halloween. Again, there is no evidence that cannabis-laced treats were ever given out to trick-or-treaters in 2010 or in any other year.

=== "Gnome" legend ===
Another legend involves a group of teenagers who, while drunk and/or tripping on some sort of hallucinogen, find what they perceive to be a gnome (sometimes a dwarf, hobgoblin or smurf), capture it, and bring it home. They sleep off the drug's effects, and the next morning they find out that the "gnome" was really a lost (and very frightened) child. Though the story may be told by some tellers in a negative light, it may also have a positive spin in that the teens become unwitting heroes in finding a missing child whose parents (as well as the police) had been unable to find. According to Snopes.com, the legend had first surfaced in 2004, and as of 2020 the legend's truth status remains undetermined and unverifiable. In some versions of a legend the "gnome" is not a child but a person with dwarfism or Down syndrome; some have even gone as far to say it was a dead baby.

=== "Homeopathic" drug water ===
In 2004–2005, an Internet rumor was being spread that claimed that LSD (and other drugs) were being diluted with water to extremely low concentrations, which allegedly made the drugs even more powerful, yet cheaper and undetectable. This is related to the pseudoscientific "Law of Infinitesimals", one of the principles behind homeopathy. However, there is no evidence that this actually has effects different from a placebo, or that a significant number of users or dealers were ever actually doing this.

== Drug testing ==
The increasingly common practice of drug testing, especially urinalysis, has led to an increase in the number of drug users looking for ways to beat the tests, and has spawned a number of urban legends as a result. Time is the only scientifically proven method for certainly passing a test, apart from not consuming any substances at all that are likely to be tested for. However, this does not stop users from getting creative in their attempts to somehow shorten the detection times and/or mask the contents of their fluid specimens, with varying degrees of success or lack thereof.

=== Secondhand exposure will cause a positive test ===
This legend is technically true but highly misleading. According to a U.S. Army study, the amount of secondhand cannabis smoke needed to cause a false positive result (failure) is quite large indeed, and would require being sealed in an unventilated car or small room filled with marijuana being actively smoked (often referred to as a "hotbox") for several hours. Hair testing, however, is a different matter, particularly with passive exposure to crack/cocaine, which can deposit onto hair and be readily incorporated into it. With regards to cannabis, however, typically only metabolites (produced by the body and thus not found in smoke) are tested rather than THC, so failure is unlikely to result from non-extreme passive exposure.

=== High doses of niacin will help you pass ===
Niacin, also known as Vitamin B_{3}, is speciously claimed by some to "burn it out" of one's system when taken at high doses (250–500 mg per day). While some Internet (and other) sources claim that this works wonders, there is no supporting scientific evidence. Very high doses can also cause adverse side effects.

This legend may have been (inadvertently) inspired by Narconon, a Scientology-based drug rehabilitation program that uses exercise, saunas, and dangerously high doses of niacin (and other vitamins) to detox. It is also part of L. Ron Hubbard's general Purification Rundown, which can supposedly remove pollutants as well as drug residues. Although some drug users claim that this has worked, there are currently no peer-reviewed scientific studies to back these methods up.

== Drug checking ==
=== Moonshine ===
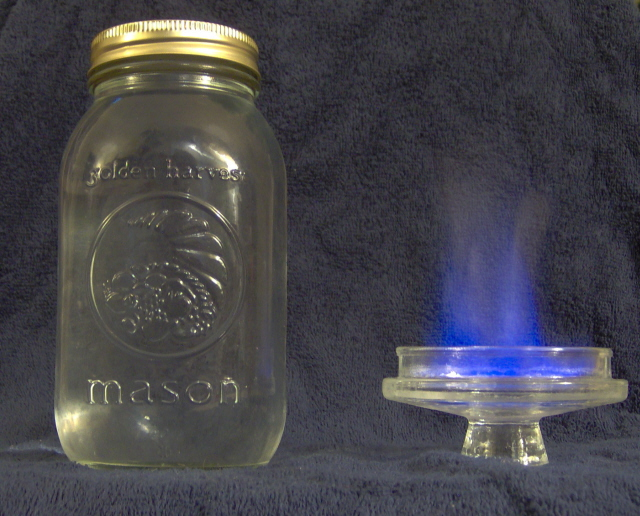
A typical jar of moonshine, with a sample being ignited to produce a blue flame. It was once wrongly believed that the blue flame meant that it was safe to drink.

A common folk test for the quality of moonshine was to pour a small quantity of it into a spoon and set it on fire. The theory was that a safe distillate burns with a blue flame, but a tainted distillate burns with a yellow flame. Practitioners of this simple test also held that if a radiator coil had been used as a condenser, then there would be lead in the distillate, which would give a reddish flame. This led to the mnemonic, "Lead burns red and makes you dead," or simply, "Red means dead." In actual fact, the flame color of lead is not red but blue-white.

== See also ==
- Moral panic
