= Buffalo Chronicle =

American fake news website

- Website type: Fake news website
- Founded: 2014
- Owner: Matthew Ricchiazzi
- Website: buffalochronicle.com

The Buffalo Chronicle is an American fake news website created in 2014 by Matthew Ricchiazzi. It has run fake stories concerning one or more Canadian politicians, and has paid to have its content about them run on Facebook.

== Content ==
BuzzFeed News reported in 2019, "While the Buffalo Chronicle has been publishing stories about politics in western New York since 2014, a shift to sensational Canadian content earlier this year has brought Ricchiazzi success on social media."

=== Canadian politics ===
In February 2019, the Buffalo Chronicle published an article titled "Wernick likely to depart the Trudeau government as RCMP probes SNC Lavalin influence", claiming that Michael Wernick was set to leave his job in "the next several days". The story was sent by the media monitoring desk of the Privy Council Office to various civil servants, despite Wernick not having been interviewed by the RCMP and SNC-Lavalin not donating to the Liberal Party. That afternoon, the Privy Council Office's director of media affairs said, "I will speak with my team about double-checking the validity of news sources. We have been keeping a close eye on coverage related to the Clerk and unfortunately this one slipped through. We will be more cautious going forward." Wernick would not resign until April.

Prior to the 2019 Canadian federal election, the Buffalo Chronicle claimed without evidence that Canadian prime minister Justin Trudeau was looking to suppress a supposed sex scandal involving a student at the West Point Grey Academy, where Trudeau taught at between 1998 and 2001, and that they had seen a "password-protected" non-disclosure agreement sent by the supposed student's father. The latter claim was cited in January 2022 by Infowars host Owen Shroyer, who claimed that Trudeau had signed a $1 million non-disclosure agreement with a minor who had allegedly accused him of sexual misconduct. The video clip of Shroyer was shared by James Wells, a former British Member of the European Parliament.

The Buffalo Chronicle also falsely claimed that Trudeau had filed an injunction to prevent The Globe and Mail from publishing an investigation into the supposed sex scandal. When there was a delay in the paper's distribution to certain kiosks in Ottawa and Quebec, several online sources attributed the delay to the supposed injunction. The Globe's communications manager told Agence France-Presse that the paper "had technical press delays in the Montreal area plant".

=== US politics ===
In November 2020, the website published an article falsely claiming that Philadelphia mafia boss Joey Merlino was paid $3 million to forge 300,000 votes for Joe Biden in that year's presidential election. In June 2022, Philadelphia City Commissioner Lisa Deeley told lawmakers that the article prompted violent threats against her.

In 2022, a satirical cannabis hoax Buffalo Chronicle story about Amtrak selling cannabis onboard U.S. trains, and allowing consumption in designated smoking cars, at the urging of Senate Majority Leader Chuck Schumer, a proponent of cannabis legalization, was reprinted in its entirety in Railway Age along with commentary. The story had Schumer saying the regulation "will improve the passenger experience and increase ticket sales".

== Owner ==
The website is owned by Matthew Ricchiazzi, a Buffalo resident who sought office in several New York state elections without success. Ricchiazzi has described himself as an urban planning aficionado, and has identified as bisexual. According to The Brooklyn Paper, Ricchiazzi has "cultivated a reputation as a political dirty trickster".

In 2012, BuzzFeed identified Ricchiazzi as the person behind the "Committee to Save the Eric County Republican Party", which published anti-gay attack ads against New York Republicans who voted in favor of the Marriage Equality Act. A 2019 investigation by BuzzFeed News and the Toronto Star found that Ricchiazzi had previously offered to publish positive or negative coverage of political candidates for money, which is a violation of journalistic ethics.

Richiazzi is also the operator of the San Francisco Inquirer, another fake news website, and The South Bay Chronicle, a fake newspaper. In 2024, The South Bay Chronicle published articles attacking San Jose, California representative Zoe Lofgren and promoting one of her challengers, Charlene Nijmeh.

== Operation ==
In 2019, the Buffalo Chronicle claimed to have "never been sued for defamation or any other matter" or received a cease and desist letter. Prior to the 2019 Canadian federal election, the website ran paid Facebook advertisements to promote two dubious stories about Justin Trudeau, despite the website's content being repeatedly debunked by news organizations.
