= NASA marijuana experiments hoax =

2016–2018 internet hoax

The NASA marijuana experiments is a 2016–2018 internet hoax purporting to document NASA's payment of $18,000 to volunteers to conduct bed rest experiments where they were furnished with marijuana to smoke during the experiment. NASA confirms that bed rest experiments were conducted, but never involved marijuana. Facebook refuted the viral story as part of its efforts to combat fake news.

The hoax may have been spun from a real 2014 news story by VICE columnist Andrew Iwanicki in which he documented his experience as a NASA bed-rest test subject.

== See also ==
- International Space Station cannabis experiment hoax
- List of cannabis hoaxes
