= List of United States politicians who have acknowledged cannabis use =

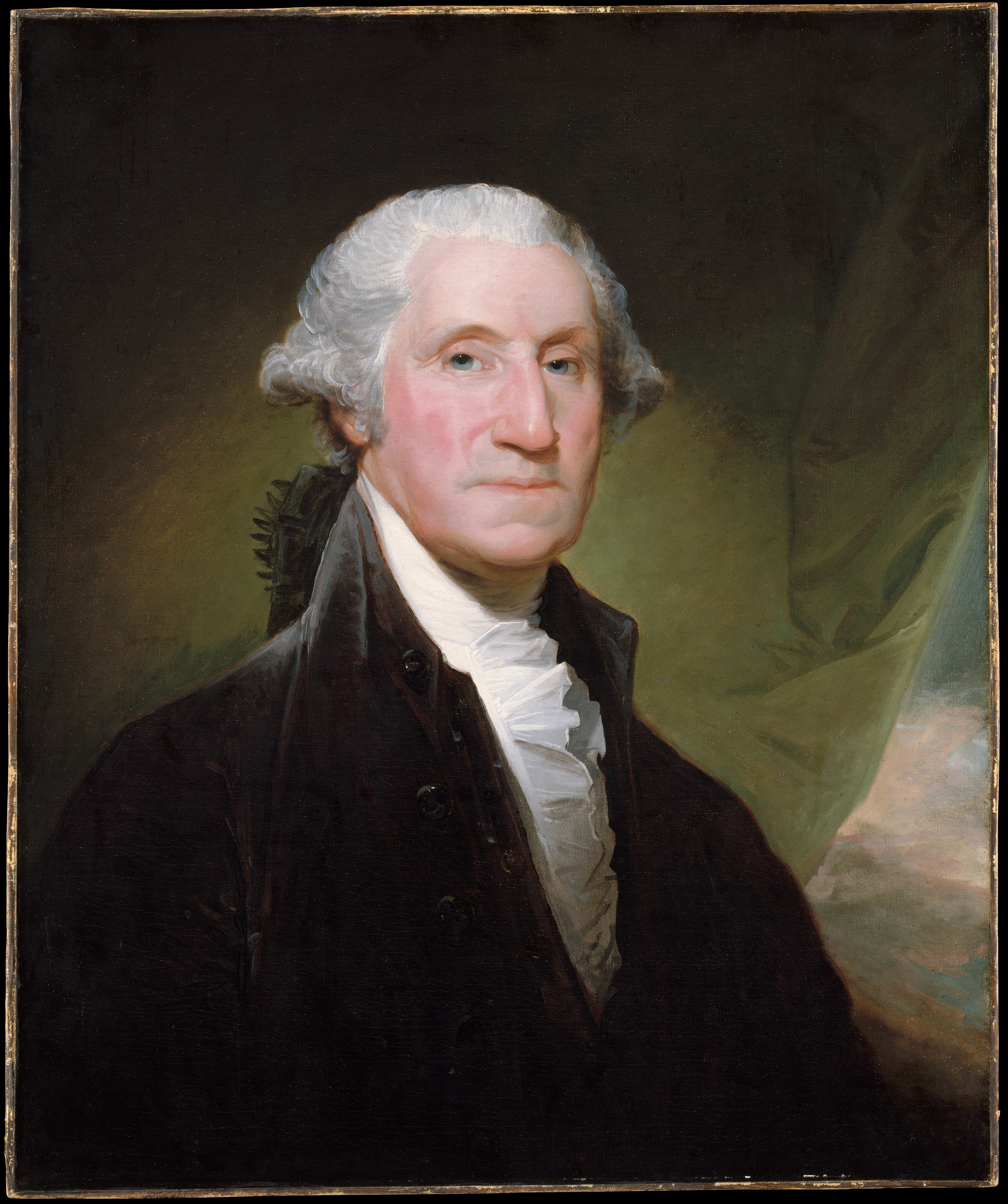
George Washington, the first president and one of the Founding Fathers, was known to have grown hemp.

Before the prohibition of cannabis in the United States, some of the nation's Founding Fathers and presidents grew hemp. Politicians who have admitted to recreational use of the drug prior to its decriminalization or legalization include mayors, governors, members of the U.S. Congress, vice presidents and presidents.

== Background ==
In the United States, cannabis was initially grown for industrial reasons, though it quickly became a staple medicinal product in the early 19th century and recreational use became more prevalent during the 20th century. Harry J. Anslinger, the commissioner of the Federal Bureau of Narcotics, responded to political pressure to ban marijuana at a nationwide level. The Marihuana Tax Act of 1937 created an expensive excise tax, and included penalty provisions and elaborate rules of enforcement to which marijuana, cannabis, or hemp handlers, were subject. Mandatory sentencing and increased punishment were enacted when the U.S. Congress passed the Boggs Act of 1951 and the Narcotics Control Act of 1956.

During the counterculture of the 1960s, attitudes towards marijuana and drug abuse policy changed as marijuana use among "white middle-class college students" became widespread. In Leary v. United States (1969), the U.S. Supreme Court held the Marihuana Tax Act to be unconstitutional since it violated the Fifth Amendment. In response, Congress passed the Controlled Substances Act as Title II of the Comprehensive Drug Abuse Prevention and Control Act of 1970, which repealed the Marihuana Tax Act. In 1972, the National Commission on Marijuana and Drug Abuse concluded that marijuana should be decriminalized, but that public use and driving while intoxicated should remain illegal. By the end of the decade, several states had decriminalized the drug, while many others weakened their laws against cannabis use.

A wave of conservatism during the 1980s allowed president Ronald Reagan to accelerate the war on drugs, prompting anti-drug campaigns such as the "Just Say No" campaign of first lady Nancy Reagan. Federal penalties for cultivation, possession, or transfer of marijuana were increased by the Comprehensive Crime Control Act of 1984 and the Anti-Drug Abuse Acts of 1986 and 1988. Since California voters passed the 1996 California Proposition 215, which legalized medical cannabis, several states have followed suit. However, United States v. Oakland Cannabis Buyers' Cooperative (2001) rejected the common-law medical necessity defense to crimes enacted under the Controlled Substances Act because Congress concluded that cannabis has "no currently accepted medical use" and Gonzales v. Raich (2005) concluded that the Commerce Clause of Article One of the U.S. Constitution allowed the federal government to ban the use of cannabis, including medical use. Today, cannabis remains classified as a Schedule III drug under the Controlled Substances Act, and possession is punishable by up to one year in jail and a minimum fine of $1,000 for a first conviction.

== List of politicians who farmed hemp ==
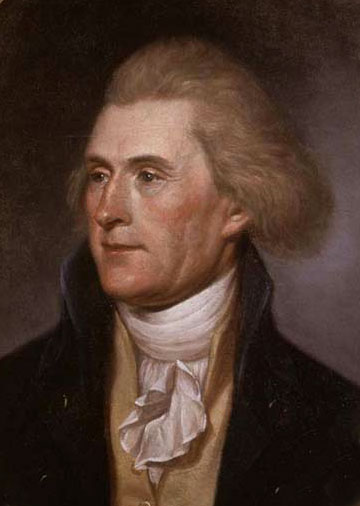
Thomas Jefferson, the third president

Name	Lifetime	Highest position	Party	Ref.
Benjamin Franklin	1706–1790	President of Pennsylvania	Independent	
Thomas Jefferson	1743–1826	President of the United States	Democratic-Republican	
James Madison	1751–1836	President of the United States	Democratic-Republican	
George Washington	1732–1799	President of the United States	Independent	
Henry Clay	1777–1852	United States Secretary of State, United States Senator Kentucky	Democratic-Republican, National Republican and Whig	

Parties

Democratic-Republican Whig Independent

== Use prior to decriminalization ==
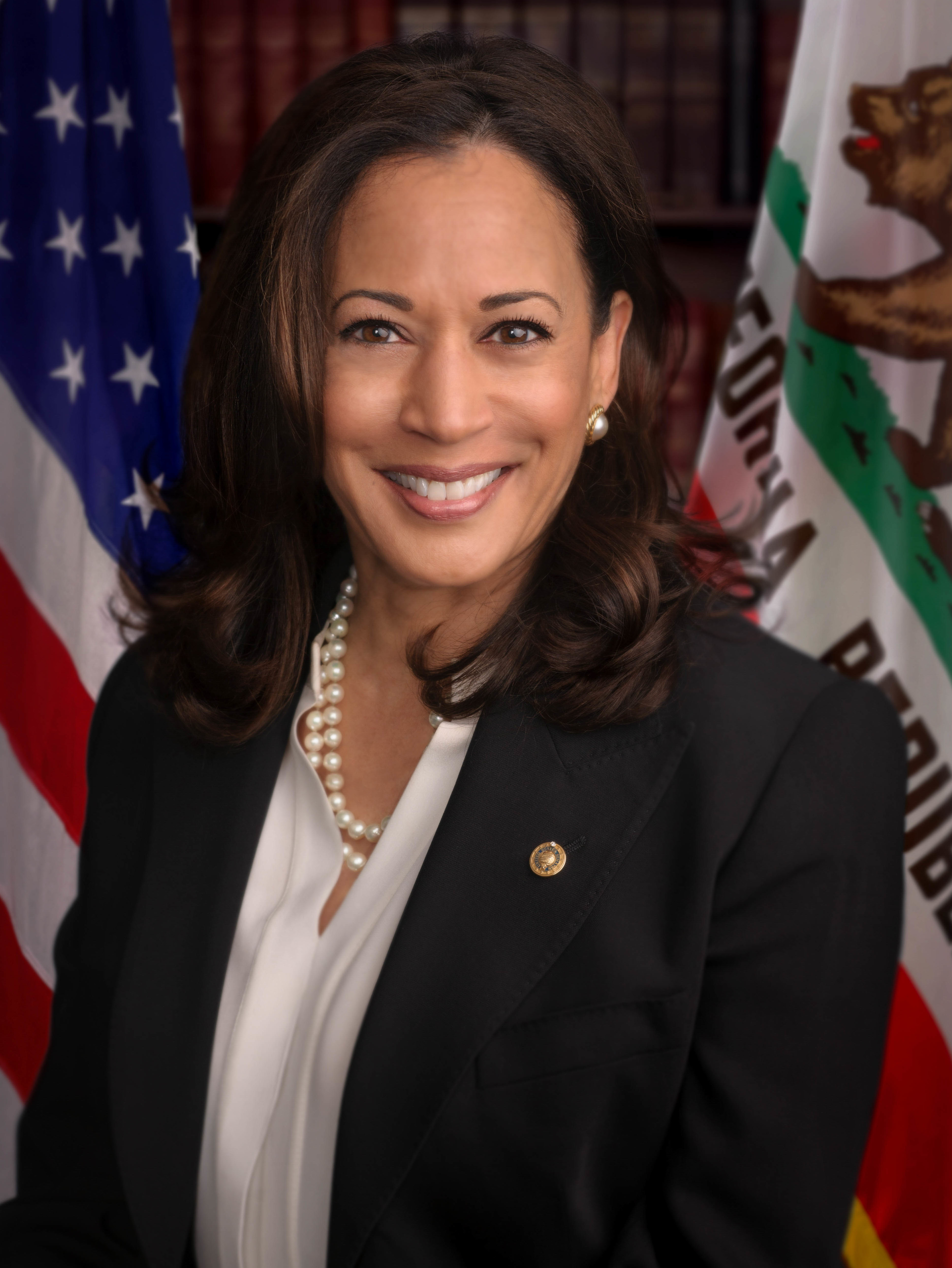
Kamala Harris, the 49th vice president

George W. Bush, the 43rd president

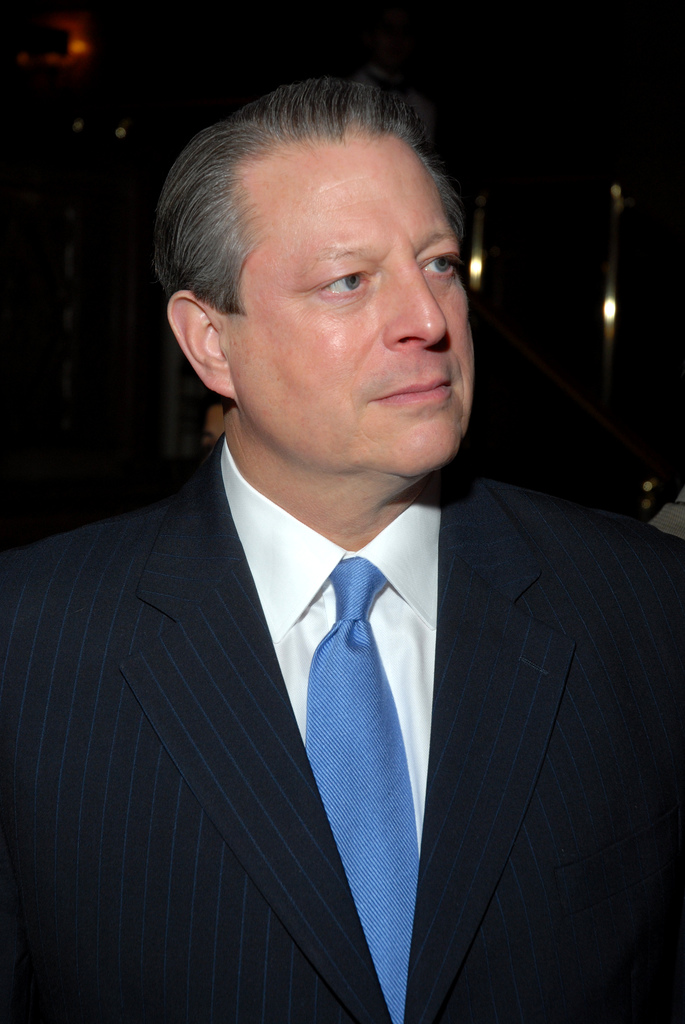
Al Gore, the 45th vice president

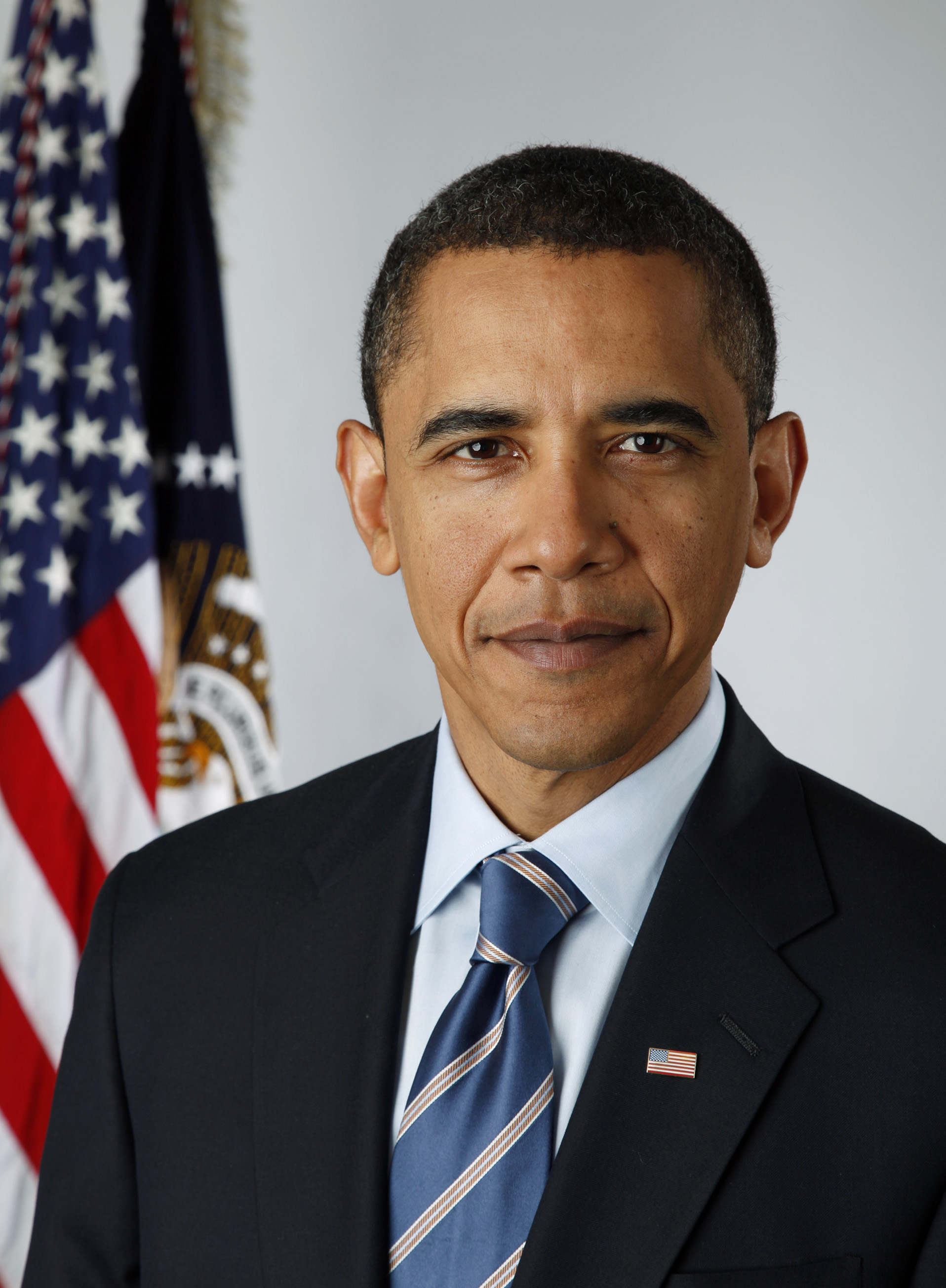
Barack Obama, the 44th president

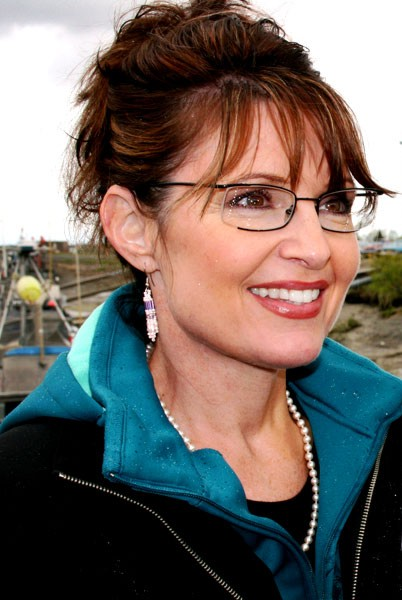
Sarah Palin, the 9th Alaska governor

Name	Lifetime	Highest position	Party	Ref.
Rob Astorino	b. 1967	County Executive of Westchester County	Republican	
Bruce Babbitt	b. 1938	Governor of Arizona, United States Secretary of the Interior	Democratic	
Michael Bloomberg	b. 1942	Mayor of New York City	Democratic	
Bill Bradley	b. 1943	United States Senator from New Jersey	Democratic	
George W. Bush	b. 1946	President of the United States	Republican	
Jeb Bush	b. 1953	Governor of Florida	Republican	
Pete Buttigieg	b. 1982	United States Secretary of Transportation	Democratic	
Paul Cellucci	1948–2013	Governor of Massachusetts	Republican	
Lincoln Chafee	b. 1953	United States Senator from Rhode Island, Governor of Rhode Island	Libertarian	
Lawton Chiles	1930–1998	United States Senator from Florida, Governor of Florida	Democratic	
Bill Clinton	b. 1946	President of the United States	Democratic	
Steve Cohen	b. 1949	United States Representative from Tennessee	Democratic	
Jack Conway	b. 1969	Attorney General of Kentucky	Democratic	
Ted Cruz	b. 1970	United States Senator from Texas	Republican	
Andrew Cuomo	b. 1957	Governor of New York	Democratic	
Bill de Blasio	b. 1961	Mayor of New York City	Democratic	
Howard Dean	b. 1948	Governor of Vermont	Democratic	
Joseph DeNucci	b. 1939	Auditor of Massachusetts	Democratic	
Mary Donohue	b. 1947	Lieutenant Governor of New York	Republican	
Shaun Donovan	b. 1966	United States Secretary of Housing and Urban Development	Democratic	
John Edwards	b. 1953	United States Senator from North Carolina	Democratic	
Newt Gingrich	b. 1943	United States Representative from Georgia	Republican	
Al Gore	b. 1948	Vice President of the United States	Democratic	
Kamala Harris	b. 1964	Vice President of the United States	Democratic	
Maggie Hassan	b. 1958	Governor of New Hampshire, United States Senator from New Hampshire	Democratic	
John Hickenlooper	b. 1952	United States Senator from Colorado, Governor of Colorado	Democratic	
Eric Holcomb	b. 1968	Governor of Indiana	Republican	
Gary Johnson	b. 1953	Governor of New Mexico	Libertarian	
Mondaire Jones	b. 1987	United States Representative from New York	Democratic	
John Kasich	b. 1952	Governor of Ohio	Republican	
Joseph P. Kennedy II	b. 1952	United States Representative from Massachusetts	Democratic	
John Kerry	b. 1943	United States Secretary of State	Democratic	
Ed Koch	1924–2013	Mayor of New York City	Democratic	
Richard Lamm	1935–2021	Governor of Colorado	Democratic	
Connie Mack III	b. 1940	United States Senator from Florida	Republican	
Kyle E. McSlarrow	b. 1960	United States Deputy Secretary of Energy	Republican	
John Miller	1938–2017	United States Representative from Washington	Republican	
Susan Molinari	b. 1958	United States Representative from New York	Republican	
Jim Moran	b. 1945	United States Representative from Virginia	Democratic	
Seth Moulton	b. 1978	United States Representative from Massachusetts	Democratic	
Evelyn Murphy	b. 1940	Lieutenant Governor of Massachusetts	Democratic	
Phil Murphy	b. 1957	Governor of New Jersey	Democratic	
Richard Neal	b. 1949	United States Representative from Massachusetts	Democratic	
Barack Obama	b. 1961	President of the United States	Democratic	
Sarah Palin	b. 1964	Governor of Alaska	Republican	
George Pataki	b. 1945	Governor of New York	Republican	
David Paterson	b. 1954	Governor of New York	Democratic	
Edward W. Pattison	1932–1990	United States Representative from New York	Democratic	
Claiborne Pell	1918–2009	United States Senator from Rhode Island	Democratic	
Rob Portman	b. 1955	United States Senator from Ohio, U.S. Trade Representative	Republican	
J. B. Pritzker	b. 1965	Governor of Illinois	Democratic	
Dana Rohrabacher	b. 1947	United States Representative from California	Republican	
Bernie Sanders	b. 1941	United States Senator from Vermont	Independent (Note: Congressional affiliation)	
Rick Santorum	b. 1958	United States Senator from Pennsylvania	Republican	
Arnold Schwarzenegger	b. 1947	Governor of California	Republican	
William Scranton III	b. 1947	Lieutenant Governor of Pennsylvania	Republican	
Kevin Stitt	b. 1972	Governor of Oklahoma	Republican	
Scott Stringer	b. 1960	New York City Comptroller	Democratic	
Bill Thompson	b. 1953	New York City Comptroller	Democratic	
Peter G. Torkildsen	b. 1958	United States Representative from Massachusetts	Republican	
Jesse Ventura	b. 1951	Governor of Minnesota	Independent	
Janet Yellen	b. 1946	United States Secretary of the Treasury	Democratic	

Parties

Democratic Republican Independent Libertarian

== See also ==
- List of British politicians who have acknowledged cannabis use
