= McDonald's urban legends =

There are multiple urban legends centering around the fast-food chain McDonald's. These legends include claims about the food and allegations of discrimination by the company.

== Unusual ingredients ==
Large companies have been the subject of rumors that they substitute unusual or unethical substances in their products, usually to decrease costs. McDonald's is not immune to such claims.

=== 100% Beef ===
An untrue but pervasive claim is that McDonald's buys its meat from a company called "100% Beef", making it possible for McDonald's to call beef by-products and soy products "100% beef".

=== Chayote as mock apple pie ===
In Australia, a persistent urban legend is that McDonald's apple pies were made of chokos (chayotes), not apples. This eventually led McDonald's to emphasise the fact that real apples are used in their pies. This legend was based on an earlier belief that tinned pears were often disguised chayotes. A possible explanation for the rumor is that there are a number of recipes in Australia that advise chayotes can be used in part replacement of canned apples to make the fruit go farther in making apple pies. This likely arose because of the economies of "mock" food substitutes during the Depression Era, shortages of canned fruit in the years following World War II, and the fact that apples do not grow in many tropical and subtropical parts of Australia, making them scarce. Chayotes, on the other hand, grow extensively in Australia, with many suburban backyards featuring chayote vines growing along their fence lines and outhouses.

=== Confectionery cheeseburgers ===
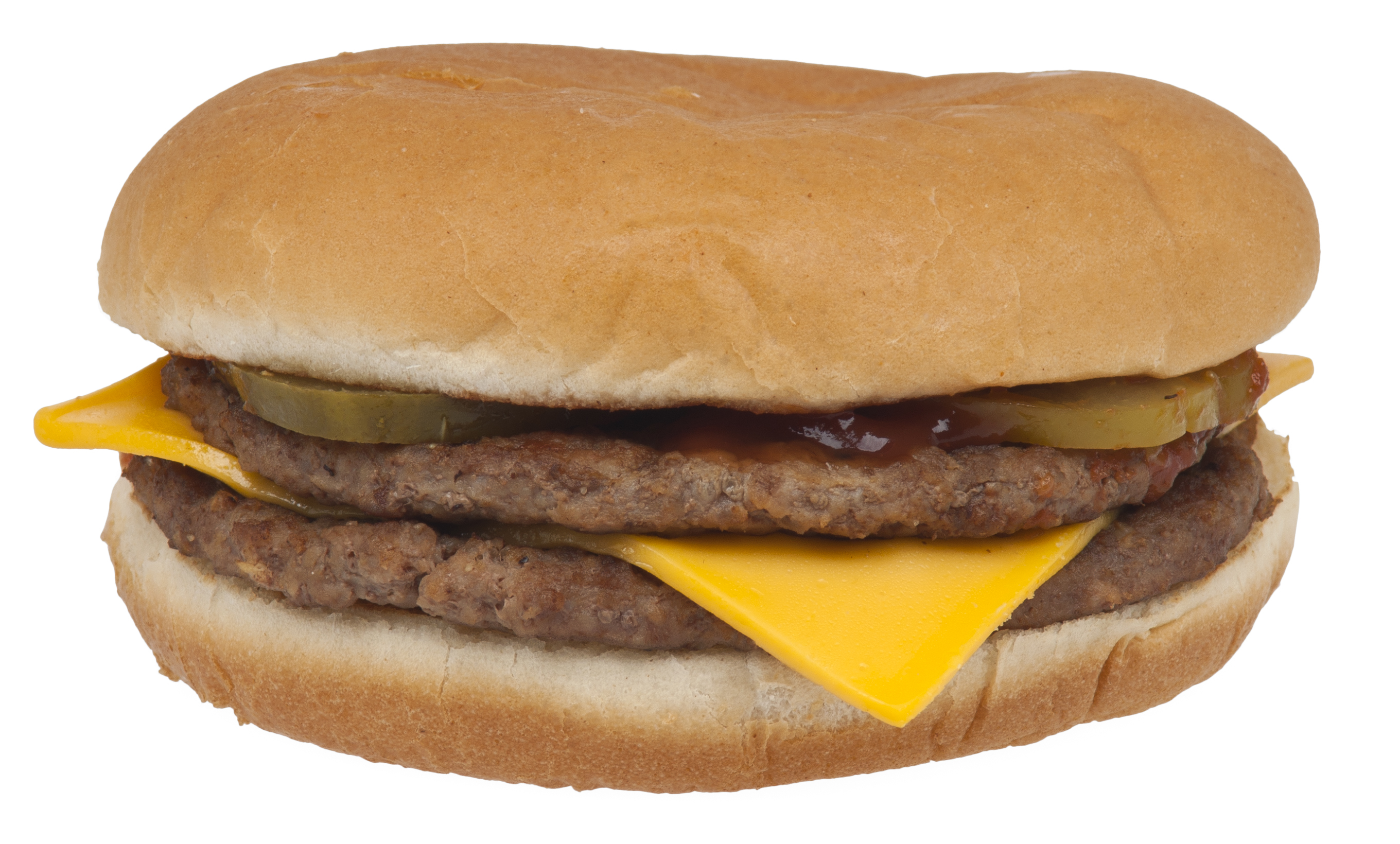
A McDonald's cheeseburger

One story claims that if McDonald's cheeseburgers did not include pickles as an ingredient, the cheeseburger would be classed as a confectionery item. It stems from the belief that the sugar content in the bun is high, but adding a pickle then keeps the overall sugar percentage below the threshold of what is classed as confectionery. McDonald's have stated that this story is an urban legend.

=== Cow eyeballs ===
One belief is that McDonald's uses cow eyeballs in its products, permitting it to brand them as "100% beef". However, the United States Department of Agriculture (USDA) mandates that all beef by-products, including cow eyeballs, be appropriately labeled. McDonald's has asserted that its products contain "100% pure USDA-inspected beef; no additives, no fillers, no extenders." In addition, cow eyeballs are actually more expensive than the more commonly eaten cow parts due to demand from scientific institutions for experiments.

=== Earthworms ===
Dating back to at least 1978, this rumor claims that McDonald's restaurants use earthworms in their hamburgers. This "worm-in-the-burger" rumor was originally attached to Wendy's burgers.

=== Human meat ===
A claim circulating since 2014, including in a video, is that McDonald's uses human meat in their hamburgers. The claim originates from a satire blog.

=== Mutant laboratory meat ===
Around March–April 2000, an internet rumor spread via e-mail in Brazil claimed that McDonald's meat was actually made from a genetically modified animal maintained in a laboratory, attributing the findings to the Michigan State University. The e-mail stated that the creatures kept were "figures without legs and without horns, which are fed through tubes connected to the stomach and which in fact have no bones, but a little cartilage that never develops", and "anyone who has seen them assures them that they are very unpleasant things, because in addition to remaining immobile all their 'life', they have no eyes, no tail and practically no fur; in fact the head is the size of a tennis ball".

The e-mail carries on saying that "some irreversible health damage can be done by eating this meat, resulting in diseases who manifest themselves in a way similar to AIDS, and have symptoms related to Alzheimer's disease" and ends encouraging the reader to boycott McDonald's until it sells actual beef. The urban legend has also been attributed to other fast-food chains and animal products, such as KFC and mutant chickens.

=== Pig fat ===
An unsourced claim is that McDonald's uses pig fat in its milkshakes, ice cream, and fried potatoes. McDonald's provides complete ingredient lists for all of its products on each of its regional websites: this includes unidentified fats within the ice cream used to make soft-serve cones and sundaes. The claim that McDonald's dairy products contain pig fat has been denied by the company on several occasions.

=== Pink slime ===
Around 2014, a photo of "pink slime" or "pink goop" was widely shared and claimed to be what Chicken McNuggets were made of. This has led to McDonald's Canada releasing a video showcasing how Chicken McNuggets are actually made in response.

== Cultural ==
=== Funding terrorism ===
In the late 1980s, rumors persisted in the United Kingdom that McDonald's was covertly funding the Provisional IRA, which was designated as a terror organization, via NORAID. The source of these rumors was eventually traced to a CNN talk show in which the company was praised for its generosity in providing funding for employees via Individual Retirement Accounts, or IRAs.

=== Racism ===
Rumors in 2011 proclaimed an image shows a McDonald's sign announcing a $1.50 surcharge for African-American customers. This was proven to be a hoax.

=== Drugs ===
Since 2015, fake news websites have purported that McDonald's restaurants in Colorado are converting children's playgrounds to lounges for on-premises cannabis consumption. The story was started on the fake news website Now 8 News.
