= Carrier pigeon cannabis delivery hoax =

Hoax and urban legend

A hoax circulated via the internet in 2025 claiming that carrier pigeons in New York City were photographed with orange backpacks carrying one gram of cannabis for delivery to consumers. After a week of media coverage including Time Out magazine, Brooklyn Eagle, the New York Post, High Times, and Good Day New York on WNYW, the New York City Fox Television affiliate, it turned out that a New York dispensary had instigated the hoax as a workaround for restrictive cannabis advertising laws.
