= Marlboro M hoax =

Hoax about marijuana cigarettes

Image of purported Marlboro M appearing on the Abril Uno satirical news site

The Marlboro M Hoax was a false rumor originating from satire news website Abril Uno in January 2014 and republished in March 2015. It was an April Fools prank.

== Hoax ==
The article claimed that Philip Morris USA, owner of the Marlboro tobacco company, was introducing a new line of marijuana cigarettes called Marlboro M in Colorado and the state of Washington. While fake, tobacco companies have shown interest in marijuana since the 1970's. Even though the article was satire, the clickbait title was able to make it around the internet quickly. Some users, upon discovering that there were no 'Marlboro M' cigarettes at their local dispensary, claimed that they would be in stock by the end of 2017.

== Basis ==
While the article was proven fake, its claims were able gain widespread belief because of past and current events in cannabis culture. For example, it is true that tobacco companies, including Phillip Morris, were interested in marijuana as a competing product and potentially investing in the cannabis industry, long before rapid legalization came about. Some tobacco companies have begun investing in medical marijuana research, as well as joining with marijuana seed investment firms. Legalization of cannabis in the United States and shifts in societal views on marijuana are also likely contributing factors to the wide acceptance these claims received. When the hoax appeared, it would have been illegal at the US federal level for a large company, such as Philip Morris, to introduce cannabis cigarettes across the country.
