= Pot brownies food stamps hoax =

Hoax and urban legend

A hoax and urban legend circulated the internet around 2014 claiming that marijuana brownies, commonly known pot brownies, could be purchased in Colorado with food stamps from the United States Department of Agriculture. Snopes.com debunked the hoax, stating that it originated with the satirical and fake news website National Report. The Department of Agriculture, part of the U.S. Federal government, treats cannabis as a Schedule I narcotic, not a food.
