= U.S. Constitution hemp paper hoax =

A hoax or urban legend states that the United States Constitution was originally written on hemp paper. According to National Constitution Center, this is not true, as the document was written on parchment. Some sources say that drafts of the document were or may have been written on hemp paper, (Note: Attributed to Jack Herer's 1985 book The Emperor Wears No Clothes) but this is also refuted by PolitiFact. Paper was typically made from mixed recycled fibers from old textiles, which included hemp but also linen, and cotton among other materials, rather than from a single plant source. The concept of "hemp paper" itself is therefore a very recent one.
