= Cannabis Sans Frontières =

Cannabis law reform organization

- Leader: Farid Ghehiouèche
- Founders: Farid Ghehiouèche
- Founded: 2005
- Headquarters: 38, rue Keller; 11th arrondissement of Paris
- Ideology: Pro-legalisation of cannabis and drug policy reform
- European affiliation: ENCOD, NORML France, FAAAT

Website
- cannabissansfrontieres.org

Cannabis Sans Frontières
- Abbreviation: CSF
- Ideology: Cannabis legalisation
- Colours: Green and white
- French National Assembly: 0 / 120

Cannabis Sans Frontières (English: Cannabis Without Borders) is a Paris-based organization advocating for cannabis and drug policy reform. Founded in 2005 by Farid Ghehiouèche and Michel Sitbon, the organization aims to destigmatize cannabis usage and influence legislative change both in France and Europe. Known for its multifaceted approach to advocacy, Cannabis Sans Frontières combines political engagement, public education, and cultural impact to push for more progressive drug policies. With a focus on human rights and harm reduction, the organization has gained visibility through its various campaigns, participation in elections, and frequent media appearances.

== Creation ==
Founded in 2005 by Farid Ghehiouèche and Michel Sitbon, Cannabis Sans Frontières has its headquarters at 38, rue Keller in the 11th arrondissement of Paris. Farid Ghehiouèche, the principal founder, has been an outspoken advocate for legal drug regulation, grounded in human rights, risk prevention, and harm reduction from narcotic substances. Michel Sitbon, an influential writer and activist, has contributed to various social causes, from freedom of expression to gender equality and the defense of migrants. The organization is a member of the pan-European network ENCOD and is affiliated in France with NORML France.

== Actions and mobilisations ==
The organization has been active in various areas since its inception. It has organized the Global Marijuana March in France since 2009. Moreover, they run support campaigns for prisoners of drug repression policies globally, including individuals like Michaël Blanc, Dana Beal, and Bernard Rappaz. They are also supportive of Cannabis Social Clubs in France, even publishing reports to bolster their cause. Recent news highlights their stance against extreme right-wing drug policies and involvement in cases related to money laundering in law enforcement.

== Political engagement ==
Their political footprint is not to be ignored. In 2009, they contested in the European elections, securing 0.14% of the votes. Farid Ghehiouèche attempted to run in the 2012 presidential elections but failed to secure the required 500 signatures. During this campaign, Ghehiouèche was arrested for contempt in Évry while reading an address to François Hollande and Manuel Valls. For this, he was sentenced to a suspended fine of 400 euros and 50 euros in damages to each of the three plaintiffs from the civil party—the insulted police officers. For the 2014 European elections, they presented a list titled "Cannabis sans frontières – Stop prohibition," led by Farid Ghehiouèche, in the Île-de-France – French from abroad constituency. This list obtained 0.23% of the votes cast. They are also active in parliamentary discussions related to cannabis legislation, notably through Senate and National Assembly hearings. Michel Sitbon, as the honorary president, has been a key figure in promoting their political agendas.

== Reception and cultural influence ==
The organization's cultural sway is significant. They are part of the Global Marijuana March, an annual international event since 1999, happening in over 700 cities and 65 countries. In France, activists gather yearly for the "Appel du 18 joint," a tradition since 1993. In the U.S., they've engaged in the "420 cannabis holiday," established to put pressure on Congress for marijuana legalization. Their influence is felt in the health sector as well, critiquing the inadequacy of drug prevention policies in France.

== See also ==
- Cannabis in France
