= Farid Ghehiouèche =

French cannabis activist

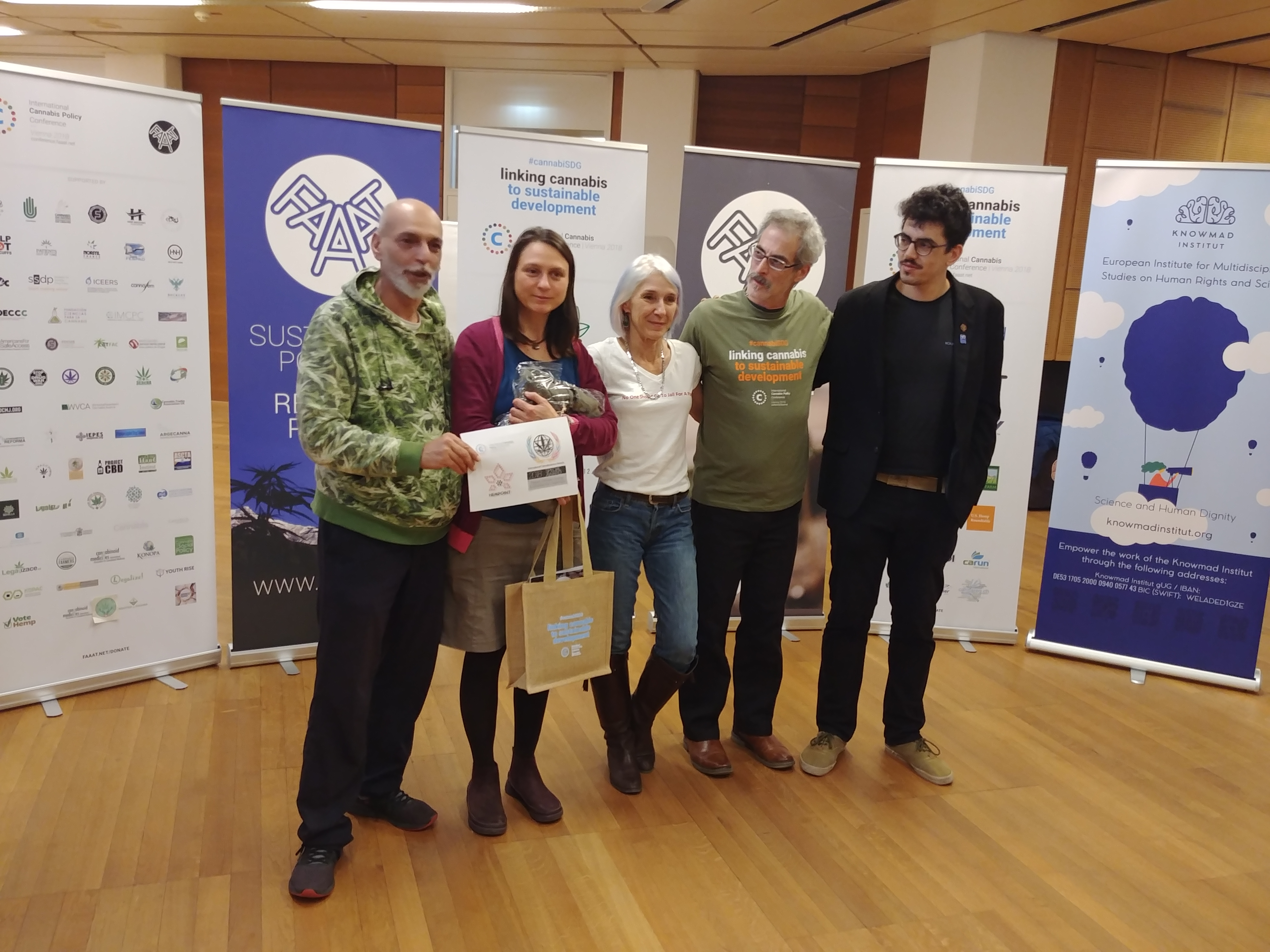
- Ghehiouèche (1st on the left) with FAAAT's leadership at the Vienna International Centre in 2018
- Born: 25 July 1971 (age 55); Chalon-sur-Saône, France
- Citizenship: France
- Occupation: Essayist
- Organization(s): ASUD, ENCOD, FAAAT, Info Birmanie, NORML France, Cannabis Without Borders
- Known for: Cannabis legalization
- Other political affiliations: Formerly: The Greens, Pirate Party
- Board member of: Board member: ENCOD, ASUD

Farid Ghehiouèche (born in 1971 in Villefranche-sur-Saône) is a French author, activist and politician, known for his involvement for cannabis and other drugs liberalization, and in pacifist, ecologist, freedom of speech, gender equality, right of asylum and prison abolition social movements. He has been active since the 1990s in France and in international organizations (European Union and United Nations).

Since 2023 he has been chairman of the non-governmental organization ENCOD and was selected as a member of the Standing Scientific Committee on Psychotropics, Narcotics and Addiction of the French Medicines Agency.

== Biography ==
From mixed French and Algerian descent, Farid Ghehiouèche was born on 25 July 1971 in the Ain region of France. He spent his early years between Jassans-Riottier (Beaujolais) and Coligny (Revermont), next to Bourg-en-Bresse, Mâcon and Chalon-sur-Saône, before moving to Paris in 1992.

As an activist Ghehiouèche started as coordinator of Info Birmanie (Info Burma) between 1993 and 2006 where he authored articles and books on the human rights situation in Myanmar, protesting in particular forced labour by the French oil company Total in the country. In parallel, he became active member of the French Green party, and was the party's coordinator on drug policies between 1998 and 2008.

On 1 May 1999 Ghehiouèche attended London's Million Marijuana March, after which he became involved in cannabis activism. Since the, Ghehiouèche has been involved with a number of associations and NGOs on the discussions around drug policy reform and drug-related harm reduction, in France and abroad. He has also worked on coca leaf reform issues.

Ghehiouèche also participated alongside Michel Sitbon in editing and printing houses Éditions du Lézard and Éditions Trouble-Fête and the associated Lady Long Solo library in Paris' 11th district, that he described as "a place of emulation where projects and ideas come together." In the 2010 he edited the free cannabis information magazine "RBH23". He was later involved in launching FAAAT's editions.

=== Electoral campaigns ===
In March 2008 Ghehiouèche ran for Mayor of Chalon-sur-Saône under the list "Chalon oxygene–liste verte et ouverte" for the Green party, obtaining 436 votes (2.61%).

After leaving the Green party in 2008, Ghehiouèche ran as candidate in several French and European elections, most often under his political platform Cannabis Without Borders (Cannabis sans frontières or CSF):

- Presidential elections:
  - In 2012 he attempted to run for President of France, but could not obtain the necessary supports required to file his candidacy.
- European Parliament elections:
  - In 2009, he headed the list "CSF–Mouvement pour les libertés" (movement for freedom), obtaining 4,015 votes (0.02%);
  - In 2014, he ran with the list "CSF–Stop la prohibition" (stop prohibition), obtaining 7,176 votes (0.23%).
- Legislative elections:
  - In 2012 he ran under the banner "FARID: Force Autonome de Résistance par l'Imagination et la Démocratie" (Force of Autonomous Resistance for Imagination and Democracy), obtaining 187 votes (0.42%) in Essonne's 8th constituency;
  - In 2017 he obtained 159 votes (0.42%) under the list of the French Pirate Party in the same constituency;
  - In the 2021 by-elections, he obtained 63 votes (0.54%) in Paris's 15th constituency.
- Regional elections:
  - In 2015, Ghehiouèche ran in the Île-de-France region as part of the list Fédération libertaire unitaire ouverte (FLUO) grouping the French Pirate Party, Cannabis without Borders, and other groups. The list obtained 797 votes (0.22%) in the Essonne department, where Ghehiouèche was running, and a total of 9,593 votes (0.3%) in the region.
- Primary election of the French Socialist Party:
  - In 2011, as a "pirate candidacy" where he proposed among other measures to turn the Élysée Palace into an hospital for medical cannabis patients. He obtained very few votes.

=== Public figure ===
In France, Ghehiouèche is a controversial public figure, often performing with cannabis plants or joints in public events or in television to generate public debate and controversy. As organizer of the Global Marijuana March in Paris since 2001, he has often been in confrontation with French authorities about the organization of this event due to a provision in French law (Article L. 3421-1 of the public health code) banning positive speech related to narcotic drugs, stating that the "provocation to commit the offence [of cannabis use], even if such provocation has not been followed up, or the fact of presenting these offences in a favorable light, shall be punishable by five years’ imprisonment and a fine of 75,000 euros"

Ghehiouèche has been defending the Spanish model of Cannabis Social Clubs in the media, at the French National Assembly and Senate, and at the UN on several occasions. Since 2023, he has been member of the Drugs Advisory Committee of the ANSM, the French Medicines Agency.

==== International advocacy ====
From 2003 onwards Ghehiouèche attended the United Nations Commission on Narcotic Drugs (CND) in Vienna, Austria, as part of different NGO delegations and as media reporter. He collaborated with organizations such as the Italian Transnational Radical Party, DRCNet Foundation, Society for Threatened Peoples, among others. He was involved in bringing drug policy reform figures to the United Nations such as Doug Fine or Dana Beal. His involvement led some like Sitbon top describe him as a "pioneer in legalization-related international relations."

Ghehiouèche has been particularly active at the UN and European Union levels through his involvement in the European Coalition for Just and Effective Drug Policies (ENCOD) since 2003. He was elected ENCOD's president in 2023.

In 2015 Ghehiouèche co-founded the think-tank FAAAT with activist Michael Krawitz among others, an NGO with which he was particularly involved in the World Health Organization and CND's processes of cannabis scheduling changes under the Single Convention on Narcotic Drugs.

==== Publications ====
Ghehiouèche co-authored several policy reports, scholarly papers, and books.
