= Drug den =

Drug den may refer to:

- Cannabis Social Club
- Drug house
- Opium den

== See also ==
- Acid Tests
- Rave
