= Cannabis classification in the United Kingdom =

Cannabis classification in the United Kingdom refers to the class of drugs, as determined by the Misuse of Drugs Act 1971, that cannabis is placed in. Between 1928 and 2004 and since 2009, it has been classified as a class B drug. From 2004 to 2009, it was a class C drug. At present, it is a class B, with very limited exceptions.

Drug policy (including Cannabis classification) has been a contentious subject in UK politics. A number of senior Scientific advisors have objected the transfer back to class B, notably Professor David Nutt and John Beddington considered the move politically motivated rather than scientifically justified.

== Transfer to class C ==
As Home Secretary in Tony Blair's Labour government, David Blunkett announced in 2001 that cannabis would be transferred from class B of the Act to class C, resulting in a penalty of up to 2 years in prison for possession. The penalty for possession would be up to 5 years in prison if it is decided that there was an intent to supply. Reclassification had the support of a plurality of the public, with surveys at the time finding that 49% of British adults supported cannabis decriminalisation, 36% were against, and 15% were undecided. The transfer eventually happened in January 2004, after class C penalties for distribution had been stiffened. The Advisory Council on the Misuse of Drugs had recommended such a reclassification as early as 1979, a view endorsed by the Runciman Report in 1999.

The change was designed to enable police forces to concentrate resources on other (more serious) offences, including those involving "harder drugs". The government stated that the reclassification of cannabis to class C had the desired effect, with arrests for cannabis possession falling by one third in the first year following, saving an estimated 199,000 police hours.

== Return to class B ==
Early in January 2006 Charles Clarke, the Home Secretary, said that on the basis of advice from the Advisory Council, a decision was made not to return cannabis to class B. However, during Prime Minister's Questions on 18 July 2007, Prime Minister Gordon Brown announced that the Home Secretary, Jacqui Smith, was reviewing again whether to return cannabis to class B status. On 7 May 2008, Smith confirmed that cannabis in the UK would again be classified as a class B drug, despite the Advisory Council's recommendation. On 26 January 2009, cannabis was reclassified as a class B drug. The reclassification of cannabis to a class B drug had been hinted at as early as 2005 by allies of Gordon Brown, on the election night in 2005, Ed Balls stated that cannabis and the war in Iraq were mistakes that the Labour party had to learn from.

== Potential increase to class A ==
In October 2022, it was reported by The Sunday Times that the UK's Home Secretary, Suella Braverman, was considering upgrading cannabis to a class A drug. This would place cannabis in the same category as heroin, cocaine and ecstasy. This would mean that the maximum penalty for possession of cannabis would increase from five years in prison to seven years in prison, and increase the penalty for supply and production of cannabis from 14-years in prison to life in prison. An increase in classification from class B to class A was called for by a group of Conservative Party police and crime commissioners at the 2022 Conservative Party conference. Peter Reynolds, the president of the organisation, Cannabis Law Reform (CLEAR), said the idea was "completely crazy" and expanded by saying:

The idea of doing more of the same as the past 50 years, which has quite obviously dramatically failed, is ridiculous. The only people who want this are ignorant politicians and the people who sell illegal drugs, I'm crystal clear about that.

== 2012 Home Affairs Committee consideration ==
In 2012 the Home Affairs Select Committee produced a report on the UK's drugs policies. The committee were split on whether to recommend reducing the classification of cannabis back to class C. A vote was held in committee on the inclusion of the following sentence:

We remain, however, of the view expressed in our predecessors' Report, namely that cannabis be reclassified from class B to C, and therefore regret the decision taken by the Government in 2008

— The House of Commons, 2012

The vote was tied, 3:3, and the chair, Keith Vaz MP, voted to keep the sentence in the report and therefore recommend reducing the classification.

== Medical cannabis ==
On Tuesday 10 October 2017 under the Ten Minute Rule the Legalisation of Cannabis (Medicinal Purposes) Bill was proposed by Paul Flynn, Frank Field, Caroline Lucas, Mary Glindon, Jeff Smith, Kelvin Hopkins, Crispin Blunt, Michael Fabricant, Martyn Day, Ronnie Cowan, Layla Moran, and Alistair Carmichael.

Rescheduling of cannabis and cannabis resin;(1) The Misuse of Drugs Regulations 2001 are amended as follows. (2) In paragraph 1(a) of Schedule 1, omit “Cannabis (not being the substance specified in paragraph 5 of Part 1 of Schedule 4) and cannabis resin”. (3) In paragraph 1 of Schedule 2, after “Bezitramide”, insert “Cannabis (not being the substance specified in paragraph 5 of Part 1 of Schedule 4) and cannabis resin”

The first emergency licence for cannabis oil was granted on 18 June 2018. The concession came after an epileptic child became severely ill after having his cannabis confiscated.

== See also ==
- Cannabis in the United Kingdom
- Drug liberalisation
- Drug policy of the United Kingdom
- Drug policy reform
- Drugs controlled by the UK Misuse of Drugs Act
- Effects of cannabis
- Legal and medical status of cannabis
- Legal issues of cannabis
- Legality of cannabis by country
- List of British politicians who have acknowledged cannabis use
- NORML UK
- Single Convention on Narcotic Drugs
- Wootton Report
