= Michel Sitbon =

French writer, publisher and journalist

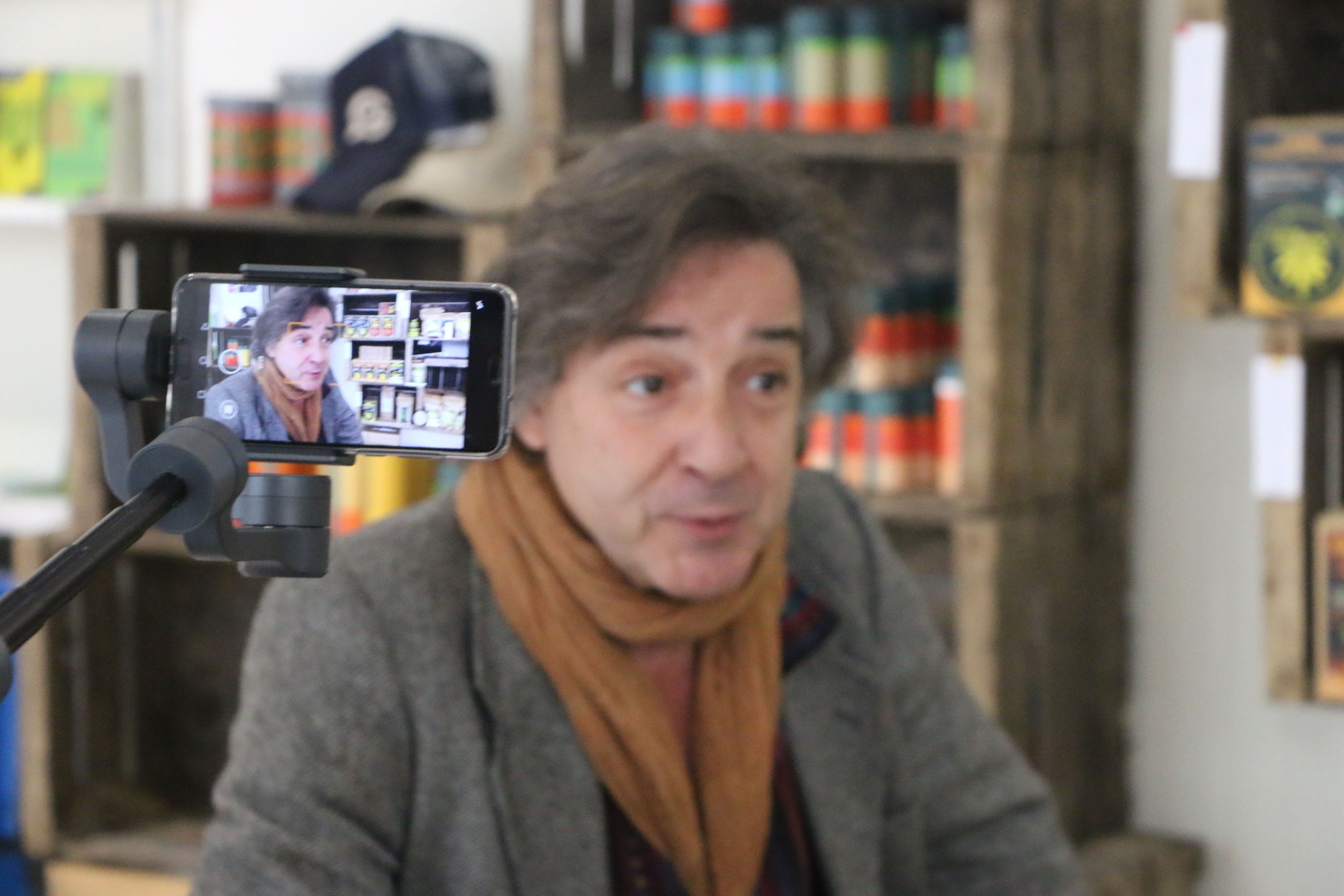
Michel Sitbon

Michel Sitbon (born in 1959 in Tunis) is a French writer, publisher and journalist. He founded many collectives and associations defending freedom of speech, gender equality, right of asylum or the legalization of cannabis. He is also one of the co-founders of the Nuit Rwandaise (Rwandese Night), a review of experts for the truth about the Rwandan genocide.

He notably stood out in 2017 by welcoming migrants every evening in his bookstore rue Keller in Paris, the facts reported by the media Brut are viewed several million times on social networks.

== Biography ==
Born in 1959 in Tunisia, Michel Sitbon comes from a family of journalists and writers, Guy Sitbon and Nicole Muchnik who officiated at the time as correspondents in the Maghreb and participated in the Maghreb Circus.

Very early politically committed to freedom of speech, Michel Sitbon joined his father to assume responsibility for the activities of erotic publications and pink messaging services in the early 1980s. This earned him particular competition with Xavier Niel at the 'era. This time of mobilization gives him the opportunity to question the policy of good morals which then restricted access to certain content, first in the press then by the minitel and finally via the Internet.

=== Cannabis legalization advocate ===
He also participates in the Cannabis Sans Frontières project, which presented a list in the European elections in Île de France in 2009 and 2014. He is currently Honorary President. In 2019, he co-founded the Legalize movement with Safia Lebdi and Farid Ghehiouèche. He thus wrote the central proposal of this transversal collective: Une légalisation du cannabis au niveau européen pour favoriser les défavorisés.

== Bibliography ==
- Plaidoyer pour les sans-papiers, Paris, L'Esprit frappeur, 1998. ISBN 978-2844050205
- Un génocide sur la conscience, Paris, L'Esprit frappeur, 1998. ISBN 2844050654
- 2 bis rue de Tourville, la sécurité militaire au cœur de la République, Paris, Aviso, 2011. ISBN 2844052479
- Mitterrand le cagoulard. Synarchistes et cagoulards, voyage aux sources de l'extrême-droite française, Paris, Aviso, 2012. ISBN 2844052460
- Rwanda, 6 avril 1994. Un attentat français ?, Paris, Aviso, 2012. ISBN 9782844052575
- La mémoire n, la synarchie aux sources du fascisme, Paris, Aviso, 2014. ISBN 1093453044
