= VMMA =

VMMA may refer to:

- Medialaan, or VMMa
- Veterans for Medical Cannabis Access, formerly known as Veterans for Medical Marijuana Access
