= From Prison to Revolt =

1973 book by Serge Livrozet

- Author: Serge Livrozet
- Original title: De la prison à la révolte
- Language: French
- Publication date: 1973
- Publication place: France

From Prison to Revolt is a 1973 book by Serge Livrozet, with a preface by Michel Foucault who characterizes it as "a philosophy of the people".

Arrested and tried, Livrozet was convicted of a crime against property. Through this partly autobiographical text, he highlights the social causes of delinquency, analyzing the prison from political, economic, and ideological points of view as an ex-prisoner. It has since been regularly republished.

== Background ==
Convicted on several occasions for various burglaries, Serge Livrozet was released from prison in 1972.

Partly writing in prison, he published his first book De la prison à la révolte début 1973.

Michel Foucault wrote the preface. The two men were among the founders of the Prisoners' Action Committee.

The preface presents the book as an "individual and strong expression of a certain popular experience and thought regarding the law and illegality. A philosophy of the people".

According to the former French police officer, Georges Moréas, this "first book, written in large part behind bars [...] shows the life circumstances, the series of events, that lead many individuals behind bars. In other words, there is not born criminal."

== Legacy ==
In February 2000, invited to a literary program for a new edition of his first book, Serge Livrozet reiterated his point: "Prison is the receptacle, the terminal of our unjust society. A place for the poor, where the excluded are excluded [...] I have always said that theft has allowed me to be at this table today. I was destined to suffer and die, perhaps win the lottery if I let myself be trapped. I am not proud, but I do not regret anything."

== Editions ==
- 1973, 1975, 1986, Mercure de France.
- 1999, L'Esprit frappeur
- 2000, L'Esprit frappeur

== See also ==
- Prison abolition

== Bibliography ==
- Bibliothèque nationale de France : De la prison à la révolte : essai-témoignage par Serge Livrozet; préface de Michel Foucault.
- Nouveau millénaire, défis libertaires : de la prison à la révolte, analyse sur 1libertaire.free.fr.
- "FROM PRISON TO REVOLT | Office of Justice Programs". www.ojp.gov.
- Christophe Soulié, Années 70 : contestation de la prison : l'information est une arme, Raison présente, n°130, 2e trimestre 1999, Prison et droits de l'homme, pp. 21–38.
