= Cannabis in the United Kingdom =

- United Kingdom (dark green)
- Medicinal: Legal (since 2018)
- Recreational: Illegal (Class B)
- Hemp: Legal

Legality of cannabis in Europe Legal for recreational use by adults Legal for medical use under certain conditions by adults Illegal

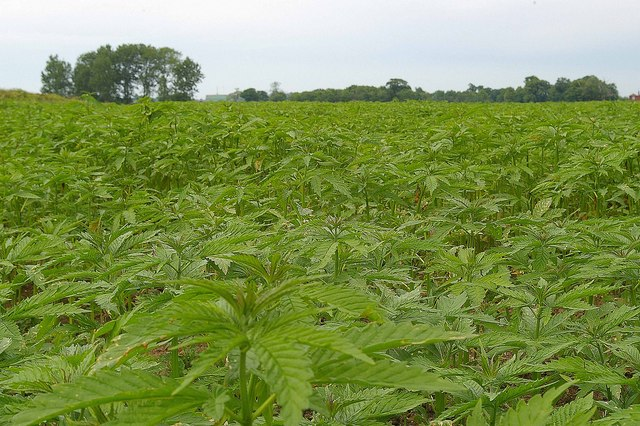
Industrial hemp farm outside Southminster

In the United Kingdom, cannabis (along with its psychoactive chemical compounds, such as THC) is illegal for recreational use and is classified as a Class B drug. Doctors can prescribe cannabis since medical cannabis was legalised in 2018. (Note: The NHS only prescribe it for rare and severe forms of epilepsy; as an antiemetic for people undergoing chemotherapy; and people who have stiffness and spasms from multiple sclerosis. Private doctors outside the NHS are allowed to prescribe it for any condition they feel it could help with.) People who possess less than 1 ounce (28 g) for personal use (and have no prescription) can be issued a nearly unique (only khat, containing cathinone, has a similar approach) cannabis warning, which does not go onto a permanent criminal record visible on a DBS check. (Note: Only the police and government would be able to see if someone was given a cannabis warning; an employer screening potential employees for crime would not be able to see it.)

In 2004, the UK made cannabis a Class C drug with less severe penalties, but it was moved back to Class B in 2009. Medical use of cannabis, when prescribed by a registered specialist doctor, was legalised in November 2018.

Cannabis is widely used as an illegal drug in the UK, while other strains lower in THC have been used industrially for over a thousand years for fibre, oil and seeds. Cannabis has been restricted as a drug in the UK since 1928, though its usage as a recreational drug was limited until the 1960s, when increasing popularity led to its stricter 1971 classification.

Despite the fact that cannabis is still illegal in the UK, with limited availability for medical use, as of 2016 the UK was the world's largest exporter of legal cannabis.

== History ==
=== Industrial use ===
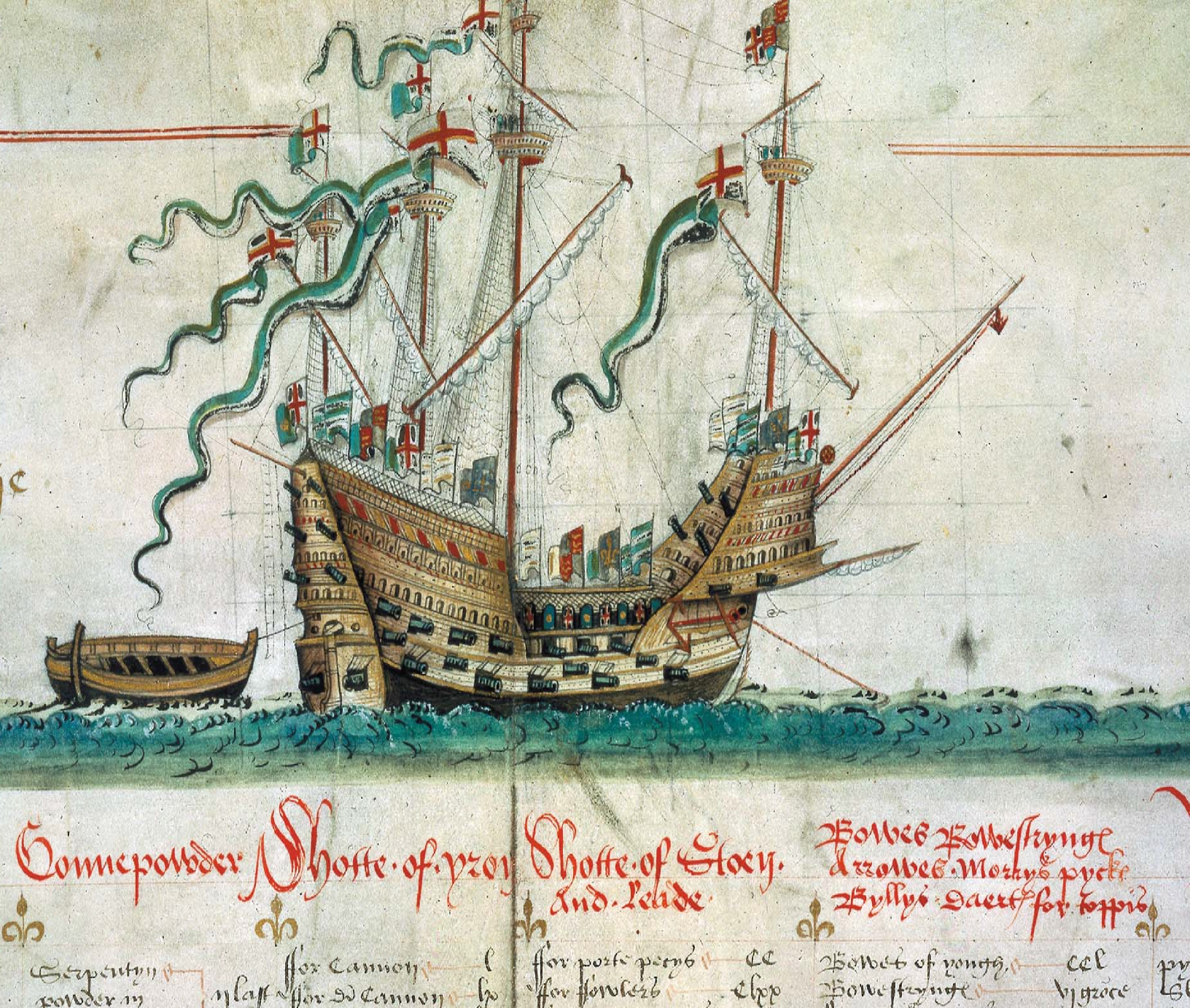
The Mary Rose needed tons of hemp.

The oldest evidence of cannabis in Britain was from some seeds found in a well in York; seeds found at Micklegate were associated with a 10th-century Viking settlement. Since it appears to have been mostly grown around the coastal areas it suggests the main reason for cultivating it was as a source of vegetable fibre which was stronger and more durable than stinging nettle or flax. This makes it ideal for making into cordage, ropes, fishing nets, and canvas.

With hempen ropes being fundamental to the success of the English Navy, King Henry VIII in 1533 mandated that landowners grow allotments of hemp; Elizabeth I later increased those quotas, and the penalties for failing to meet them. As fibre became more available and the growing of hemp became more widespread, people began to find many other uses for the crop. It became a very important part of the British economy. Eventually, demand had expanded to the point that the demand for more fibre was part of the driving force to colonise new lands. Thanks to its hardiness and ease of cultivation, it became an ideal crop to grow in the new British colonies. Moreover, the naval ships built to protect the new colonies and those built to bring the hemp back also increased demand, as much of their two hundred tonnes of ropes and sail cloth had to be renewed every two years.

Despite the introduction of cannabis prohibition in 1928, industrial hemp continued to have historical significance as a source of fibre for maritime and military applications. During the Second World War (1939–1945), shortages of imported materials renewed interest in domestic fibre production. The Cannabis Trades Association , in its historical review "A Century of Cannabis", describes a brief revival of hemp cultivation in the United Kingdom, with farmers encouraged to produce fibre for ropes, parachutes and other wartime supplies. Hemp had traditionally been used in naval rope, rigging and sailcloth, although its cultivation had declined as imported fibres became more widely available. Following the war, domestic hemp production declined further as alternative materials, including synthetic fibres, increasingly replaced traditional natural fibres.

=== Use as a drug ===
Cannabis gained new attention in the English-speaking Western medical world at the introduction of Irish physician William Brooke O'Shaughnessy, who had studied the drug while working as a medical officer in Bengal with the East India Company, and brought a quantity of cannabis with him on his return to Britain in 1842.

Use of psychoactive cannabis was already prevalent in some of the new territories that Britain added to its empire, including South Asia and Southern Africa. Cannabis as a drug also spread slowly in other parts of the Empire; cannabis was introduced to Jamaica in the 1850s–1860s by indentured servants imported from India during British rule of both nations; many of the terms used in cannabis culture in Jamaica are based on Indian terms, including the term ganja.

==== Prohibition ====
Cannabis prohibition began earlier in Britain's colonies than in Britain itself; attempts at criminalising cannabis in British India were made, and mooted, in 1838, 1871, and 1877. In 1894 the British Indian Hemp Drugs Commission judged that "little injury" was caused to society by the use of cannabis. Cannabis was banned in Mauritius in 1840, Singapore in 1870, Jamaica in 1913, East Africa Protectorate in 1914, and in Sierra Leone in 1920. In 1922, South Africa banned cannabis, and appealed to the League of Nations to include cannabis among prohibited drugs in its upcoming convention.

In Britain itself, in 1928 following its ratification of the Second International Opium Convention of 1925 (which required some limited controls over pure cannabis as a pharmaceutical ingredient, but not over prepared medications containing cannabis), the UK first prohibited cannabis as a drug, adding cannabis as an addendum to the Dangerous Drugs Act 1920.

Cannabis remained a fringe issue in the British public consciousness through the Interwar years and beyond, associated with society's margins: "coloured seamen of the East End and clubs frequented by Negro theatrical performers". This perception was strained by a 1950 police raid on Club Eleven in Soho which recovered cannabis and cocaine, and led to the arrest of several young white British men. With the changing youth and drug cultures globally, cannabis arrests increased dramatically in the UK: "from 235 in 1960 to 4,683 by the end of the decade, principally involving white middle class youths with no previous convictions". By 1973, cannabis possession convictions in the UK had reached 11,111 annually.

With the passage of the Misuse of Drugs Act 1971, cannabis was listed as a Class B drug. It remained Class B, except for the 2004–2009 period where it was classified as Class C, a lower punishment category, before being moved back to B.

== Cultivation ==
The UK produces cannabis for use as a drug in illegal facilities inside private houses or apartments. It is also produced on large scale for medical use. The medical production is so high that the UK is the highest exporter of cannabis in the world. After cannabis as a drug was rescheduled as Class B in 2008 (see below), more people started reporting on their suspicions of illegal operations and in 2009-2010 almost 7000 illegal facilities were found by police in one year. It has been reported that sometimes Vietnamese teenagers are trafficked to the UK and forced to work in these facilities. When police raid them, trafficked victims are typically sent to prison. Sometimes they are sent home.

== Usage ==
=== Recreational drug ===
Cannabis is widely used throughout the UK, by people of all ages and from all socio-economic backgrounds. In 2017, 7.2% of 16 to 59-year-olds reported using cannabis in the last year, making it the most commonly used illegal drug in the UK. The European drug report 2017 found that 29.4% of those aged 15–64 had used cannabis at least once.

=== Mental health concerns ===
In February 2015, a team of researchers at the Institute Of Psychiatry, King's College London, led by Dr. Marta Di Forti, found that use of high potency cannabis known as skunk increased the risk of psychosis by three times, compared to non-use. The study of 780 people also found the risk of psychosis was five times higher for those who used cannabis every day.

=== Industrial cannabis ===
Since 1993, the Home Office has been granting licences for the purposes of cultivating and processing cannabis. The UK government now provides free business advice and support services for growers and processors of cannabis for fibre. They can also issue licences for importing fibre in the form of hemp from abroad.

=== Animal feed ===
The plant itself has not been used as fodder as too much makes animals sicken, and due to its unpleasant taste they will not eat it unless there is no other food available. Hemp hurd, also called shives, is the soft core of the cannabis plant which remains after the fibres are removed, and provides good animal bedding which can absorb more moisture than either straw or wood shavings.

Boiled cannabis seed is frequently used by British sport fishermen.

== Legal status ==
=== Recreational use ===
Cannabis is illegal to possess, grow, distribute or sell in the UK. It is a Class B drug, with penalties for unlicenced dealing, unlicenced production and unlicenced trafficking of up to 14 years in prison, an unlimited fine, or both. The maximum penalty for possession of cannabis is five years in prison and an unlimited fine. A cannabis warning can be issued for small amounts (usually only up to 1 ounce (28 g)) of cannabis if it is found to be for personal use. This entails the police keeping a record, albeit one which carries no fine and does not show up on a standard DBS check (this means employers who want to check the criminal record of a potential employee will not see any cannabis warning).

Cannabis has remained a Class B drug since the 1971 Misuse of Drugs Act, except for a period from 2004 to 2009 during which it was classified as Class C, a lower punishment category. The 2004 reclassification (originally announced in 2001) removed the threat of arrest for possession of small amounts, for the purpose of allowing police to focus on harder drugs and violent crime. In May 2008, under the leadership of Prime Minister Gordon Brown, it was announced that cannabis would be moved back to Schedule B, against the recommendations of the Advisory Council on the Misuse of Drugs.

==== Enforcement ====
In the survey for the year ending March 2014, possession of cannabis offences accounted for 67% of all police recorded drug offences in the UK.

In 2015, County Durham police commissioner Ron Hogg announced that they would no longer be targeting people who grow cannabis for personal consumption, unless they are being "blatant". Derbyshire, Dorset and Surrey police announced that they would also be implementing similar schemes. The move was in response to significant budget cuts, which meant that police forces were having to prioritise more pressing areas. The presence of Teesside Cannabis Club is tolerated by police in Stockton-On-Tees.

According to figures obtained through a Freedom of Information request, there are large differences by county regarding how many cases actually result in an offender being charged. In 2016, Hampshire police had the most charges at 65%, while Cambridge had the lowest proportion of charges at only 14%.

=== Medical use ===
Medical use of cannabis under certain conditions was legalised in the UK on 1 November 2018, after the cases of two epileptic children who benefited from using cannabis brought increased public attention to the issue. The children (Billy Caldwell, 12, and Alfie Dingley, 6) both experienced significant improvement in their conditions after they began using cannabis, but were initially not allowed to continue their treatment under UK law. This led to increased public outcry, particularly in the case of Billy Caldwell who was hospitalised with life-threatening seizures after his medication was confiscated by authorities.

On 20 June 2018, then Health Secretary Jeremy Hunt announced his support for the medical use of cannabis and that a review would be undertaken to study changes to the law. On 26 July 2018, Home Secretary Sajid Javid announced that cannabis products would be made legal for patients with an "exceptional clinical need", and that cannabis would be moved from a Schedule I classification to Schedule II. On 11 October, the new provisions were officially presented and accepted in the House and the policy came into effect on 1 November 2018.

A licence is available from the home office to import prescribed medicinal cannabis. The first private, stand-alone Care Quality Commission (CQC) registered cannabis clinic was opened by Sapphire Medical in December 2019, since then a number of private clinics have opened across the UK. The UK's first medical cannabis registry set up and run by Drug Science charity was launched in August 2020. It is the biggest observational medical cannabis study in the UK with over 3,500 patients. The first UK medical cannabis study to receive approval from the MHRA ethics committee (REC) was titled CANPAIN feasibility study (evaluating the feasibility of undertaking a pragmatic real-world trial investigating CBMP in chronic pain patients). It was approved under IRAS project ID 304548 and will be conducted in the UK by LVL Health.

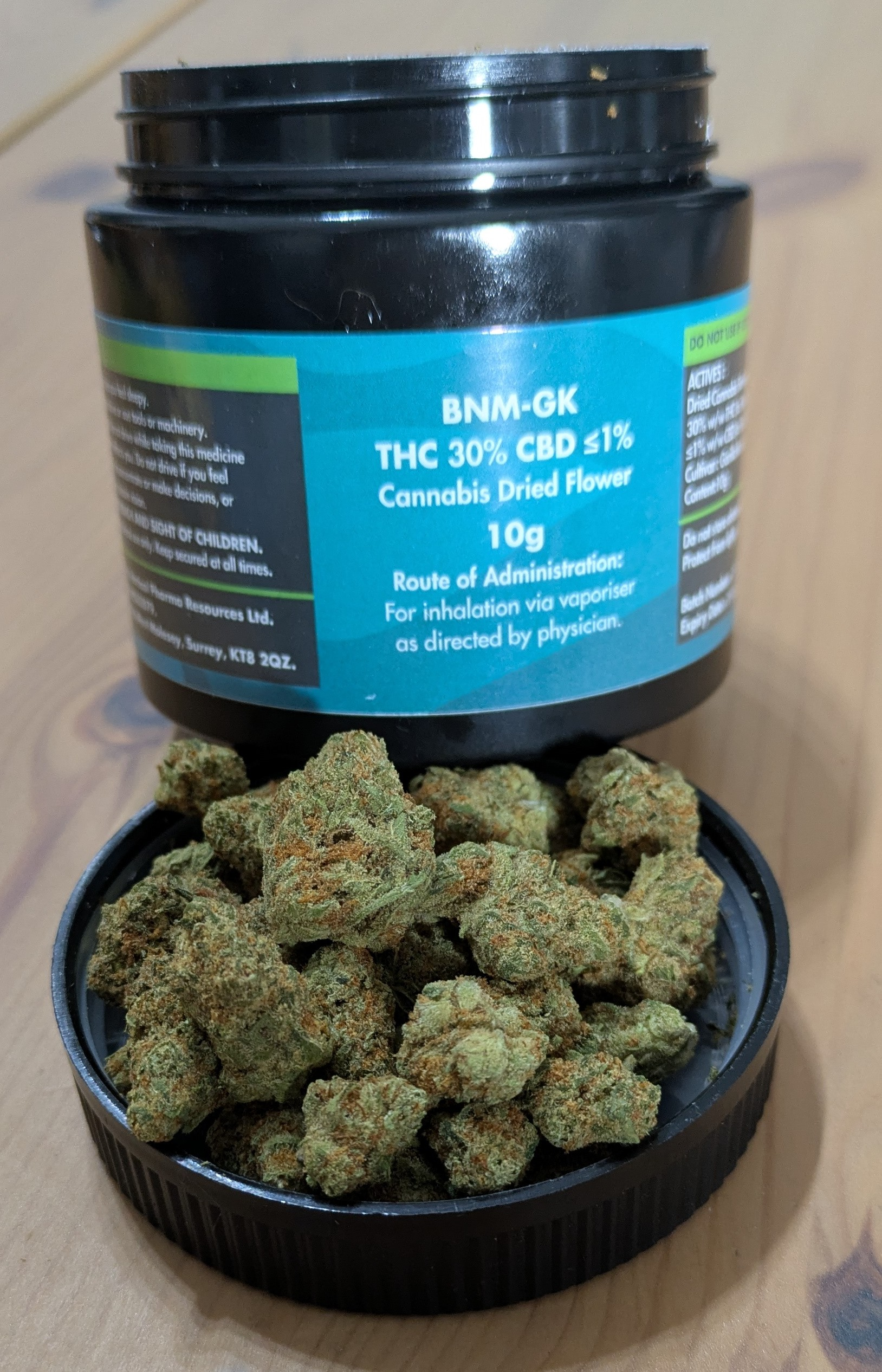
Medical cannabis flower prescribed in the UK

Treatment must be initiated by a specialist consultant and may be continued under a shared care agreement by a GP or non-medical prescriber. NHS guidance states that medical cannabis should only be prescribed when there is clear published evidence of its benefit and other treatment options have been exhausted. As these prescriptions are only offered through private clinics concerns have been raised about the costs to patients.

Sativex is an approved cannabis-derived medicine and is indicated for the treatment of spasticity caused by multiple sclerosis. Nabilone is another cannabinoid drug that has been approved by the Medicines and Healthcare products Regulatory Agency (MHRA) to treat nausea and vomiting caused by chemotherapy. Nabilone is a synthetic form of THC and not naturally derived from the plant.

Cannabidiol (CBD) oil is legal for use and sale in the UK without a prescription, as long as when it is sold to the public it is not sold as medicine. The CBD drug Epidiolex is approved for use in the EU and can be prescribed on the NHS for children and adults with rare forms of epilepsy such as Lennox-Gastaut syndrome, Dravet syndrome and tuberous sclerosis complex (TSC).

On 31 October 2020, it was reported that the NHS has been repeatedly refusing to fund medical cannabis for children with severe epilepsy. It was reported that at least twenty families are paying for private prescriptions after not being provided by the NHS. One family reported paying £2,000 a month for their 11-year-old daughter, who had been having up to 300 seizures a day. Doctors put her into an induced coma and transported her to intensive care. After an anonymous donation was given to one of the child's parents of £2,500, the parent bought cannabis oil for their child, who after taking it was allowed home within two days. The Department of Health and Social Care said more research is needed before it can routinely prescribe cannabis-based medicines. Peter Carroll of the campaign group End Our Pain said there are dozens more families in a similar position or unable to pay for the drugs at all.

=== Overseas territories ===
Medical use of cannabis was legalised following a ruling by the Supreme Court of Bermuda in 2016.

In 2016, the governor of the British Overseas Territory of the Cayman Islands approved a change to the Misuse of Drugs Law to allow the importation and use of CBD oil for medical purposes.

=== Crown dependencies ===
==== Channel Islands ====
Current laws allow the sale of cannabis edibles on the island of Sark, which are also exported to dispensaries in Jersey and Guernsey. There is no legal minimum age for cannabis as there is low level of regulation, however most dispensaries only sell to customers over 18.

Medicinal cannabis was legalised in 2019. There are cannabis clubs where people may consume cannabis onsite after showing ID and proof of prescription.

==== Isle of Man ====
Medicinal cannabis was legalized following the shift in policy in the United Kingdom. There are currently three licensed pharmacies that can prescribe and dispense medicinal cannabis. Prescriptions are only valid for 28 days and it is considered a private service where patients must pay. Recreational cannabis remains illegal.

== Advocacy for law reform ==
A number of organisations have been established in the United Kingdom with the aim of seeking regulatory and policy changes relating to cannabis and cannabis-based products.

- Cannabis Industry Council
- Cannabis Trades Association
- CLEAR (Cannabis Law Reform)
- Drug Equality Alliance (DEA)
- The Cannabis Pages
- NORML UK (Cannabis legislation reform)
- Transform Drug Policy Foundation
- UKCSC – United Kingdom Cannabis Social Club
- The Medical Cannabis Patients Association (MCPA)

While serving as a member of the opposition in the House of Commons, David Cameron sat on the Home Affairs Select Committee and voted in favour of a motion calling on the government to initiate discussions within the United Nations on alternative approaches to addressing the global drug problem, including the possibility of legalisation and regulation.

In June 2010, it was reported that the Home Office had sought to avoid complying with a Freedom of Information request in order to prevent scrutiny of gaps in the evidence base underpinning its drug policy.

In 2011, the Global Commission on Drug Policy, backed by Richard Branson and Judi Dench called for a review. The Home Office response on behalf of the Prime Minister was: "We have no intention of liberalising our drugs laws. Drugs are illegal because they are harmful—they destroy lives and cause untold misery to families and communities".

In 2012, a panel of MPs, as well as deputy prime minister Nick Clegg, recommended that drug policy be reformed, as the current policy did not adequately deal with the problem. Cameron rejected the idea, conflicting with comments he made in 2005 while competing for Conservative Party Leadership.

In 2015, James Richard Owen, an economics student at Aberystwyth University, started a petition on the UK Government's official petitions website calling for the legalisation of the cultivation, sale and use of cannabis. By 28 September 2015, the petition had gathered 218,995 signatures, exceeding the 100,000 signature threshold required for a petition to be considered for a parliamentary debate. The petition was debated in Parliament on 12 October 2015.

A study published in March 2016 said that legalising cannabis in the UK would raise up to one billion pounds in tax a year and reduce the harm done to users and society. The study was carried out by a panel of experts including scientists, academics and police chiefs. It recommended legalising cannabis for over 18s, which could legally be purchased from licensed single-purpose stores. It also recommended that home-cultivation of cannabis should be legal for personal use and small-scale licensed cannabis social clubs should be legally allowed to be established. Under its recommendations, the price, potency and packaging of all sold cannabis would be controlled by the Government with a new regulator established to oversee the market, possibly modelled on Ofgem and Ofwat and drug production and sales would be taxed, raising, the panel claims, between £500m and £1bn a year. Estimates by other reports have placed the value of a legalised cannabis market in the UK at between £1 billion to £3.5 billion and have said that it could cut costs across the justice system and become a job creator.

In March 2016, the Liberal Democrats became the first major political party in the UK to support the legalisation of cannabis. The Green Party also support a legal and regulated cannabis market.

In early 2018, the Institute of Economic Affairs (IEA) published a report looking at the size of the UK cannabis market and the potential implications of legalisation. The report concluded that the then-current UK cannabis black market was worth over £2.5bn and cannabis tax yields could potentially be between £204 million and £571 million. The recommendation from the IEA was that if cannabis was legalised, the duty rate should not be too high, as high tax would make retail prices less competitive and could prevent significant shrinkage of the black market. Advocates of legalisation said that the legalisation of cannabis would take away sales and control from criminal gangs in favour legitimate and regulated businesses. Proponents of legalisation have argued that regulation would ensure cannabis meets defined quality and purity standards, and that a minimum age requirement for purchase, possession and use would help limit access by young people.

The head of lifestyle economics at the IEA described legalisation of cannabis as a "win-win-win", noting: "Criminals lose a lucrative industry, consumers get a better, safer and cheaper product and the burden on the general taxpayer is reduced".

In December 2021, then Lord Mayor of Belfast and Belfast City councillor for the Alliance Party of Northern Ireland, Kate Nicholl, publicly called for the legalisation of cannabis. She also called for the opening of supervised injection sites in Belfast.

== Public opinion ==
A survey conducted by Hanway and Savanta ComRes between 24 February and 14 March 2022 interviewed a nationally representative sample of 9,043 adults aged 18 and over across several European countries, including the United Kingdom. Among UK respondents, 55% supported legal and regulated cannabis sales to adults aged 18 and over, 27% were opposed, and 16% expressed neither support nor opposition. Across all eight European countries surveyed (France, Germany, Italy, Spain, the Netherlands, Portugal, Switzerland, and the United Kingdom) 55% of respondents supported legal and regulated cannabis sales to people over 18.

A poll of 2,533 adults conducted in 2025 by YouGov also showed that 55% of the adults surveyed supported some form of cannabis reform. 33% of those asked supported continued criminalisation while 12% answered they didn't know.

== See also ==
- Adult lifetime cannabis use by country
- Annual cannabis use by country
- Drug policy of the United Kingdom
- Drugs controlled by the UK Misuse of Drugs Act
- Legality of cannabis
- List of British politicians who have acknowledged cannabis use
- List of cannabis rights leaders from the UK
- Release (agency)
