= Runciman Report =

The Runciman Report was published by in 2000 by the UK policing think tank the Police Foundation which hosted an inquiry into the United Kingdom's Misuse of Drugs Act 1971 (MDA). The report was authored by Viscountess Ruth Runciman.

== Recommendations ==
It called for the classification system to be more closely based on the scientific evidence of relative harm and consequently that cannabis should be reclassified from Class B to Class C. This was on the grounds that making cannabis possession a non-arrestable offence would reduce the number of "otherwise law-abiding, mainly young people" being criminalised and potentially receiving a custodial sentence to the detriment of their futures (p 7). It was also perceived that this could remove a source of friction between the police and the wider community and that this would free up police time (Monaghan 2008: 213). It also argued for the reclassification of LSD and MDMA from Class A to Class B and a reduction in the maximum sentence for possession of Class As, from seven years to twelve months. Lady Runciman's report also recommended the creation of a new offence of drug dealing.

== See also ==
- Cannabis in the United Kingdom
- Cannabis Law Reform
- Cannabis rescheduling
- Drug policy reform
- Legality of cannabis
