= Forum Drugs Mediterranean =

Global think tank on drug policy reform

- For Alternative Approaches to Addiction, Think & do tank (FAAAT think & do tank)
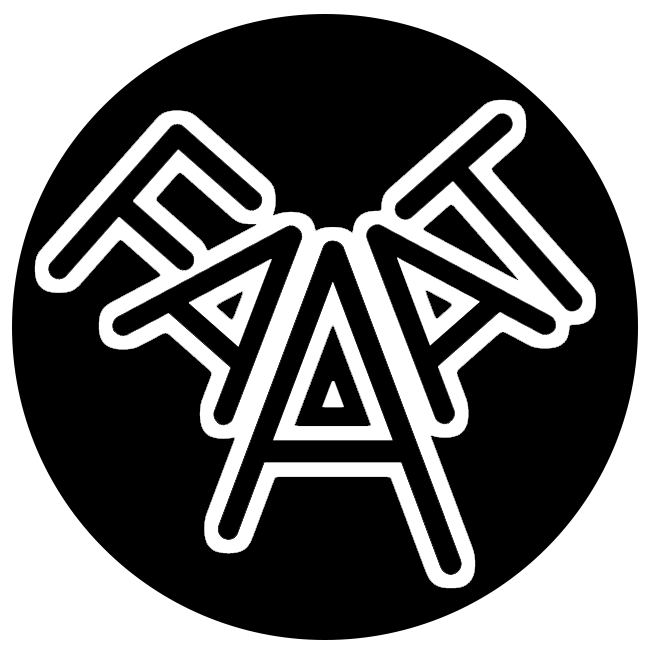
- Founded: February 2016
- Founders: Farid Ghehiouèche, Kenzi Riboulet Zemouli, Michael Krawitz
- Legal status: Non-profit organization
- Purpose: Reform of drug and substance use-related policies
- Location(s): Paris, France; Barcelona, Spain
- Origins: Launched by NORMLfr, VMCA & ENCOD
- Region served: Worldwide
- President of the board: Kenzi Riboulet-Zemouli
- Main organ: Permanent Committee
- Website: www.faaat.net

Forum Drugs Mediterranean (up to 2023, known as FAAAT think & do tank: "For Alternative Approaches to Addiction, Think & do tank") is an international non-profit organization working on drug policy, created in 2015 and based in Paris, France.

The organization focuses on research and advocacy related to policy alternatives in the field of addiction, drug use and substance abuse, claiming to foster civil society participation in policymaking at the international level. According to its mission statement, FAAAT supports "Transparent and measurable drug policies framed by fundamental rights, grounded on sustainable development, enforcing empowerment, social justice and health" and "supports the development of a legally controlled market for cannabis." The organization is present at both the local and international levels.

== Background ==
FAAAT's vision is that, from the local up to the international level, public policies related to controlled drugs should be transparent and measurable, framed by the Fundamental human rights of citizens, grounded on sustainable development, and that can empower the whole society while enforcing social justice and protecting health. The organization's think-tank researches policy alternatives to the current prohibition of drugs. Its do-tank organizes social engineering, collective action and advocacy for ground-up reformer stakeholders.

The project started in August 2015, and the organization was legally registered in February 2016 by drug policy reform advocates from the French chapter of NORML, the European Coalition for Just and Effective Drug Policies, and the US Veterans for Medical Cannabis Access who had been previously operating at United Nations' Commission on Narcotic Drugs meetings. The organisation collaborates with a network of experts, contributors, professionals and various stakeholders, holds conferences during the Commission on Narcotic Drugs, organizes exhibits, and other advocacy activities.

== Do-tank: Advocacy programs and actions ==
The organization claims two goals are structuring its actions (the so-called do-tank), "take action to ground the updates of international drug policy on sustainable development, human rights, transparency, and inclusiveness" and "strengthen peer groups, social movements and the nonprofit sector to increase knowledge, sustainability, effectiveness, and capacity for collective action on drug-related issues."'

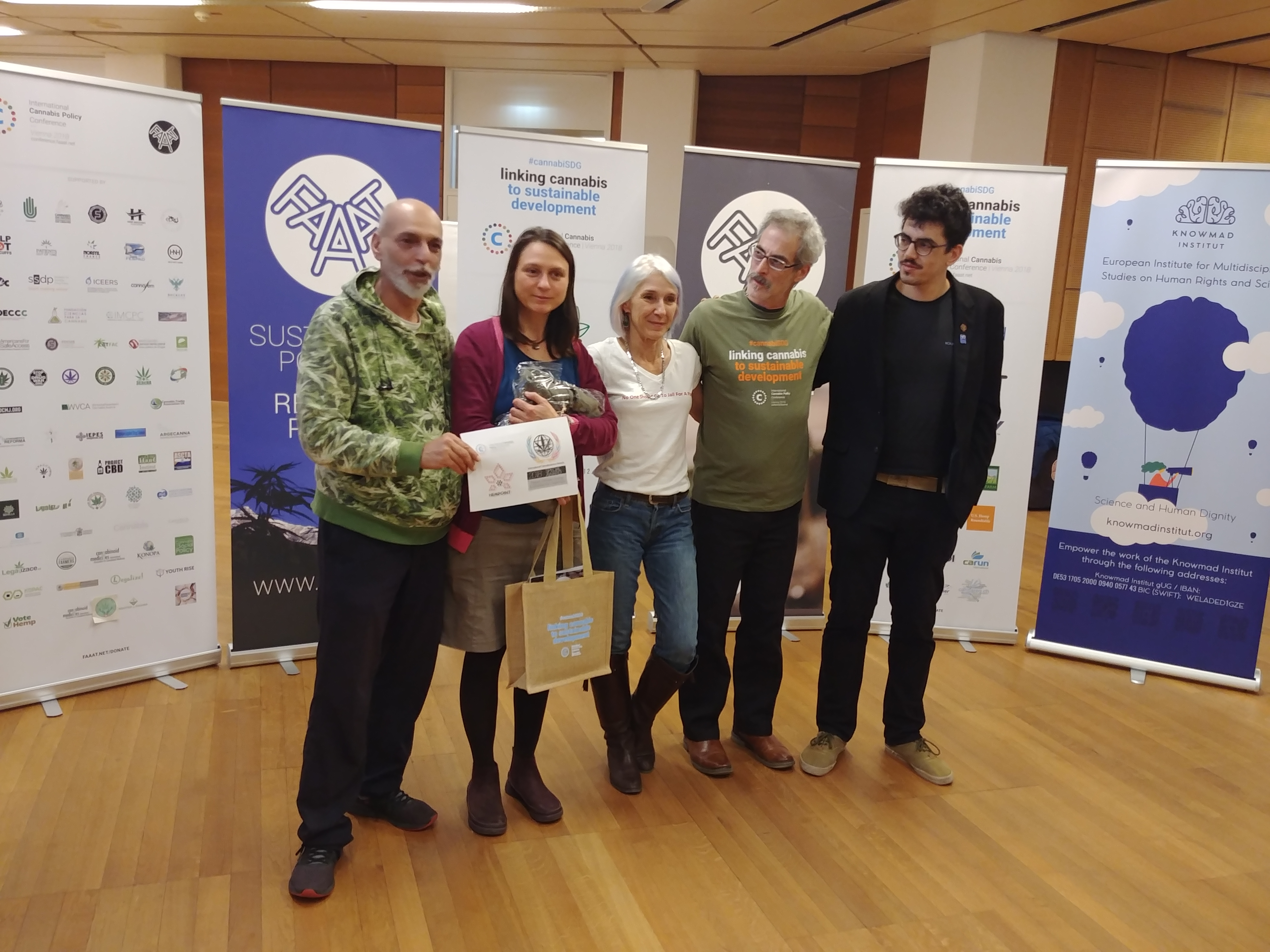
Leadership of FAAAT think and do tank during the closure of the International Cannabis Policy Conference 2018. From left to right: Farid Ghehiouèche, Hanka Gabrielová, Amy Case King, Michael Krawitz and Kenzi Riboulet-Zemouli.

As such, FAAAT has been essentially active at the multilateral and international level (including at the European Union level). FAAAT has also supported local advocacy groups (such as the Catalan Network of People who Use Drugs CATNPUD, the rural cannabis farmers of the Ghomara and Senhaja people of the Moroccan central Riff or the French platform of NGOs for the reform of drug policies). FAAAT also works to foster exchange of data and know-hows between politics, scholars and civil society stakeholders on drug-related policies and field practices.

The organization follows-up the work of the United Nations and international organizations (such as the INCB, UNODC or WHO) and regularly addresses international policymakers on drug-related issues, in particular the United Nations Commission on Narcotic Drugs through oral or written statements, by showcasing policy models or by organizing fora and symposia (such as the Legal Regulations fora or the International Cannabis Policy Conference at the United Nations).

The organization works closely with the official consultative bodies towards the United Nations: NYNGOC (New-York NGO Committee on Drugs) and VNGOC (Vienna NGO Committee on Drugs). FAAAT is also a founding member of the IMCPC (International Medical Cannabis Patients Coalition) and the Geneva Platform on Human Rights, Health and Psychoactive Substances.

More broadly, FAAAT holds a blog and informs media and local communities about key policy issues.

=== Conferences ===
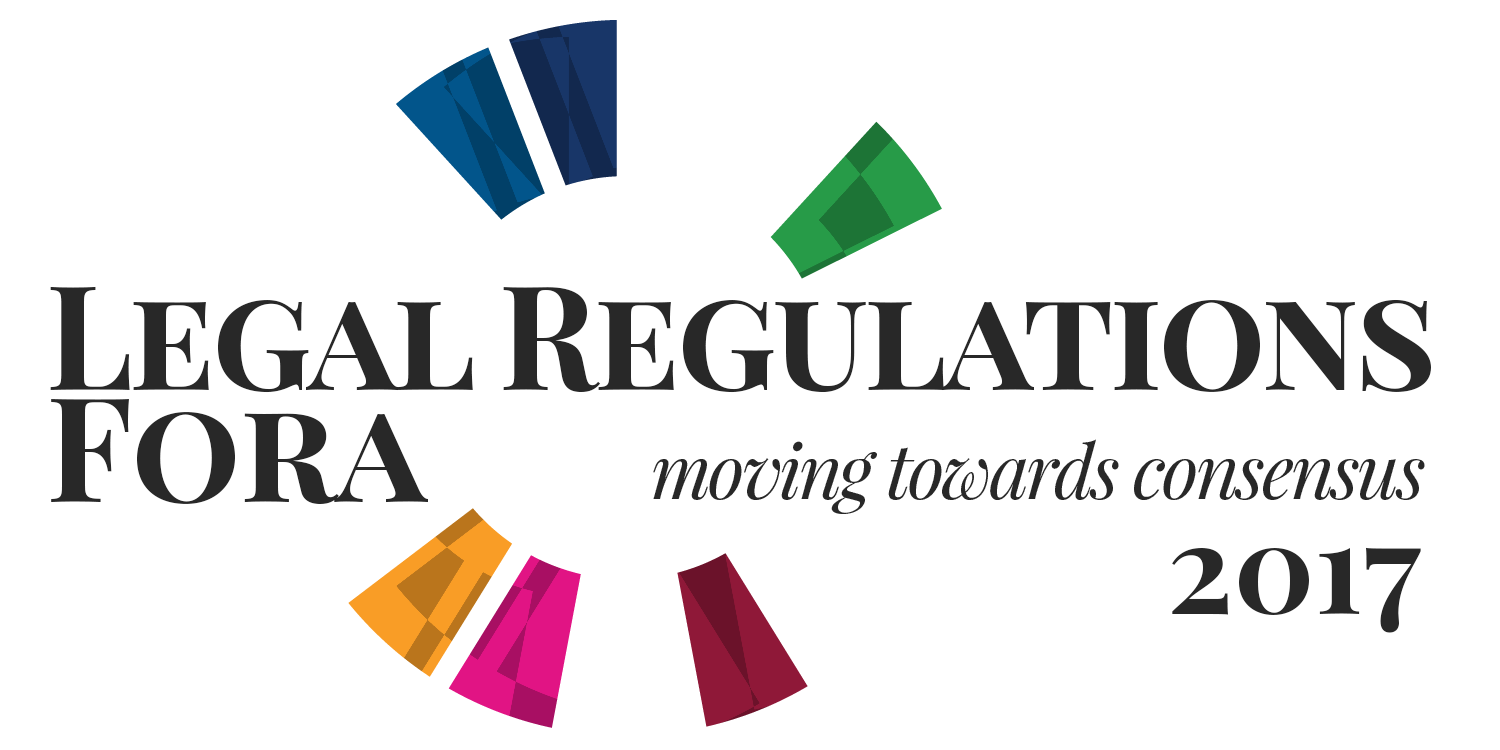
Logo of the series of events organized in the United Nations Office at Vienna

- Introduction to the Cannabis Social Clubs, United Nations, Vienna, March 2016 (In collaboration with NORML France, Nonviolent Radical Party, Fundación Renovatio, Regulación Responsable Spain and ICEERS).
- Legal Regulations Fora, United Nations, Vienna, March 2017
- "Grand oral de l’élection présidentielle" (Great audition of French presidential candidates) on drug policy, organised with the Conservatoire national des arts et métiers
- Right to Science and Freedom of Research with Scheduled Substances, United Nations, Vienna, March 2017 (In collaboration with the Government of the Czech Republic, MAPS, Associazione Luca Coscioni, Veterans for Medical Cannabis Access and ICEERS).
- International Cannabis Policy Conference, United Nations and Austria Center Vienna, Vienna, December 2018 (In collaboration with other NGOs).
- Just Coca forum, on coca leaf policy (May 2022).

== Think-tank: Research on alternative drug policies ==
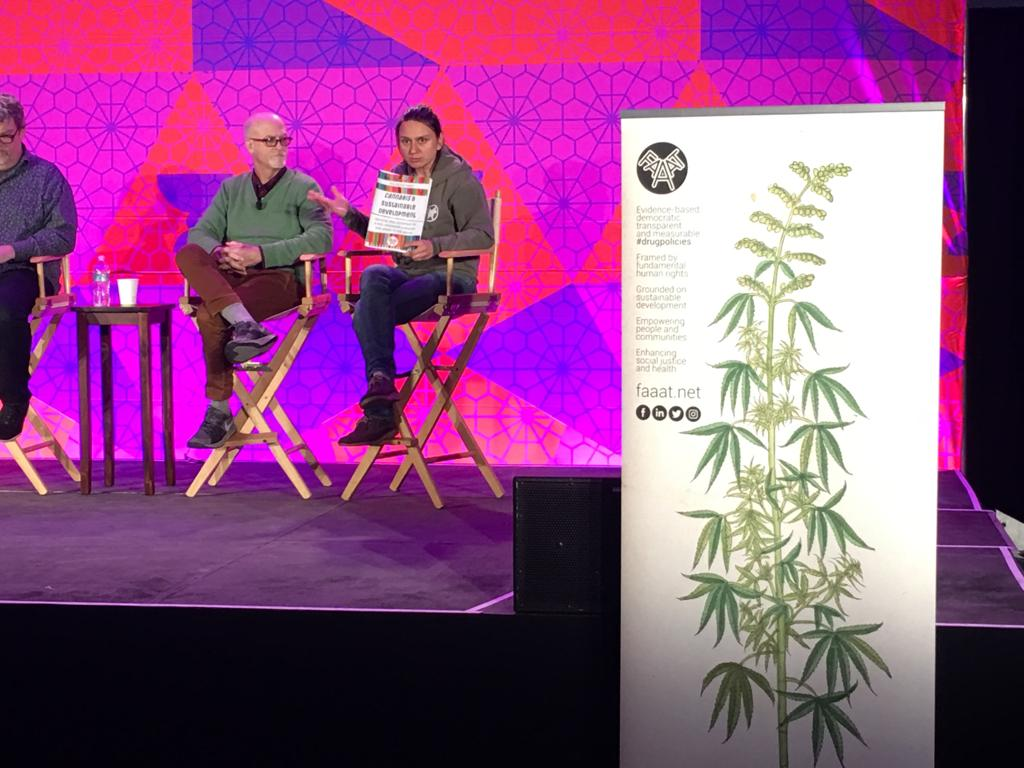
Hanka Gabrielová presenting FAAAT's Discussion Paper "Cannabis & Sustainable Development" during the Emerald Cup, December 2018

Although mainly focusing on international cannabis policy, the research department of FAAAT (so-called think-tank) claims to "impulse a modern approach to the categorification of "drugs": renew terminology, taxonomy & scheduling to review the biochemical paradigm of drug use" and pretends to "shift drug policies towards evidence and effectiveness: enhancing positive drug-related programs and actions from the ground."

As such, five main axis of research appear:

- A follow-up of geopolitical evolutions of international drug control policies and related agreements. During the preparations of the 2016 United Nations General Assembly Special Session dedicated to the world drug phenomenon, Kenzi Riboulet Zemouli, head of research of FAAAT, was the only personality in Spain to endorse the Drug Policy Alliance open letter to UN Secretary-General Ban Ki-moon, along with the former Director-General of UNESCO Federico Mayor Zaragoza and the former EU High Representative on common foreign and security policies Javier Solana. FAAAT also took part to the civil society mobilisations through different canals to raise awareness around that key UN summit.
- An important work of the think-tank has been the research and analysis surrounding the WHO process of scientifically reviewing cannabis for purposes of scheduling under the international drug control Treaties where FAAAT has encouraged the WHO to take action, and fuelled civil society, researchers and physicians involvement in the process. According to the British Medical Journal, once the definitive results of the WHO reviews of cannabis for international scheduling was made public early 2019, FAAAT considered that the outcome was "positive" and "clearly acknowledges medical applications of cannabis and cannabinoids, reintegrates them into pharmacopoeias, balances harms and [effectively] repeals the WHO position from 1954 according to which ‘there should be efforts towards the abolition of cannabis from all legitimate medical practice.’" In December 2020, the efforts of FAAAT team were successful, with the withdrawal of "cannabis and cannabis resin" from Schedule IV of the Single Convention on Narcotic Drugs of 1961.
- FAAAT considers that drug policies that enforce prohibition violate a series of fundamental human rights. Research is also being undertaken on this topic, and leads to outputs such as the submission of contributions to the UN High Commissioner for Human Rights.
- The 2030 Agenda for Sustainable Development and its numerous correlations with cannabis policies and laws, is the latest area explored by FAAAT research department.
- Besides international policy, one of the important task of the organization has been to popularize ground-up, peer-based and locally oriented models of legally regulated drug markets, in particular through the promotion of Appellations of Origin to protect traditional farmers knowledge in producing countries, or the so-called cannabis social club model for consumer countries, through the edition of advocacy documents or the organisation of workshops within the United Nations on the broader modalities of application of such model.

=== Publications ===
FAAAT is registered as an editor at the French national registry, and showcases its publications on its website. Remarked publications are:

- Cannabis & Sustainable Development. Paving the way for the next decade in Cannabis and hemp policy. Recommendations for the implementation of Cannabis policies aligned with international Human Rights standards, the 2030 Agenda for Sustainable Development and the 2016 UNGASS outcome document. ISBN 979-10-97087-06-7. Full PDF available online
- The Crimson Digest, Volume 1. Briefing on the international scientific assessment of cannabis: processes, stakeholders and history. ISBN 979-10-97087-06-7. PDF available online
- ECDD40 Procedural, methodological and terminological bias. Joint Civil Society Contribution to the 40th Meeting of the WHO Expert Committee on Drug Dependence. ISBN s/n.
- Cannabis Social Club: Policy for the XXIst century. English: ISBN 979-10-97087-11-1, French: ISBN 979-10-97087-12-8, Spanish: ISBN 979-10-97087-13-5.

== Civil society partners ==
- Americans for Safe Access (US)
- AIDES (France)
- Associazione Luca Coscioni for the freedom of scientific research (Italy)
- Beckley Foundation (UK)
- Cannabis Without Borders (France)
- Caribbean Collective for Justice (Jamaica)
- Catalan Network of People who Use Drugs (Spain)
- CatFAC (Spain)
- Conservatoire national des arts et métiers (France)
- Drug Policy Alliance (US)
- DrugScience (UK)
- EIHA (European Industrial Hemp Association) (Belgium)
- ENCOD (European Coalition for Just and Effective Drug Policies) (Belgium)
- Fédération Addiction (France)
- Fields of Green for ALL (South Africa)
- Fundación Daya (Chile)
- Hemp Industries Association (US)
- International Drug Policy Consortium (UK)
- International Centre for Ethnobotanical Education, Research and Service (Spain)
- Latinoamerica Reforma (Chile)
- Law Enforcement Against Prohibition (US)
- Médecins du Monde (France)
- Multidisciplinary Association for Psychedelic Studies (US)
- New York NGO Committee on Drugs (US)
- Nonviolent Radical Party, Transnational and Transparty (Italy)
- NORML France (France)
- Origins Council (US)
- Regulación Responsable (Spain)
- SOS Hépatites (France)
- Stop The Drug War foundation (US)
- Students for Sensible Drug Policy (US)
- Veterans for Medical Cannabis Access (US)
- Vienna NGO Committee on Drugs (Austria)

== See also ==
- 1961 Convention – Single Convention on Narcotic Drugs
- 1971 Convention – Convention on Psychotropic Substances
- 1988 Convention – United Nations Convention Against Illicit Traffic in Narcotic Drugs and Psychotropic Substances
- 2016 UNGASS
- Arguments for and against drug prohibition
- Commission on Narcotic Drugs
- Demand reduction
- Drug addiction
- Drug development
- Drug liberalization
- Drug policy reform
- Freedom of thought
- Harm reduction
- Human rights
- Illegal drug trade
- International Narcotics Control Board
- Prohibition (drugs)
- United Nations Development Programme
- United Nations Office on Drugs and Crime
- War on drugs
- World Health Organization
