= Cannabis in Uruguay =

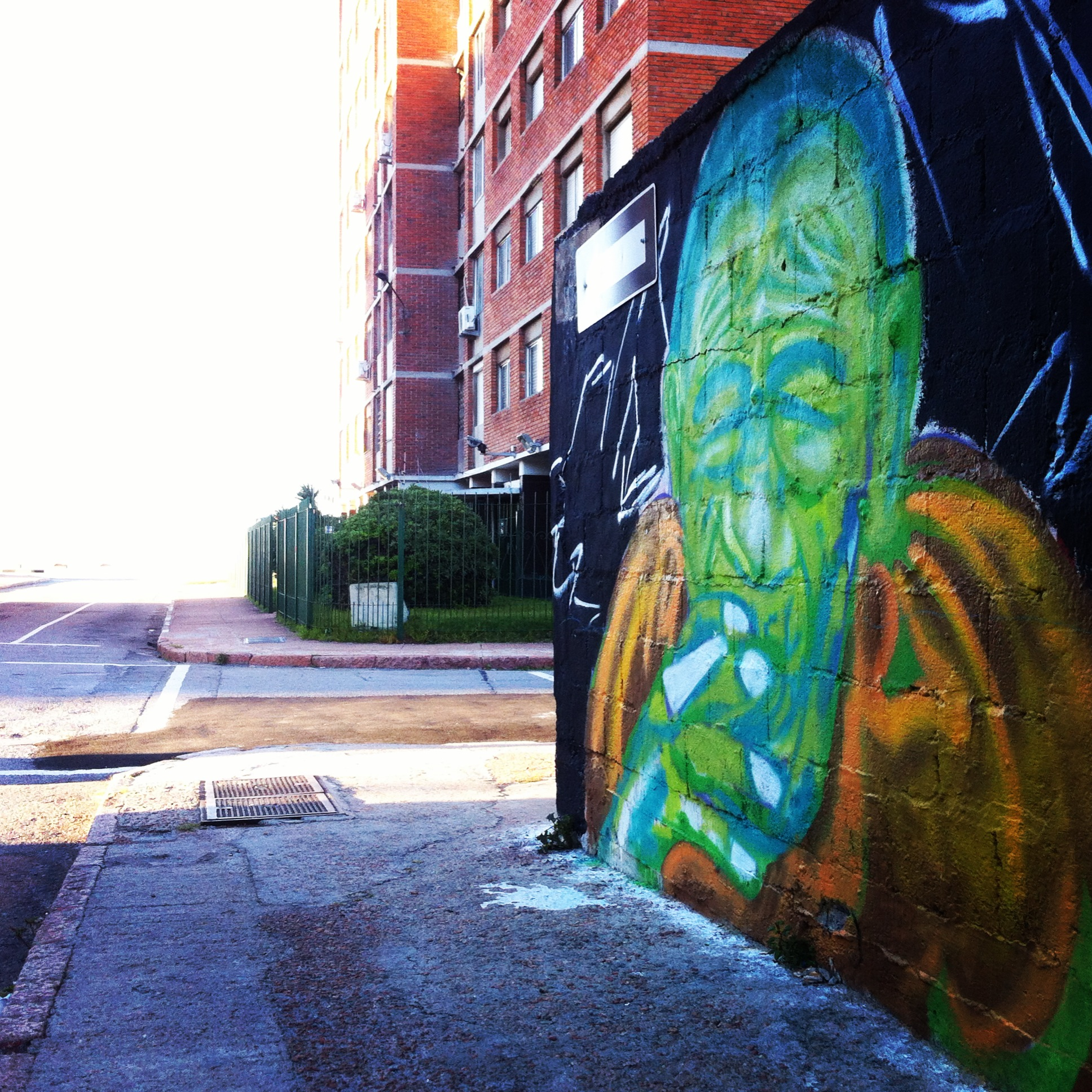
Graffiti in Montevideo

Cannabis is legal in Uruguay, and is one of the most widely used drugs in the nation.

President José Mujica signed legislation to legalize recreational cannabis in December 2013, making Uruguay the first country in the modern era to legalize cannabis. In August 2014, Uruguay legalized growing up to six plants at home, as well as the formation of Cannabis Social Clubs, a state-controlled marijuana dispensary regime, and the creation of a Cannabis regulatory institute (Instituto de Regulación y Control del Cannabis or IRCCA). In October 2014 the Government began registering growers' clubs, allowed in turn to grow a maximum of 99 cannabis plants annually; as of August 2015, there were 2,743 registered personal growers. After a long delay in implementing the retail component of the law, in 2017 sixteen pharmacies were authorized to sell cannabis commercially.

== History ==
Uruguay has never criminalized personal possession of drugs, and a 1974 law allowed judges to determine whether a given case of possession was personal or commercial. This law was later updated in 1998.

== Proposal for legalization ==
In June 2012, the Uruguayan government, under President José Mujica, announced plans to legalise sales of cannabis in order to fight drug-related crimes and health issues. The government stated that they would ask global leaders to do the same. Nobel prize winner Mario Vargas Llosa praised the decision as "courageous".

The law intends to reduce the profit that drug trafficking creates for organized crime, as well as reducing the drug-related violence and the social problems associated with it. Uruguay has one of the lowest murder rates in the region (though by some estimates, crime was slightly increasing in 2013).

Mujica's plan would allow users to cultivate the plant for non-commercial uses and grant licenses to professional farmers for larger scale production. The plan includes a system of user registry, taxation, and quality control; all coordinated through the existing agency that monitors tobacco, alcohol, and pharmaceuticals. He estimated that with 70,000 users, the country will have to produce more than 5,000 pounds each month. He also stated: "Uruguay wants to make a 'contribution to humanity' by legalising marijuana but will backtrack if the 'experiment' goes awry".

On 31 July 2013, the Chamber of Deputies passed the bill to legalize and regulate the production and sale of cannabis and sent it to the country's Senate. The bill was approved by 50 affirmative votes (the minimum required) with all Deputies from the ruling Broad Front voting in favor and all the other Deputies voting against it. The bill was passed by the Senate's Health Commission on 26 November and was expected to be voted by the full Senate since November 2013. The new law was accepted in the Senate on 10 December 2013 by a 16–13 vote. President Mujica signed the bill into law on 23 December 2013.

Julio Calzada, Secretary-General of Uruguay's National Drug Council, explained in a December 2013 interview that the government will be responsible for regulating the production side of the process: "Companies can get a license to cultivate if they meet all the criteria. However, this won’t be a free market. The government will control the entire production and determine the price, quality, and maximum production volume." People will be allowed to buy up to 40 g (1.4 oz) of cannabis from the Uruguayan government each month. Users have to be 18 or older and be registered in a national database to track their consumption. Cultivators are allowed to grow up to 6 crops at their homes each year and shall not surpass 480 g (17 oz).

In addition, registered Cannabis Social Clubs will be allowed to grow 99 plants annually for between 15 and 45 members. Buying cannabis will be prohibited to foreigners and it will be illegal to move it across international borders.

== Implementation ==
=== Postponement ===
In July 2014 president José Mujica announced that the full implementation of the law would be postponed to 2015, as "there are practical difficulties". Authorities will grow all the cannabis that can be sold legally, and concentrations of THC shall be 15% or lower. In August 2014, an opposition presidential candidate claimed that the new law was unworkable and would never be applied.

In December 2014, President Tabaré Vázquez was elected, and stated that though he had concerns about the cannabis law, ultimately it would move forward. At that point, cultivation for personal use and in cannabis social clubs had already begun, but commercial sale had not, and would ultimately be delayed until late 2017. Vázquez, a former oncologist, promised a "strict and close evaluation" of legal cannabis, and declared "first of all, you shouldn’t consume drugs."

=== Commercial distribution ===
In 2017, the government authorized 16 pharmacies to become cannabis distributors, allowed to sell only to the nearly 5,000 cannabis consumers registered with the government. The product is standardized into two offerings, "Alfa 1" and "Beta 1", both with relatively low THC content. Registered consumers must be Uruguayan, 18 or older, and are limited to 40 grams per month, with their identity and registration confirmed at the point of sale with a fingerprint scanner.

The percentage of THC and CBD in the strains sold to the public gradually increased, as the low potency initially offered was not well received by consumers. At the beginning of retail sales, the strains contained only 3% THC. This was later increased to 9%, then to 15%, and by the end of 2024, strains with up to 20% THC were being sold.

By the end of 2024, the "Épsilon" variety became the fourth strain available in pharmacies, featuring a THC content of up to 20%. According to the 2026 government evaluation, the regulation has significantly impacted the illicit market, with traditional "pressed" cannabis (narcotráfico clásico) dropping from the primary source of access in 2014 to just 6.7% of the market by 2024.

== Public opinion ==
According to polls in 2012–2013 by Equipos Mori, Cifra and Factum, 58–66% of Uruguayans opposed legalizing the sale of marijuana while 24–29% supported it.

== See also ==
- Arguments for and against drug prohibition
- Cannabis Social Club
- Drug liberalization
- Latin American drug legalization
- Legality of cannabis by country
- Minors and the legality of cannabis
