= Cannabis rescheduling =

Cannabis rescheduling may refer to:

- Generally: Legality of cannabis
- International treaty: Removal of cannabis and cannabis resin from Schedule IV of the Single Convention on narcotic drugs, 1961
- United Kingdom law: Cannabis classification in the United Kingdom
- United States law: Removal of cannabis from Schedule I of the Controlled Substances Act
