= Minors and the legality of cannabis =

Issue around the legalisation of cannabis

Minors and the legality of cannabis is one of the issues around the legalisation of cannabis, with most jurisdictions placing strict age limits in a similar way as is done with the drinking age for alcohol.

The details differ: in Germany, Luxembourg, Malta, South Africa and Uruguay, possession, consumption and cultivation of cannabis is legal for those that are at least 18 years old. In the U.S. nineteen states have legalized cannabis for recreational use for individuals that are at least 21 years old - while in the Netherlands, all drugs are technically illegal, but those 18 years old and older can buy cannabis within a "coffeeshop". In the Australian Capital Territory (ACT) cannabis is legal to possess, grow and use for those aged over 18 years old, however, cannabis can only be consumed at home, is illegal to sell and it is illegal to acquire cannabis seeds in the ACT.

In Canada, the legal age to buy, possess, consume, and grow cannabis is 19, except for Alberta which is 18 and Quebec which is 21.

== Health and cannabis among minors ==
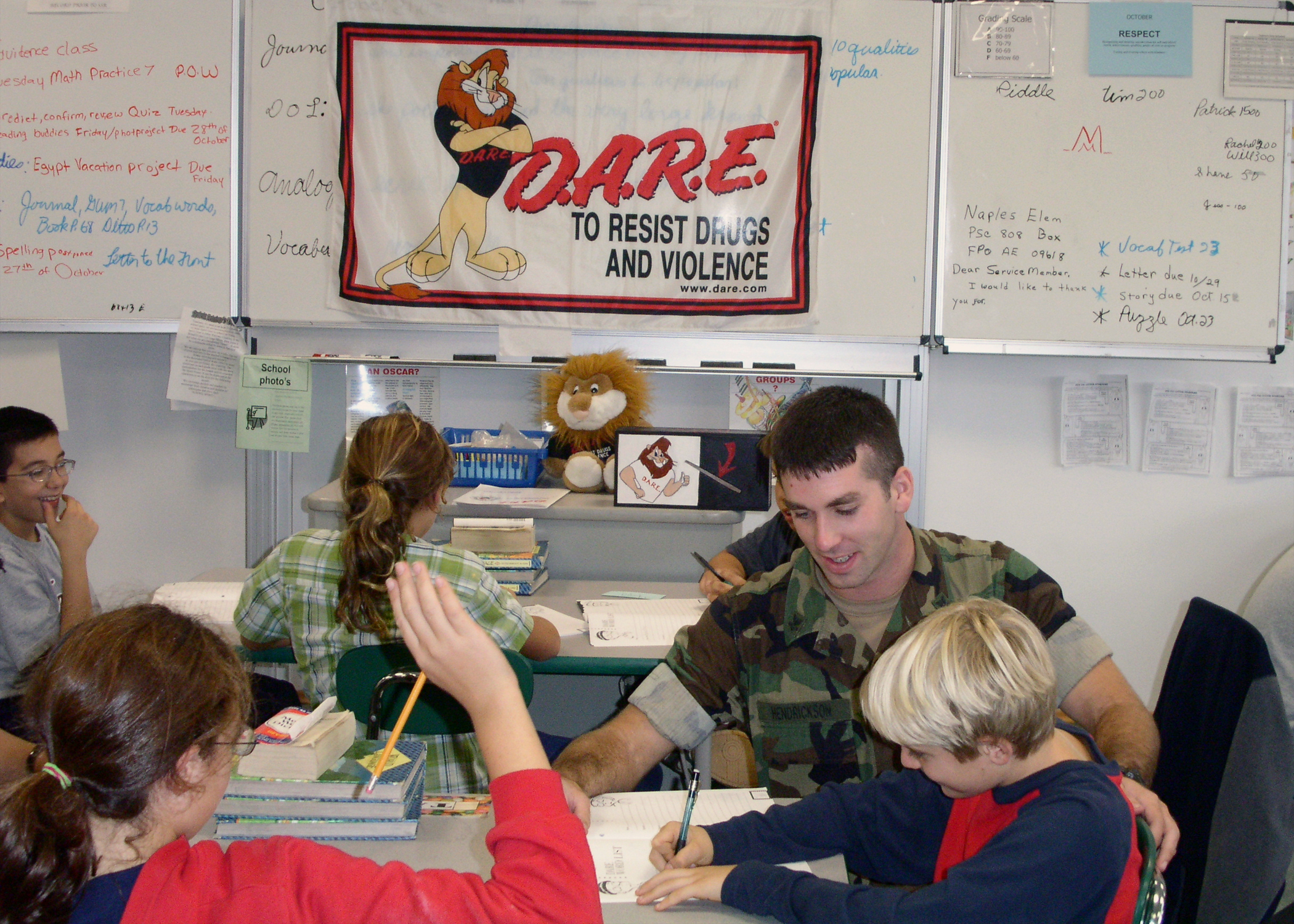
Master at Arms 2nd Class Aaron M. Hendrickson, Naples, Italy area Drug Abuse Resistance Education (DARE) officer, follows along with Justin Goldacker as they work to complete a 2003 lesson in the DARE workbook.

Countries tend to regulate cannabis differently depending on the way in which they view cannabis and its potential effects on individuals, including minors. One reason that individuals are concerned about the use among minors is because of the higher chance of dependency that studies have shown. Epidemiologists have found that 9% of people who begin using cannabis at 19 years or older satisfy the criteria of dependency and this number triples at ages under 18 years old. The reason for this is that a minor's brain is under rapid development when they are young. Studies have also shown that anxiety and depressive disorders have been the product of cannabis use and exposure among minors.

Medical cannabis is used for children with severe illnesses such as cancer and epilepsy. The use of cannabis relieves the pain and is seen as a “healthier” alternative because it is less addictive than drugs such as morphine and Oxycontin. Other pain-relieving medicines that are opioids tend to cause nausea and vomiting, while cannabis reduces these side effects. Because of this, many advocates argue that if opioids are acceptable to treat a minor’s pain, then cannabis should be legal as well. As cannabis consumption among minors has increased, the rate at which they consume alcohol and smoke cigarettes has decreased dramatically.

== In the United States ==
In the United States, marijuana is illegal under the federal Controlled Substances Act, but most states have legalized some form of medical marijuana, and a smaller but growing number of states have legalized marijuana for recreational use by adults, with the exception of individuals under the age of 21. However, it is currently illegal in all 50 states for minors to use marijuana recreationally. In some states (such as Illinois, Pennsylvania, and Connecticut) minors may use certain forms of marijuana for medical use if certain specific conditions are met.

== Germany ==
In 2024, Germany legalised cannabis for adults (those aged 18-years-old and over) via the Cannabis Act. Those 18 to 20 years old in Germany are allowed to buy up to 30 grams of cannabis per month, whereas those aged 21 and over in Germany can buy up to 50 grams of cannabis per month.

The consumption of cannabis in Germany is prohibited within 100m of schools, kindergartens, playgrounds, sports facilities, and pedestrian zones in city centres between 07:00 and 20:00.

== South Africa ==
In 2024, South Africa legalised cannabis for adults (people aged 18-years-old and above).

== Uruguay ==
=== Legality ===
Uruguay legalized cannabis in 2014. Uruguay is the first nation in the world to regulate all aspects of the cannabis market (production, sales, and consumption) for those that are at least 18 years old. The reason for its proposed legalization was to get rid of the organized crime and violence that came along with the illegal drug industry. Their efforts to legalize the drug were not done because of social pressure, but more so out of the efforts to protect society from the dangers that are produced from an illegal market. Uruguay’s government wanted to seize the market from criminals, not encourage individuals to smoke cannabis. The law that was put into place states that an individual can have up to six plants at their home, cannabis will be sold over the counter, buyers must sign up for a registry that permits the purchase of cannabis, and there is a 40-gram cap per month.

=== Opposition ===
A survey in 2014 before the legalization law in Uruguay was implemented suggested that over 60 percent of people in the country believed legalization should be repealed. Many individuals were doubtful that the legalization of cannabis would get rid of criminal organizations, such as the drug cartel. While criminal groups will not be able to compete with the legalized cannabis costs, they will be able to fall back on other activities such as trafficking and selling harder drugs, which can lead to larger crime. Because the purpose of legalization is for public health and safety reasons, publicity or advertising is against the law. Any kind of publicity of cannabis is prohibited, meaning there cannot be any billboards or advertisements for the drug.

=== Effects on minors ===
Despite the skepticism within society, data has shown that among regular consumers, young individuals are most likely to be the ones consuming cannabis. The age in which one can possess and consume cannabis is 18. In comparison to the United States, this is three years younger. The cannabis consumption age in Uruguay is a reflection of the drinking age, because the legal drinking age in Uruguay is 18 years old as well. Like the United States, Uruguay applied the same kind of restrictions to cannabis as they did to alcohol.

After the legalization had passed within Uruguay, there was an increase in secondary school students' prevalence with the drug. In 2003, 8.4% of students had consumed marijuana during the previous twelve months, and in 2014, 17% had. The typical user at this age was much more likely to be male than female. There are many concerns about this increase in cannabis use, which is why new prevention strategies are being suggested, such as drug education courses.

== The Netherlands ==
=== Legality ===
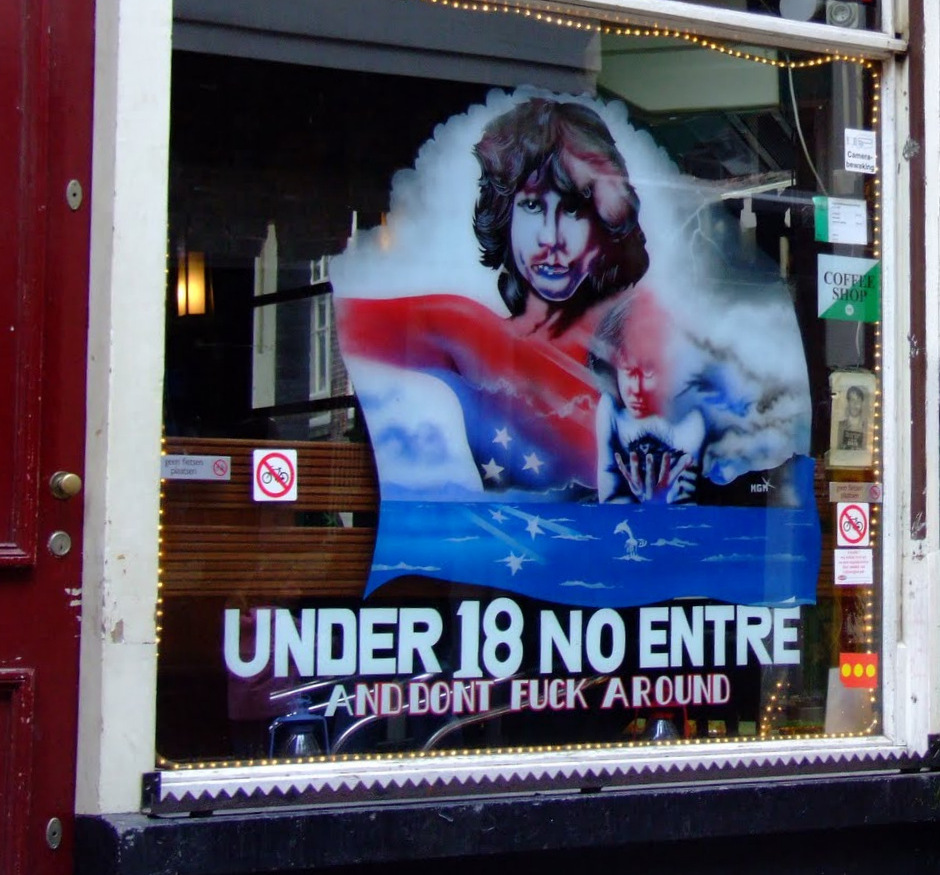
Coffeeshops are establishments in the Netherlands where the sale of cannabis for personal consumption by the public is tolerated by the local authorities but illegal to enter for those under 18.

All drugs, including cannabis, are technically illegal in the Netherlands. This means it is illegal to produce, possess, and sell the drugs. Dutch police conduct about 5,000 marijuana raids annually throughout the country. But the government designed a drug policy that tolerates cannabis use under strict conditions for those that are at least 18 years old.

==== Coffee shops ====
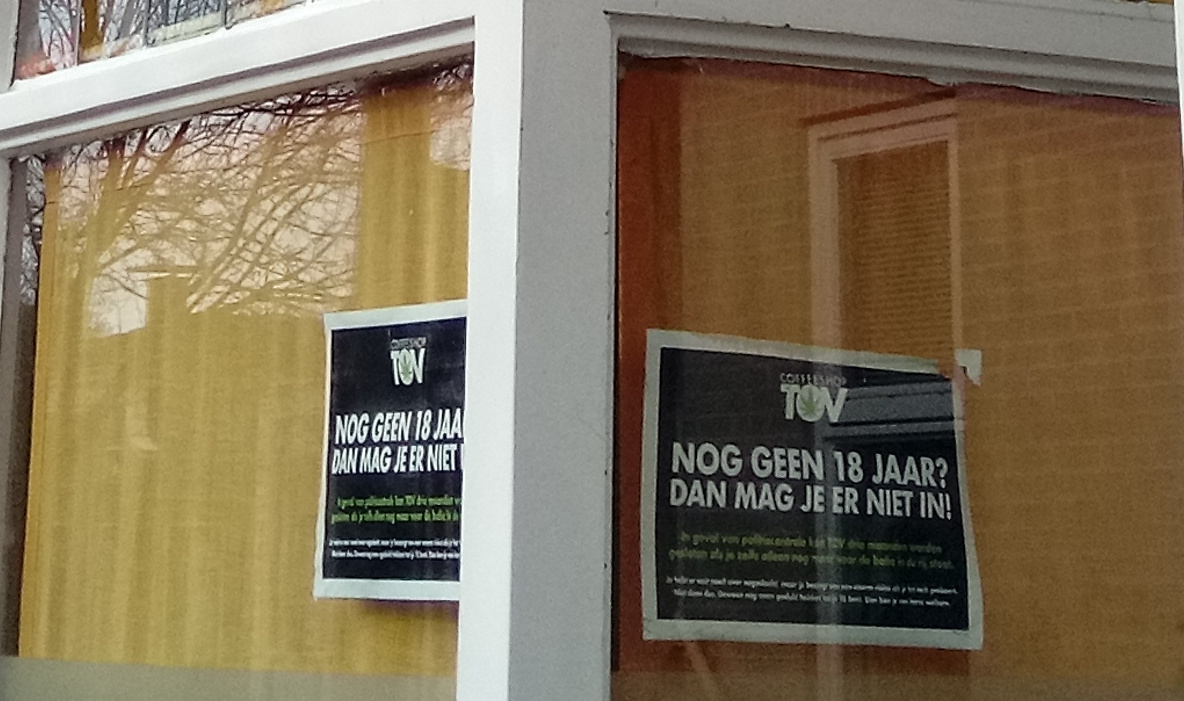
Signs at a coffeeshop stating no entry for those under 18

The only places individuals can smoke cannabis is within "coffeeshops". In these coffeeshops, they sell cannabis, which is considered to be soft drugs in comparison to hard drugs; drugs such as heroin. The purpose of these coffee shops are to help people who use soft drugs such as cannabis, to avoid contact with hard drugs, such as heroin. The legal age to get into these coffeeshops is 18 years old. While cannabis can be sold legally through coffeeshops, trafficking the drug is illegal under Dutch law, which means that the coffeeshops have to obtain their cannabis secretly and illegally.

Criteria for coffee shops:

- must not cause any nuisance;
- are not permitted to sell hard drugs;
- are not permitted to sell cannabis to minors;
- are not permitted to advertise drugs;
- are not permitted to sell large quantities (over 5 grams of cannabis) in a single transaction.

=== Effects on minors ===
In 2009 it was reported that children as young as twelve years old were feeling pressured to try cannabis in the Netherlands. The reason for this is because of the tolerance principle that is in place, meaning that authorities cannot prosecute someone for possessing cannabis if it is under five grams. Because of the lack of enforcement in this, it is giving children the opportunity to possess marijuana in small amounts. Dutch youth have reported higher than average availability of cannabis, but no higher compared to the United States. Many coffee shops have been shut down because of how close they are to schools. Local authorities were afraid that the location of the businesses would influence the youth and take advantage of them.

Amsterdam's mayor from July 2010 to October 2017, Eberhard van der Laan, stated, "I think the more relaxed you look at this phenomena [sic], the easier people will stop with it because there is no thrill in using it [if it's tolerated]." This is a common perception among many individuals within the Netherlands. While they fear substance abuse, citizens of the Netherlands are accepting of the decriminalization of cannabis because individuals will often start to find it "boring" and no longer want to consume cannabis. There is currently no movement towards decriminalization or legalization of cannabis for minors.

== Czech Republic ==
In 2010, the personal possession of certain previously illegal drugs, including cannabis, were decriminalised in the Czech Republic. A research paper published by the International Journal of Drug Policy in 2017 found no evidence that decriminalisation affected the age at which a person started using cannabis.

== See also ==
- Age of majority
- Cannabis in Canada
- Cannabis in the United States
- Cannabis in Uruguay
- Drug policy of the Netherlands
- Legality of cannabis
