= Serge Livrozet =

French writer and ex-convict (1939–2022)

- Born: 21 October 1939; Tolon, Provença, France
- Died: 29 November 2022 (aged 83); Nice, Provença, France
- Occupation(s): Accountant, plumber

Serge Livrozet (21 October 1939 – 29 November 2022) was a French writer, anarchist activist and convicted thief.

== Biography ==
Serge Livrozet was born on 21 October 1939 in the Occitan city of Tolon. He never knew his father and was raised by his mother, Suzanne Macchiavelli, a sex worker with right-wing views. Livrozet himself was drawn towards left-wing politics. He grew up in Nancy. Livrozet began working as a plumber at the age of 13, and after coming of age, he volunteered for the French Air Force and set up an advertising company. After being defrauded by his business partner, in 1961, Livrozet first robbed his own company, then committed a series of robberies of villas on the French Riviera. He was arrested and imprisoned in Loos for five years.

After his release in 1965, he met his wife Annie Hout and began writing. By 1967, Livrozet had become an anarchist and joined the National Confederation of Labour (CNT). During the events of May 68, he participated in the occupation of the University of Paris. After the suppression of the demonstrations, Livrozet sought to attack capitalism by working as a safe-cracker, with the aim of funding the publication of a left-wing periodical. He was arrested and imprisoned again, serving two years of his sentence at La Santé Prison and two more in Melun. During his incarceration, he earned a diploma in accounting through his prison education and organised prisoners towards a prison strike.

After leaving prison in 1972, he ceased his criminal activities and dedicated himself to political activism. He established a prisoner support group, the Comité d'action des prisonniers, together with Michel Foucault. By the following year, Livrozet had broken with La Cause du peuple over its support for capital punishment, and went on to co-found the left-wing periodical Libération; he also published the book From Prison to Revolt, which analysed the French prison system. In 1973 and 1974, he provided aid to Chilean refugees who had fled the country's military dictatorship. In 1976, he led a political demonstration calling for the abolition of capital punishment in France.

During the 1980s, Livrozet hosted a weekly show on Radio Libertaire. In 1986, he was accused of involvement in a counterfeiting operation, but was acquitted in 1989. In the 1990s, he joined the Anarchist Federation and began running writers' workshops for disadvantaged students. In 2001, he played a role in the film Time Out.

Livrozet died on 29 November 2022, at the age of 83.

== Selected works ==
- From Prison to Revolt (1973)

== Bibliography ==
- Dangerfield, Micha Barban (3 October 2017). "qui est serge livrozet, le prisonnier qui a inspiré foucault et tous les insoumis de france ?". Vice. Archived from the original on 3 October 2017.
- Lenoir, Hugues (18 June 2024) [2014-05-03]. "LIVROZET Serge, Raymond". Dictionnaire des anarchistes (in French). Paris: Editions de l'Atelier.
