= Police Foundation (UK) =

British charitable organization

The Police Foundation describes itself as "the UK’s policing think tank" and as "the only independent body in the UK that researches, understands and works to improve policing for the benefit of the public."

It is governed under a trust deed, dated 9 July 1979 with subsequent amendments, and its charitable objects are the "advancement and promotion of efficient and effective policing to undertake and promote study and research into the methods organisation and effectiveness of the police and the training of police officers and to publish the useful results of such study and research".

Since 1994 the Police Foundation has produced the UK's police driving handbooks Roadcraft: The Police Driver's Handbook and Motorcycle Roadcraft: The Police Rider's Handbook.

The organisation has hosted a number of policing and criminal justice inquiries and reviews including the Independent Inquiry into the Misuse of Drugs Act 1971 and the Strategic Review of Policing in England and Wales, the first fundamental review of policing for many years, chaired by Sir Michael Barber.

== See also ==
- Independent Office for Police Conduct
- Law Enforcement Action Partnership
