= Veterans for Medical Cannabis Access =

American cannabis advocacy group

- Founded: 2007
- Founder: Martin H. Chilcutt
- Type: Non-profit organization
- Purpose: Protecting basic human right to access required medicine
- Location: Elliston, Virginia, U.S.
- Region served: United States
- Key people: Michael Krawitz Al Byrne co-founders
- Website: veteransformedicalmarijuana.org

Veterans for Medical Cannabis Access (VMCA), which was founded as Veterans for Medical Marijuana Access (VMMA) reflecting the pejorative word "marijuana", is an Elliston, Virginia-based non-profit service organization designed to assist American veterans who wish to be able to use marijuana for medical purposes with a doctor's recommendation. VMCA works towards the freedom for veterans to discuss the medical use of marijuana with their doctors without the risk of reprisal.

== Activity in the United States ==
When it was created in 2007, Veterans for Medical Cannabis Access was the first American veteran service organization designed to assist veterans with medical access to cannabis. Since then, VCMA has been lobbying and advocating both at the federal level (Veterans Affairs) and at the State-level, to geographically and qualitatively increase access to medical cannabis and derivates for US military veterans. The organization seeks to make sure that the United States federal government allows veterans access to medicines their doctor prescribes or recommends, and broaden the right to access and the affordability of medicines.

== Activity at international level ==
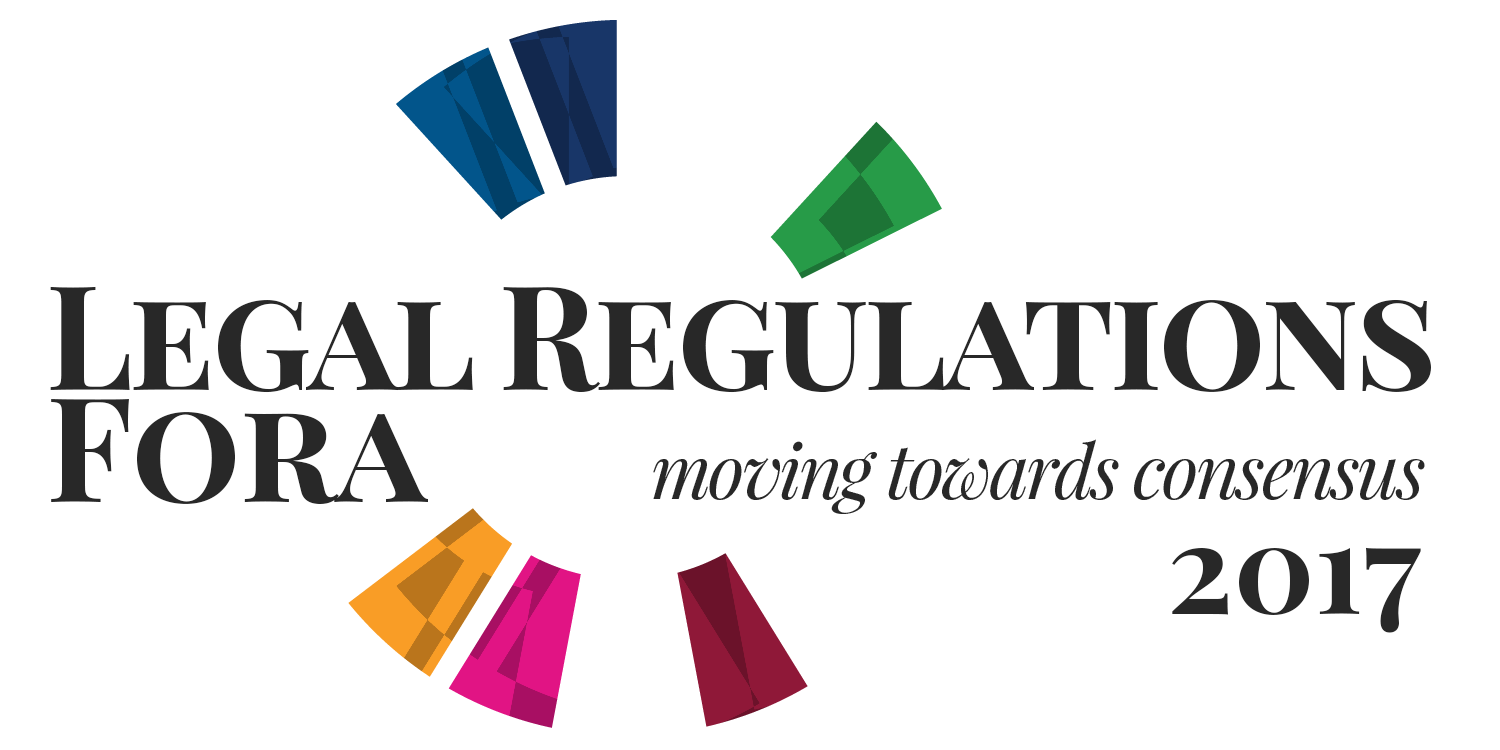
Logo of the series of events organized in the United Nations Office at Vienna

During the first decade of the 21st century, VMCA increased its presence and advocacy close to the relevant international institutions, in particular on policy issues at the Commission on Narcotic Drugs meetings, and close to the United Nations Office on Drugs and Crime and the International Narcotics Control Board. VMCA is also following the process of scientific review of cannabis by the World Health Organization towards a change in the scheduling of the substance at international level. VCMA has developed close collaborations with major European NGOs such as DrugScience, the European Coalition for Just and Effective Drug Policies or the FAAAT think & do tank. VCMA Executive Director Michael Krawitz has been named Senior Adviser of FAAAT, with which he has developed an active advocacy and research in relation with the WHO review of Cannabis for international scheduling. In 2015 in Prague, VMCA was involved in the creation of the IMCPC (International Medical Cannabis Patients' Coalition). Since 2017, VCMA collaborates in the United Nations Office in Vienna to the organization of the Legal Regulations Fora, series of civil society events aimed at spreading ground-up proposals that aim to impact national decision-makers gathered in these meetings.

== See also ==
- Cannabis and the United States military
- Legality of cannabis
- Removal of cannabis from Schedule I of the Controlled Substances Act
- Medical cannabis in the United States
- International Drug Control system
- Schedules of controlled drugs and substances
- Michael Krawitz
