= Michael Krawitz =

US Air force veteran

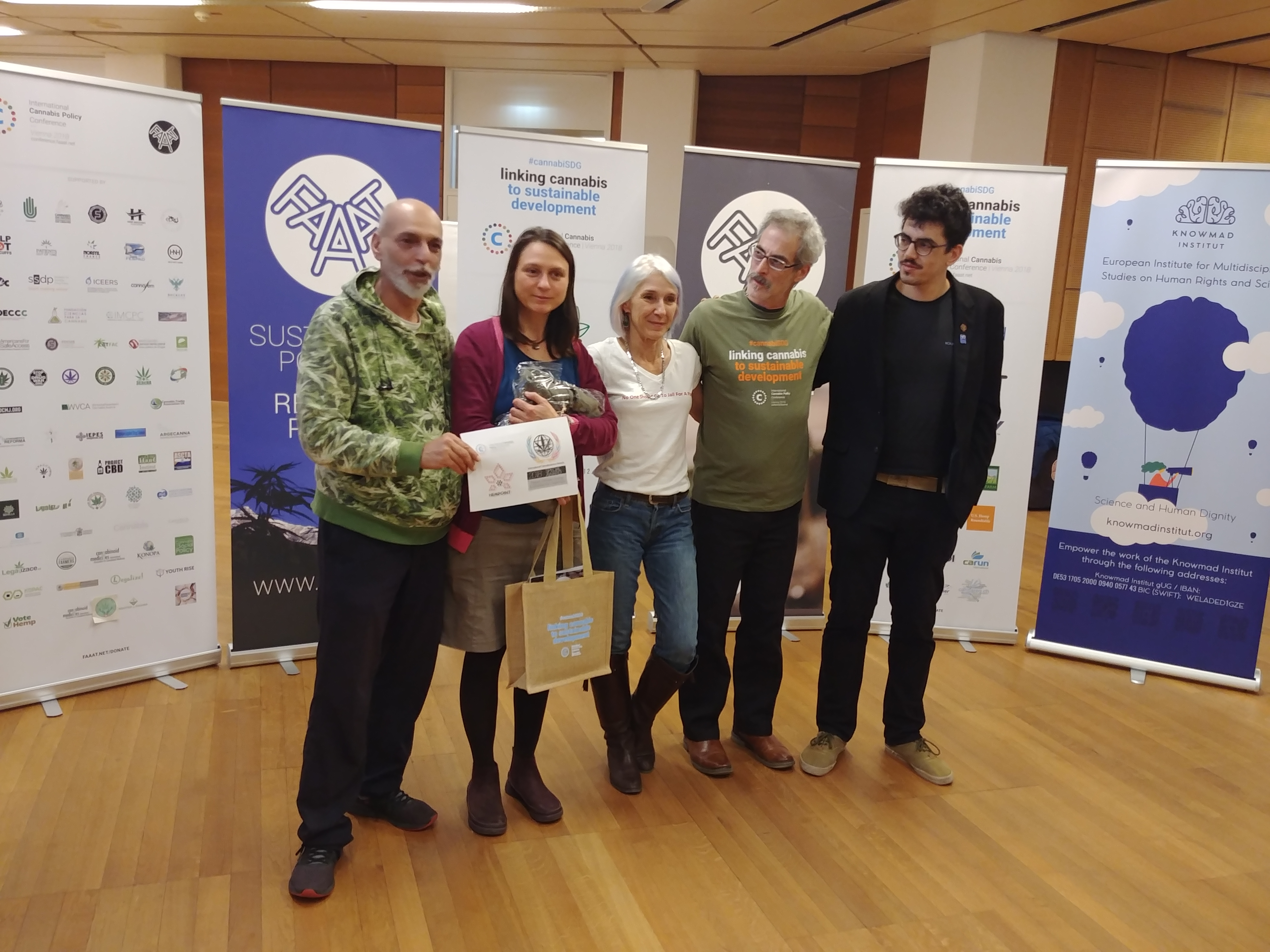
Michael Krawitz (4th from the left) with the leadership of FAAAT at the Vienna International Centre in 2018.

Michael Alan Krawitz is a US Air force veteran, Executive Director of the non-profit Veterans for Medical Cannabis Access, researcher on the history of medical cannabis, and international advocate for cannabis policy reform with FAAAT think & do tank and the International Association for Cannabinoid Medicines.

== Biography ==
Krawitz served in the United States Air Force from 1981 to 1986 as an Electronic Warfare Systems Technician working on avionics on-board B-52 bombers and was a sergeant. He was stationed in Guam.

Electronic Warfare Systems technician and repaired

Apart from his military career, Krawitz has been involved in the United States, researching the traditions and historicity of cannabis in the country, as well as working to secure access and availability of medical cannabis for veterans, in particular with the United States Department of Veterans Affairs and has extended its involvement at the international level since the United Nations General Assembly Special Session on the world drug situation in 1998 throughout the 2020s.

Internationally he has been involved in the New-York NGO Committee on Drugs as Executive Committee member, as patient representative of the International Association for Cannabinoid Medicines. Krawitz is also policy adviser of the organization FAAAT think & do tank for his involvement around the World Health Organization and Single Convention on Narcotic Drugs international scheduling of Cannabis, being instrumental in the efforts leading to the withdrawal of "cannabis and cannabis resin" from Schedule IV of the 1961 Convention, in December 2020.

Krawitz is also working on the creation of Appellation of Origin and other intellectual property tools for traditional Cannabis products, both in the United States, participating as a board member of the Californian farmers organization Origins Council, and internationally as a registered observer to the World Intellectual Property Organization.

Since 2021, he has been member of board of advisors to the Virginia Cannabis Control Authority (Cannabis Public Health Advisory Council).

== Publications ==
- Mathre, Mary; Krawitz, Michael (2002). "Cannabis series-the whole story Part 4: The medicinal use of Cannabis pre-prohibition". Drugs, Habits and Social Policy. 2 (2): 3–7. doi:10.1108/17459265200200010.
- Wirtshafter, Don; Krawitz, Michael A. (2006). "Hemp Stamps Bring Record Prices". Journal of Industrial Hemp. 10 (2): 67–74. doi:10.1300/J237v10n02_06. S2CID 154651330.
- Krawitz, Michael A. (2006). "Parke, Davis Marketed Cannabis Extracts To Doctors With 'Buy American' Pitch" (PDF). O'Shaughnessy's. Spring 2006. Society of Cannabis Clinicians: 4–5.
- Krawitz, Michael (2007). "Collectible Cannabis Art". Journal of Industrial Hemp. 12 (1): 47–54. doi:10.1300/J237v12n01_05. S2CID 87278546.
- Krawitz, Michael (2008). "Nostrums, Quackery, and Visions of Grandeur". Journal of Industrial Hemp. 13 (2): 171–175. doi:10.1080/15377880802393171. S2CID 85310390.
- Krawitz, Michael (2015) [2015]. Statement of Michael Krawitz as delivered to the World Health Organization, Expert Committee on Drug Dependence (PDF) (Speech). 38th meeting of the World Health Organization's Expert Committee on Drug Dependence, November 2015. Expert Committee on Drug Dependence, Open session contribution. Geneva, Switzerland: World Health Organization (published December 2015). Archived from the original (PDF) on March 24, 2022.
- Krawitz, Michael (2015). "Veterans Health Administration Policy on Cannabis as an Adjunct to Pain Treatment with Opiates". AMA Journal of Ethics. 17 (6): 558–561. doi:10.1001/journalofethics.2015.17.6.pfor2-1506. PMID 26075984.
- Riboulet-Zemouli, Kenzi; Krawitz, Michael A.; Ghehiouèche, Farid (2018). The Crimson Digest (Vol. 1), Briefing on the international scientific assessment of Cannabis: Processes, stakeholders and history. Paris, France: FAAAT editions. ISBN 979-10-97087-06-7.
- Riboulet-Zemouli, Kenzi; Krawitz, Michael A.; Ghehiouèche, Farid (2021). History, Science, and Politics of International Cannabis Scheduling, 2015–2021. Vienna, Austria: FAAAT editions. ISBN 979-10-97087-50-0.
- Riboulet-Zemouli, Kenzi; Krawitz, Michael A. (2022). "WHO's first scientific review of medicinal Cannabis: from global struggle to patient implications" (PDF). Drugs, Habits and Social Policy. 23 (1): 5–21. doi:10.1108/DHS-11-2021-0060. S2CID 247421561.
