= NORML France =

French cannabis reform and harm reduction non-profit

- Chanvre & Libertés
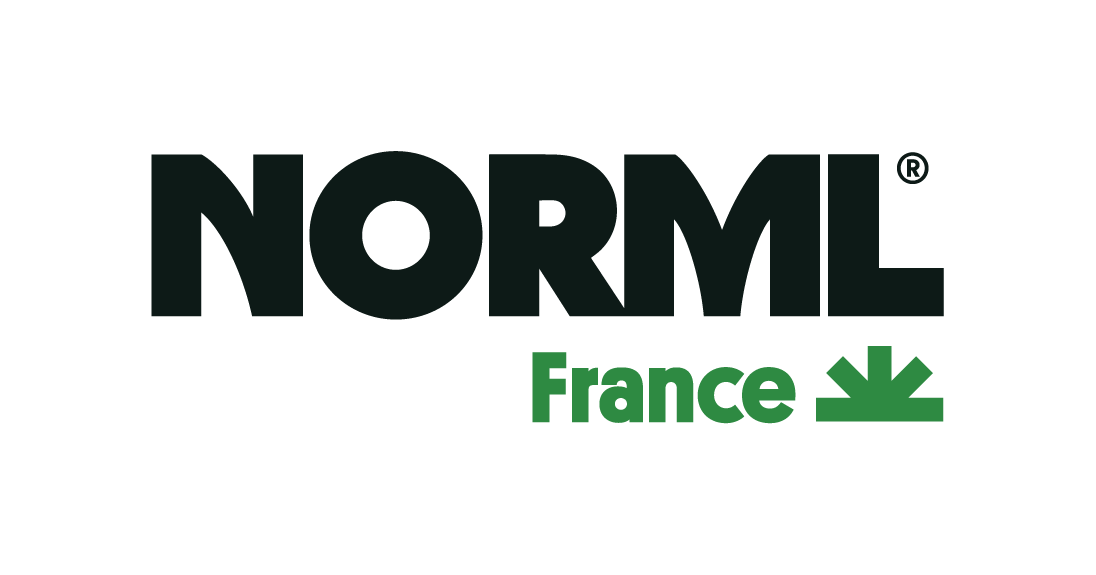
- Founded: 1995
- Founders: Olivier Bertrand MD; Farid Ghehiouèche
- Purpose: Legalization or decriminalization of marijuana in France
- Location: Toulouse, France
- Region served: France
- Website: www.norml.fr

NORML France (/ˈnɔːrməl/, the National Organization for the Reform of Marijuana Laws), previously known as Chanvre & Libertés - NORML France (Hemp & Freedom - NORML France) is a French non-profit organization based in Toulouse but active in all territories of France, whose aim is to move public opinion sufficiently to achieve the depenalization of illicit drugs consumption, the legalization of non-medical marijuana and the increased access to medical cannabis in France, so that the responsible use of cannabis by adults is no longer subject to penalty.

The organization operated a re-foundation in 2013, after the fusion of several regional groups of cannabis policy reform advocacy or activism (among which the older was created 1995).

Initially involved on international drug policy reform issues, NORML France split in 2016 part of its activity to focus on national cannabis-related actions, letting the newly created FAAAT think & do tank handle international advocacy and coordinate collective action at the international level.

== Other branches of NORML ==
- NORML USA
- NORML New Zealand
- NORML UK

== See also ==
- Cannabis in France
- Drug liberalization
- Drug policy reform
- Legality of cannabis
- European Coalition for Just and Effective Drug Policies (ENCOD)
- FAAAT think & do tank
