= Teesside Cannabis Club =

Cannabis social club in County Durham, United Kingdom

- Logo of the Teesside Cannabis Club, featuring founder Michael Fisher shown in Bob Marley style art.
- Interactive map of Teesside Cannabis Club

Restaurant information
- Established: 2014
- Location: 44 Norton Road, Stockton-On-Tees, County Durham, TS18 2BS, United Kingdom
- Coordinates: 54.56881123990249°N 1.3125541733012562°W
- Website: www.teessidecannabisclub.co.uk

Teesside Cannabis Club is a members-only cannabis social club in Stockton-on-Tees, England. It is known locally as the Exhale Harm Reduction Centre. The club does not sell cannabis, operating with a bring-your-own policy, but does sell snacks and non-alcohol drinks and acts as a social venue for consumers of cannabis.

== History ==
Teesside Cannabis Club was founded in 2014 by Michael Fisher, beginning as a Facebook group, and opened its current permanent location in 2017. Fisher was inspired by the prevalence of cannabis social clubs in Spain.

Under the policing policy the Durham Police and Crime Commissioner Ron Hogg, cannabis policing was relaxed with users only being arrested for growing plants commercially or smoking weed in a "blatant" way. Fisher maintained a good relationship with Hogg, and the local Cleveland Police, and the club's focus on harm reduction enabled it to operate it with police support. The club has also received support from other senior police figures such as Arfon Jones. The club donates a portion of its proceeds to local artists, and has resources to point members to local alcohol and drug support services.

In 2018, the club was featured in the first episode of season four of the Jeremy Kyle documentary series The Kyle Files.

In 2023, the club released a grinder in tribute of Ron Hogg, who had died in 2019.

As of 2024, the club has approximately 850 members.

== See also ==
- Cannabis in Montserrat
