= Bernard Rappaz =

Swiss cannabis farmer

Bernard Rappaz (born 18 February 1953) is a former Swiss farmer from Valais. He was known for his production of cannabis and was nicknamed Hanfbauer (hemp farmer).

== Life ==
In the 1990s, Rappaz began to fight for the liberalization of the hemp trade and consumption. In November 2008 he was found guilty in Martigny Court for hemp grown between 1996 and 2001, violating the controlled substances law and committing money laundering. The police had seized about 50 tons of hemp with him. During the trial, he confessed to having sold five tons and made a total of about five million francs (= approx. 3.5 million euro). He also made claims about "healing powers of marijuana". Rappaz was sentenced to six years in jail. The state's attorney had asked for ten years.

On March 20, 2010, he was imprisoned in Sion. He joined in a hunger strike to protest against what he considered unlawful criminal proceedings against him. He was transferred to the prison wing of Inselspital (University Hospital of Bern). The Conseil d'État Esther Waeber-Kalbermatten ordered a force feeding for the first grant in July 2010. On July 21, the Valais authorities gave him house arrest at his residence in Saxon. For the time being, he ended his hunger strike.

On August 26, 2010, in the Federal Court a public consultation of the judgment dismissed the appeal of Rappaz when his request for a reduced sentence was rejected. decided that the conditions for an interruption of the penitentiary system were not given it. if necessary a force-feeding could be arranged by the prison authority, unless a permanent injury or death of the criminal inmates could not otherwise be averted. Affiliated Rappaz was transferred to jail, where he again joined in a hunger strike. A further appeal against the denial of detention under breakage after 77 days of a hunger strike refused the Valais cantonal court on November 11, 2010.

On November 18, 2010, a pardon was rejected by members of the Pennine great Council in an election.

According to media reports from the 23rd December 2010 Rappaz has decided to end his hunger strike (at times with salt, vitamins and sugared tea) after 120 days to December 24. This was on the advice of the European Court of Human Rights, that he had turned down, after he failed at all domestic instances. The Court had rejected Rappaz' demand for immediate action and requires him to break his hunger strike during the procedure.

In May 2011, Rappaz was sentenced to an additional term of imprisonment of one year without probation. The Court found him of money laundering, of violating the Narcotics Law and document forgery. Rappaz' defender announced appeal.

== See also ==
- Agriculture in Switzerland
