= Drugs, Habits and Social Policy =

- Discipline: Drugs, alcohol, Health and Social Care
- Language: English
- Edited by: Axel Klein, Blaine Stothard

Publication details
- Former name(s): Drug and Alcohol Professional; Drugs and Alcohol Today
- History: 2001–present
- Publisher: Emerald Group Publishing
- Frequency: Quarterly

Standard abbreviations
- ISO 4: Drugs Habits Soc. Policy

Indexing
- ISSN: 2752-6739 (print); 2752-6747 (web)
- LCCN: 2023228203
- OCLC no.: 1340044557

Links
- Journal homepage; Latest issues

Drugs, Habits and Social Policy is a double-blind peer-reviewed academic journal covering latest research about the health, social and policy components of recreational drug and alcohol uses, and related fields. Scholarly pieces, research summaries, and critical reviews are all published in the publication. The journal has played a role in the diffusion of research related to drug laws and drug policy as well as alcohol use.

The journal was initially known as The Drug and Alcohol Professional (2001–2003) and edited by David B. Cooper. In 2004, with Gary Hayes as editor, the journal was renamed Drugs and Alcohol Today, a name that was kept until 2021. In 2022, the name was changed to Drugs, Habits and Social Policy.

The journal is edited by Axel Klein and Blaine Stothard, published by Emerald Group Publishing. It is available for subscription and also as part of an online subscription to the Emerald Insights Collection. The journal was indexed in Scopus from 2001 to 2022.
