= NORML UK =

Organisation

- Founded: 2012
- Purpose: Legalisation of cannabis in the United Kingdom.
- Location: Totnes, UK
- Region served: United Kingdom
- Website: NORML-UK.org

NORML UK is the United Kingdom branch of the National Organization for the Reform of Marijuana Laws, a cannabis legalisation campaign organisation. NORML UK was founded in 2012. Their mission statement is "NORML UK demands the right to pursue peaceful activities with cannabis without unnecessary intervention from the authorities." Similar affiliated organisations operate under the NORML banner in other countries like South Africa, New Zealand and France.

== See also ==
- Cannabis in the United Kingdom
- Cannabis Law Reform
- Drug policy reform
- Release
