= L'Esprit frappeur =

French publishing house

L'Esprit frappeur (French for "ghost" or "poltergeist"), is a French publishing house, specialized in low-cost books. Before the change to euros, it used to sell its books for 10 or 20 Francs; they now cost between 2,5 euros and 5 euros. L'Esprit frappeur edits many texts more or less censored for economic or political reasons by larger companies.

== A few books published by L'Esprit frappeur ==
- Daniel Defoe, Libertalia, une utopie pirate (French extract of "Histoire générale des plus fameux pirates"), ISBN 2-84405-058-1
- Jean-Luc Einaudi and Maurice Rajsfus, Les Silences de la police - 16 juillet 1942, 17 octobre 1961, 2001, ISBN 2-84405-173-1 (about the 1942 Vel' d'Hiv Roundup and the 1961 Paris massacre)
- Subcomandante Marcos, Contes Maya, 2001
- Jacques Morel, Calendrier des crimes de la France outre-mer, 2001
- Benjamin Sehene, Fire under the Cassock, 2005, ISBN 2-84405-222-3 (about the 1994 Rwandan genocide)
