= European Coalition for Just and Effective Drug Policies =

European network of organisations and citizens

ENCOD (European coalition for just and effective drug policies)
- Abbreviation: ENCOD
- Formation: 1994
- Type: NGO
- Purpose: Drugs and drug policy reform in Europe.
- Headquarters: Antwerp, Belgium
- Region served: Europe
- Steering Committee: Rotating yearly
- Main organ: ENCOD monthly bulletin
- Website: encod.org

The European Coalition for Just and Effective Drug Policies (ENCOD), originally European NGO Council On Drugs and development, is a network of European non-governmental organisations and citizens concerned with the impact of current international drug policies on the lives of the most affected sectors in Europe and the Global South. Since 1994 they have been working to advocate more just and effective drugs control policies, which include an integrated solution for all problems related to the global drugs phenomenon.

== History ==
ENCOD was set up in 1993 thanks to the support of the European Commission, as an NGO counterpart to the European Monitoring Centre on Drugs and Drug Addiction. However, the Management Board of the EMCDDA later decided to ignore any NGO involvement in the work of the EMCDDA.

In 1998 a Manifesto for just and effective drug policies was redacted by 14 NGOs from Europe, Africa and South America, then signed by hundreds of organizations, companies, political parties, and citizens.

ENCOD is a self-financed and independent network, legally based in Belgium, and is steered by a Committee composed citizens from different EU countries (5 people after the 2013 General assembly).

== Mission ==
The organization declares three primary objectives:

- To improve understanding of the causes and effects of the drugs trade,
- To contribute to the elaboration of just and effective drugs control policies,
- To bring about greater consistency between drugs control efforts and economic and social policies.

ENCOD is implementing these objectives in three ways:

- it facilitates coordination, information exchange and joint analysis between its members,
- it carries out joint information campaigns, aimed at the general public,
- it carries out joint advocacy activities, aimed at policy-makers and the media.

== Activities ==
=== Advising and organizational activities ===
- In 1998, publication of the Manifesto for just and effective drug policies
- Annual participation in the round table organized by the Commission on narcotic drugs (CND)
- In 2006 ENCOD organised with the support of the Greens–European free alliance and European united left a meeting in the European Parliament in Brussels
- From 7 to 9 March 2008 ENCOD co-organised an international meeting in Vienna for a European alternative in drug policies called Drug Peace Days
- In the early 2000s, setup of the Cannabis Social Club concept and rules
- Advise and counselling about drug policies possible changes.
- In March 2014, participation in the annual meeting of the Commission on narcotic drugs (CND). Set up of an alternative press center during the meeting.

=== Public campaigns ===
- In 2003, 'Spread the Seeds' campaign
- Series of Conferences at the United Nations Office on Drugs and Crime: "Vienna 2003: a Chance for the World" (March 2003), "The Road to Vienna" (November 2006).
- In 2009, conference "Coca 2009, from persecution to proposal" on the possibilities of a European approach towards the coca leaf, at the European Parliament.
- In 2011, publication of the Code of conduct for a European Cannabis Social Club, the basic structural rules of non-prifot and transparency, that were used by many Cannabis social clubs in Spain, Belgium, Czech Republic, United Kingdom, France etc.
- In 2013 and 2014, European campaign for the elections to European Parliament "Manifesto for safe and healthy drug policies in Europe".

== See also ==
- Cannabis Social Club
- Drug policy reform
- Drug liberalization — drugs legalization — drugs decriminalization
- Prohibition (drugs) — drug prohibition law — arguments for and against drug prohibition
- War on drugs
- Harm reduction
- School district drug policies
- FAAAT think & do tank
- Students for Sensible Drug Policy
