= Cannabis Social Club =

Non-profit industry model for recreational cannabis

A Cannabis Social Club (CSC), sometimes called Cannabis Club, Cannabis Association, or Teapad, is a type of cannabis retail outlet, an industry model for regulated cannabis organised as non-profit cooperatives in which cannabis is cultivated, shared, and enjoyed collectively, usually for the purpose of relaxing or for social communion.

These places differ from standard cannabis dispensaries, or Dutch coffeeshops, in that those are operating in a for-profit basis open to all adults, whereas Cannabis Clubs operate on non-profit grounds and only allow access to registered members. Research suggests that CSCs can have positive outcomes in terms of public health and harm reduction.

== History ==
=== 1920s and the early concept in Northern America ===
Cannabis consumers clubs became popular in the United States during the Prohibition era (1920–1933). Cannabis was often used as a legal intoxicant since alcohol was illegal. Teapads were developed as clubs in urban areas where jazz music was performed and cannabis was consumed.

Teapads usually catered to those in the jazz scene and were usually furnished comfortably, often playing jazz music. Music in homage from these clubs arose; Gene Krupa even composed an entire album named "Teapad Songs Volume 1".

These clubs disappeared after cannabis became illegal, although some groups (such as the early San Francisco Cannabis Buyers Club) continued to operate a model with similar tenets.

=== 2000s and the European model ===
During the 1990s and early 2000s, an important number of "cannabis users associations" appeared in Spain, mostly the Basque country and Catalonia regions. Many of these Spanish groups were members of the pan-European non-government organization ENCOD which coined the expression Cannabis Social Club in 2005, as a way to better describe the conceptual economic and organizational model of these groups, associating it with the ethos of non-profit cooperatives. The term was also thought as a way to enable the normalization of this model for the legal production and distribution of cannabis for adults.

Cannabis Social Clubs as developed in Spain are non-commercial organizations which organize the professional, collective cultivation of very limited amounts of cannabis, just enough to cover the personal needs of their club members.

Cultivation, transport, distribution and consumption are subject to security and quality checks, and are done without publicity or advertisement of any kind. The members finance the system by subscriptions, according to their needs. Each member gets a value card with units, according to their credit, with a maximum limit per month and per year. The members are prohibited from reselling any cannabis obtained from the club, and are required to ensure that it is not consumed by minors. In their European Cannabis Social Club Guidelines, ENCOD explains:

CSCs are characterised by transparency, democracy and non-profitability. They function as an association, with complete openness about financial arrangements to their members, so the members can see how the costs are calculated and the money is spent. CSC's organise a general assembly at least once a year, where annual reports are discussed and approved. These reports include a full balance of income and expenses in the past fiscal year, according to the rules established for this purpose. A CSC is not a business in which there are economic benefits that are used for personal profit. The benefits are not shared between the partners, and therefore, it could be less attractive to criminal structures. Unlike cannabis distributors who operate on the illegal market, CSC's are willing to enter into dialogue with authorities to provide insight into their working methods, in the framework of the elaboration of regulation of cannabis.

In contrast to the Cannabis Buyers Club, a CSC are not limited to medical-only use. In the United States, Cannabis Social Clubs often do not allow the dispensation of cannabis products onsite, but only allow consumption. They are sometimes referred to as Cannabis Consumption Clubs.

=== 2010s onwards: enactment into national laws ===
While Cannabis Social Clubs have long been informally organized, and subject to legal uncertainty, this situation started to change in the mid-2010s, with the first enactment of the Cannabis Social Club model into laws.

==== Uruguay ====
In 2014, Uruguay adopted a law legalizing non-medical cannabis use and production under different dispositions, one of them allowing up to 45 citizens to create a not-for-profit organization to cultivate up to 99 plants and share the harvest among themselves. In the Uruguayan Law, Article 28 establishes:

"The Institute for the Regulation and Control of Cannabis shall have the following powers: [...] D) Authorize cannabis membership clubs pursuant to the legal provisions in force and related regulations."

Further disposition establish that "Membership clubs shall have a minimum of fifteen and a maximum of forty-five members. They may grow up to ninety-nine cannabis plants of psychoactive use and obtain as product of the crop a maximum annual storage proportional to the number of members and in accordance with the quantities specified for the non-medicinal use of psychoactive cannabis."

==== Spain ====
In 2017, the Parliament of Catalonia adopted a law regulating cannabis social clubs in that Spanish autonomous community. However, the law was cancelled a few months after its entry into force, leaving Catalan cannabis social clubs (like in other parts of Spain) in a legal grey zone. In 2023, relying on this lack of legal certainty, the Mayor of Barcelona initiated a campaign of closure of the city's cannabis clubs.

==== Malta ====
In December 2021, the Parliament of Malta adopted Bill No. 241 which creates the "Authority on the Responsible Use of Cannabis" and, in its Article 7A, authorizes Cannabis Social Clubs:

"it shall be permissible to establish, and an individual may be a member of, an organisation the membership of which shall consist only of individuals in their personal capacity and acting only in their own name the only purpose of which being the cultivation of the plant cannabis exclusively for its members in a collective manner to distribute it only to those members".

CSCs in Malta are able to provide their members with up to 7 grammes (1/4 oz) per day, with a maximum of 50 grammes (1 3/4 oz) per month.

==== South Africa ====
In South Africa, after a 2018 Constitutional Court ruling decriminalising personal activities, CSCs have unfolded under the name of Dagga Private Clubs; however, they remain in a legally grey area.

==== Switzerland ====
Although not legally-regulated as such, an experimental protocol allowing to develop Cannabis Clubs managed by universities, local authorities, research institutes, associations or foundations. Pilot trials can be set up between 2021 and 2031, as enacted by Switzerland in 2021. In early 2022, pilot trials with different modalities were approved in the cities of Basel, Lausanne and Zurich.

==== Germany ====
Members of a Cannabis Social Club in Germany are able to purchase up to 25 grams (7/8 oz) of cannabis each day, but no more than 50 grams (1 3/4 oz) in a single month. The legal limit of members in Germany was proposed to be 500. Non-profit cannabis social clubs in Germany are due to be legalised on 1 July 2024. Membership of cannabis social clubs in Germany are legal for adult residents of Germany and have a maximum membership number of 500. Cannabis social clubs in Germany will also require permits. The clubs are restricted to growing and distributing cannabis on a strictly not-for-profit basis.

== Cannabis Social Clubs throughout the world ==
=== Cannabis clubs regulated by law ===
- Malta, which adopted in December 2021 a law regulating Cannabis Social Clubs.
- Switzerland: In 2016 four Swiss cities agreed to establish pilot cannabis clubs. The pilot trial started in 2022 and could run until May 2031.
- Uruguay, which adopted a law regulating Cannabis Social Clubs between 15 and 45 members in 2014.
- Germany, which legalized legally regulated Cannabis Social Clubs in July 2024.

=== Cannabis clubs operating in legal grey areas ===
- Austria,
- Belgium,
- the Netherlands,
- Slovenia,
- South Africa,
- Spain: as of 2019, the concentration of cannabis social clubs in Spain was located in Catalonia with more than 200 cannabis clubs in the area of Barcelona alone.
- United States:
  - Colorado's Amendment 64 allowed the creation of Cannabis consumption clubs, although the sale or dispensation of cannabis products is not permitted onsite. Consumption regulations varies by county: many have adopted some sort of regulation allowing cannabis consumption clubs to operate throughout the State (iBAKE Denver, the Speakeasy Vape Lounge, etc.).
  - Oregon allows Cannabis Social Clubs under Measure 91, with some clubs operating (World Famous Cannabis Cafe, NW Cannabis Club, etc.).
  - Nevada's 2017 Senate Bill 236 allows businesses to apply for so-called "Cannabis Social Club" licences, although different from the defining characteristics of Cannabis Social Clubs (the non-profit model).
  - Conversely, the District of Columbia passed regulation in 2016 banning Cannabis Consumption Clubs.
  - Massachusetts’ Question 4 ballot question (that passed in 2016) allows for what the state calls “Social Consumption Establishments”. The Massachusetts Cannabis Control Commission approved three new social consumption license types on December 11, 2025. The license types are meant to have either standalone events, such as a music festival, or to supplement an existing license with additional streams of revenue, such as a cultivation facility or product manufacturer. The model is for-profit.

== Public health impacts ==
The organization ENCOD claims that CSCs "apply an active policy of prevention of harms and risks and promotion of safer methods of consumption of cannabis by its members" and indeed research findings suggests that CSCs could have positive outcomes in terms of public health, although this is not necessarily always the case in practice. In 2021, a study found "some significant gaps in providing information on risk and harm reduction, in offering health support services for general members and also in applying lab-tests on the actual cannabis being used at the CSC" pointing at the "relationship between organizational and structural factors defining the Clubs and their harm reduction practices" as the underlying cause, as well as the grey legal area and absence of regulations in which the clubs often operate.

The specific organizational modalities of different cannabis social club' models and "auto-regulatory agency" can play an important role in shaping a model reducing the risks associated with cannabis use and possible use disorders.

The club model has also shown to be a potential vector for harm reduction strategies and prevention campaigns. In addition, the "social" aspect of the club model has been pointed out as a vector for peer-led prevention early on.

== See also ==
- Legality of cannabis
- Drug policy
- Cannabis shop
- Private members' club
- San Francisco Cannabis Buyers Club
- Social club
- ENCOD
- Cannabis in Spain, section on Cannabis social clubs
- Allotment (gardening); quite similar except that any crop can be grown in these (not just cannabis)
