= Cannabis in the Collectivity of Saint Martin =

Cannabis is illegal in Saint Martin for personal use. Limited types of cannabis-derived products are permitted for medical uses. As an overseas collectivity of France, Saint Martin is subject to French law and all international conventions signed by France.

== See also ==
- Cannabis in France
- Hemp in France
