= View of Rochefort Harbour from the Magasin des Colonies =

Painting by Claude-Joseph Vernet

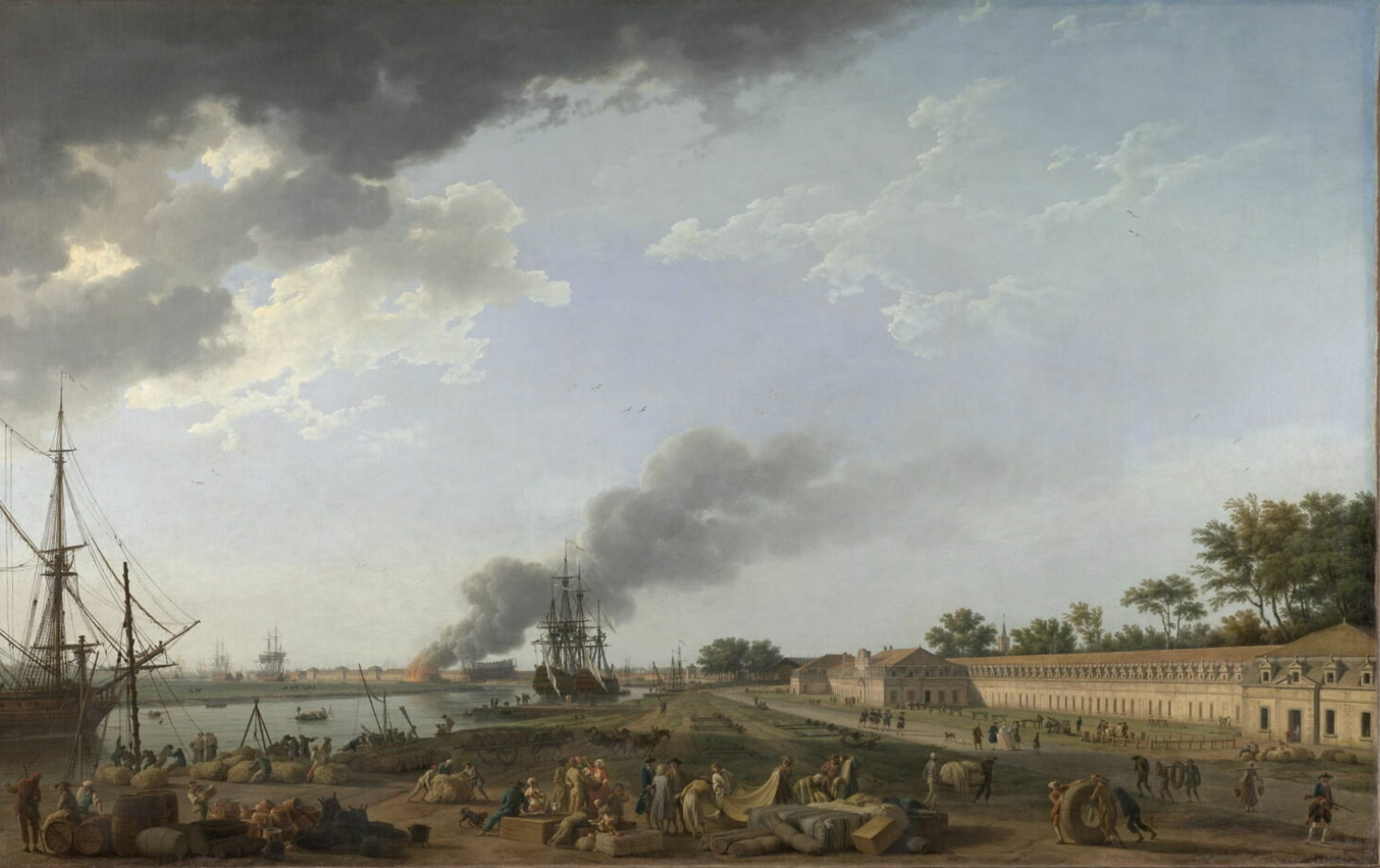
- Artist: Claude-Joseph Vernet
- Year: 1762
- Type: Oil on canvas, landscape painting
- Dimensions: 165 cm × 263 cm (65 in × 104 in)
- Location: Louvre; Paris

View of Rochefort Harbour from the Magasin des Colonies (French: Vue du Port de Rochefort, prise du Magasin des Colonies) is an oil on canvas landscape painting by the French artist Claude-Joseph Vernet, from 1762. It is held at the Louvre, in Paris.

== History and description ==
It depicts a view of the port of Rochefort on the Atlantic coast of France. The view is taken from the Magasin des Colonies, a large warehouse that serviced the colonial port's trade with France's Empire. It focuses on the harbour and Rochefort Arsenal with the town itself represented only the bell tower of the church of Saint Louis. The Royal Ropeworks are on the right. The city had been subject to an unsuccessful British attack five years earlier during the Seven Years' War.

The picture was produced as part Vernet's celebrated Views of the Ports of France series commissioned by Louis XV which included fourteen works. Despite being one of the less obviously picturesque locations in the series, due to the low-lying terrain, Vernet achieved success by use of billowing smoke against an atmospheric sky. It was praised by critics for its naturalism. It was exhibited at the Salon of 1763. Today the painting is in the collection of the Louvre in Paris although on display at the Musée national de la Marine.

== Bibliography ==
- Conisbee, Philip. Claude-Joseph Vernet, 1714-1789. Greater London Council, 1976.
- Levey, Michael. Painting and Sculpture in France, 1700-1789. Yale University Press, 1993.
- Manoeuvre, Laurent Rieth, Eric. Joseph Vernet, 1714-1789: les ports de France. Anthèse, 1994.
- Rodger N.A.M. Command of the Ocean: A Naval History of Britain, 1649-1815. Penguin Books, 2006.
