= Hôtel de Ville, Rochefort =

Town hall in Rochefort, Charente-Maritime, France

Hôtel de Ville
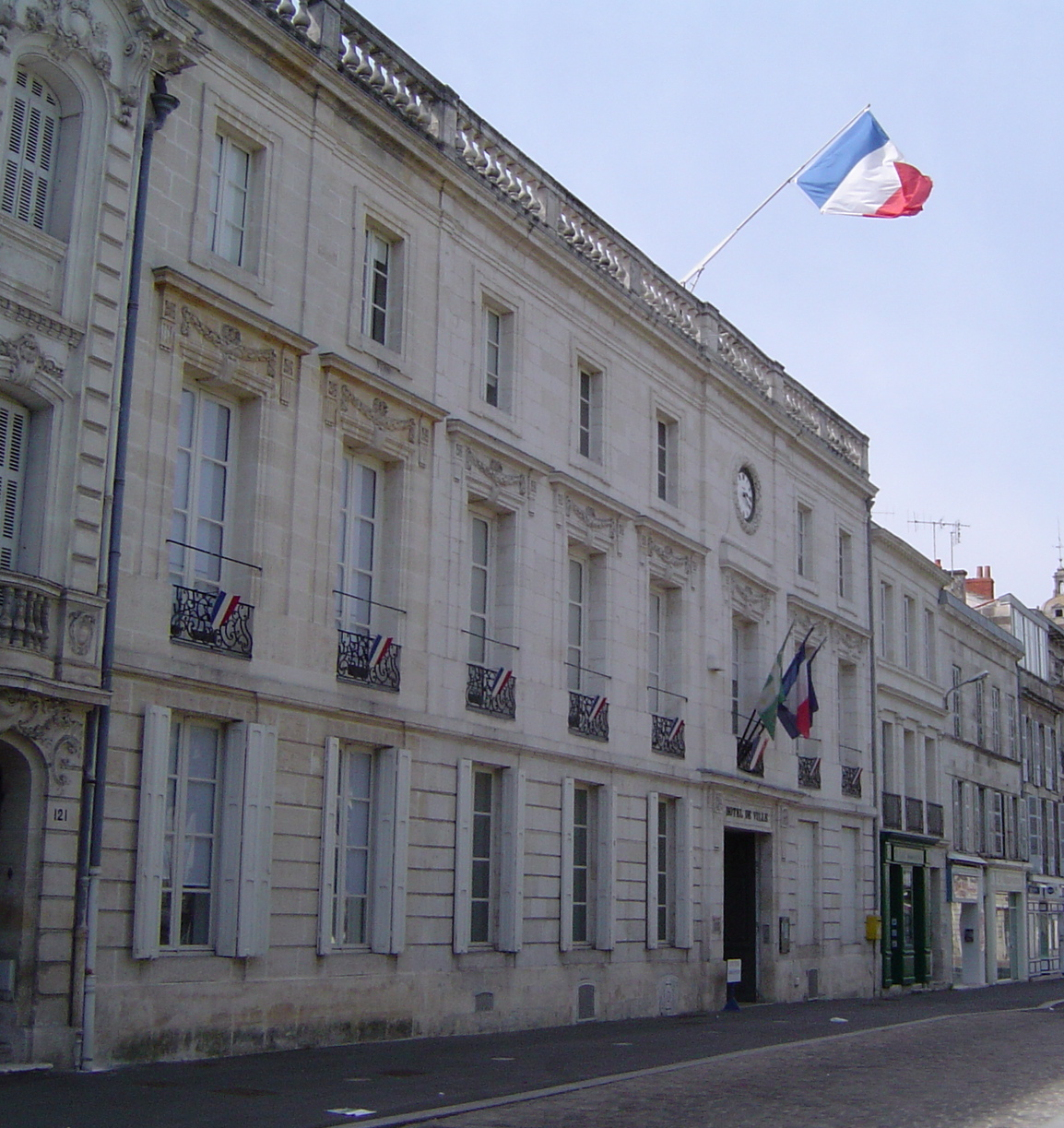
- The main frontage of the Hôtel de Ville in April 2007
- Interactive map of the Hôtel de Ville area

General information
- Type: City hall
- Architectural style: Neoclassical style
- Location: Rochefort, France
- Coordinates: 45.9367°N 0.9624°W
- Completed: 1770

The Hôtel de Ville (French pronunciation: [otɛl də vil], City Hall) is a municipal building in Rochefort, Charente-Maritime, in western France, standing on Place Colbert.

== History ==
The building, initially known as the Hôtel d'Amblimont, was commissioned by a French naval officer, Claude-Marguerite Renart de Fuchsamberg, 3rd Marquis d'Amblimont, for use as his private residence. The site he selected was on the west side of the main square, also known as Place des Capucins (now Place Colbert). The house was designed in the neoclassical style, built in ashlar stone and was completed in 1770. (Note: Some sources, including a plaque on the building installed in around 1983, suggest that the building was commissioned by the marquis's grandfather, Thomas-Claude Renart de Fuchsamberg Amblimont, 1st Marquis d'Amblimont in the late 17th century. The elder Fuchsamberg was notable for his defence of Fort-de-France in Martinique against the forces of Michiel de Ruyter during the Anglo-Dutch wars. Council officers now believe the house was completed nearly a century later i.e. in around 1770.)

Fuchsamberg abandoned the house when he emigrated to Spain in the early 1790s to escape persecution during the French Revolution. He subsequently joined the Spanish Navy but was killed by a cannonball during the Battle of Cape St. Vincent in February 1797 during the War of the First Coalition. The house was subsequently seized by the state as biens nationaux. The emperor, Napoleon, allowed Fuchsamberg's daughter, Beatrix Étiennette, to recover the house in 1801, and she sold it to the sub-prefect, Philippe Augier de La Sauzaye. The town council led by the mayor, Pierre André Hèbre de Saint-Clément, then acquired the house for FFr 40,000 in 1804.

The design involved an asymmetrical main frontage of six bays facing onto the square. The fourth bay on the left, which was slightly projected forward, featured a square-headed doorway with a cornice on the ground floor, a French door with a keystone, garlands and a cornice on the first floor, and a blind wall on the second floor. The other bays were fenestrated in a similar style and, at roof level, there a fine Italianate style balustrade. A clock was installed in the blind wall on the second floor in 1880.

After German Forces occupied the town on 23 June 1940, during the Second World War, the town hall became the German command post and a swastika flew over the building. Following the liberation of the town on 12 September 1944, a column of soldiers from the French Forces of the Interior marched past the town hall.

The building was extended to the south by two extra bays in a similar style in 1965. Internally, the principal rooms were the Salle des Mariages (wedding room) on the ground floor and the Salle du Conseil (council chamber) and the Bureau du Maire (mayor's parlour) on the first floor. The mayor's parlour was used in the dance scenes for the musical film, The Young Girls of Rochefort, starring Catherine Deneuve, in 1967.
