= Hemp paper =

Thin sheets made of cannabis sativa

Hemp paper is a paper variety consisting exclusively or to a large extent from pulp obtained from fibers of industrial hemp. The products are mainly specialty papers such as cigarette paper, banknotes and technical filter papers. Compared to wood pulp, hemp pulp offers a four to five times longer fibre, a significantly lower lignin fraction as well as a higher tear resistance and tensile strength. Because the paper industry's processes have been optimized for wood as the feedstock, production costs currently are much higher than for paper from wood.

== History ==
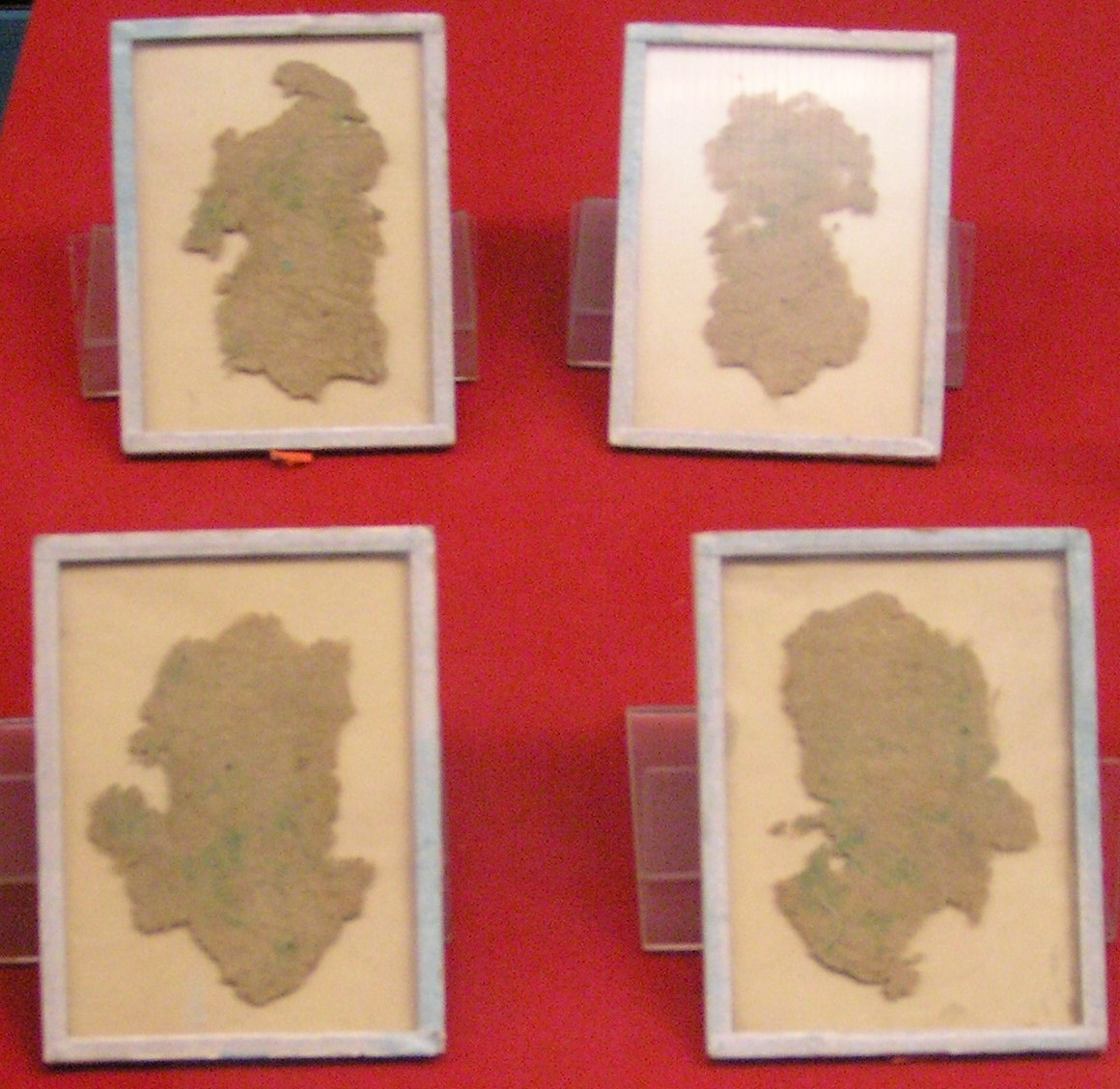
Wrapping paper with hemp fiber excavated from the Han Tomb of Wu Di (140–87 BC) at Baqiao, Xi'An

The first identified coarse paper, made from hemp, dates to the early Western Han dynasty, 200 years before the nominal invention of papermaking by Cai Lun, who improved and standardized paper production using a range of inexpensive materials, including hemp ends, around 2000 years ago. Recycled hemp clothing, rags, and fishing nets were used as inputs for paper production. By the sixth century AD, the papermaking process spread to Korea, where cannabis had been used previously for thousands of years, and Japan, where cannabis had been used for 10,000 years.

=== Early Western use ===
Hemp paper only reached Europe in the 13th century via the Middle East. In Germany it was used for the first time in the 14th century. It was not until the 19th century that methods were established for the production of paper from wood pulp, which were not necessarily cheaper than the hemp paper production but did not need extra production because wood was already there ready to be harvested, above all, repressed in the area of writing and printing papers.

The Saint Petersburg, Russia, paper mill of Goznak opened in 1818. It used hemp as its main input material. Paper from the mill was used in the printing of "bank notes, stamped paper, credit bills, postal stamps, bonds, stocks, and other watermarked paper."

=== 20th century ===
In 1916, U.S. Department of Agriculture chief scientists Lyster Hoxie Dewey and Jason L. Merrill created paper made from hemp pulp and concluded that paper from hemp hurds was "favorable in comparison with those used with pulp wood." The chemical composition of hemp hurds is similar to that of wood, making hemp a good choice as a raw material for manufacturing paper. A later book about hemp and other fibers by the same L.H. Dewey (1943) has no words about hemp as a raw material for the production of paper. Dried hemp has about 57% cellulose (the principal ingredient in paper), compared to about 40–50% in wood. Hemp also has the advantage of a lower lignin content: hemp contains only 5–24% lignin against the 20–35% found in wood. This lignin must be removed chemically and wood requires more use of chemicals in the process. The actual production of hemp fiber in the U.S. continued to decline until 1933 to around 500 tonnes per year. Between 1934 and 1935, the cultivation of hemp began to increase, but still at a very low level and with no significant increase of paper from hemp.

After the Second World War, industrial hemp was only grown on micro-plots. Although the industrial hemp bred in the 1950s and 1960s almost completely lacks THC, cultivation has been banned in many countries in recent decades. In Germany, growing hemp was completely prohibited between 1982 and 1995 by the Narcotic Drugs Act in order to prevent the illegal use of cannabis as a narcotic. Especially in France, the varieties of hemp used for the manufacture of cigarette paper were still in use and grown (see Hemp in France). As of 1994, most of the French hemp crop was used to make rolling paper, currency, and high quality paper for Bibles (India paper).

== Fiber sources ==
Before the industrialisation of paper production the most common fibre source was recycled fibres from used textiles, called rags. The rags were from hemp, linen and cotton. A process for removing printing inks from recycled paper was invented by German jurist Justus Claproth in 1774. Today this method is called deinking. It was not until the introduction of wood pulp in 1843 that paper production was not dependent on recycled materials from ragpickers.

== Contemporary ==
Currently there is a small niche market for hemp pulp, for example as cigarette paper. Hemp fiber is mixed with fiber from other sources than hemp. In 1994 there was no significant production of 100% true hemp paper. World hemp pulp production was believed to be around 120,000 tons per year in 1991 which was about 0.05% of the world's annual pulp production volume. The total world production of hemp fiber had in 2003 declined to about 60,000 from 80,000 tons. This can be compared to a typical pulp mill for wood fiber, which is never smaller than 250,000 tons per annum. The cost of hemp pulp is approximately six times that of wood pulp, mostly because of the small size and outdated equipment of the few hemp processing plants in the Western world, and because hemp is harvested once a year (during August) and needs to be stored to feed the mill the whole year through. This storage requires a lot of (mostly manual) handling of the bulky stalk bundles. Another issue is that the entire hemp plant cannot be economically prepared for paper production. While the wood products industry uses nearly 100% of the fiber from harvested trees, only about 25% of the dried hemp stem—the bark, called bast—contains the long, strong fibers desirable for paper production. All this accounts for a high raw material cost. Hemp pulp is bleached with hydrogen peroxide, a process today also commonly used for wood pulp.

=== Market share ===
The use of hemp fiber for paper production represented 90% of the (legal) use of hemp in Europe at the end of the 1990s, with the release of the cultivation of industrial hemp in other parts of Europe in recent years, the share of the increase in other types of use (textiles, natural fiber reinforced plastics) is currently around 70–80% and is still the most important hemp product line in Europe. Today, hemp is used for cigarette paper among other things in Spain and in United Kingdom.

Around the year 2000, the production volume for flax and hemp pulp totalled 25,000 to 30,000 tonnes per year, which was produced from about 37,000 to 45,000 tonnes of fibers. Up to 80% of the produced pulp is used for specialty papers (including 95% cigarette paper). Only about 20% goes into the standard pulp area and are here in mostly lower quality wood pulp (unpurified tow with high hurd content). In the case of hemp pulp alone, the proportion of specialty papers is probably around 99%. The market is considered to be saturated, so no or only low growth in this area is predicted.

=== Costs ===
Production costs are about five times higher than for paper from wood since the infrastructure for using hemp is underdeveloped. For the most part, hemp paper is used for specialty applications and not for mass applications such as printing, writing and packaging paper. If the paper industry were to switch from wood to hemp for sourcing its cellulose fibers, the following benefits could be utilized to offset the cost differential:

- Hemp yields three to four times more usable fibre per hectare per annum than forests, and hemp does not need pesticides or herbicides.
- Hemp has a much faster crop yield. It takes about 3–4 months for hemp stalks to reach maturity, while trees can take between 20 and 80 years. Not only does hemp grow at a faster rate, but it also contains a high level of cellulose. This quick return means that paper can be produced at a faster rate if hemp were used in place of wood.
- Hemp paper does not require the use of toxic bleaching or as many chemicals as wood pulp because it can be whitened with hydrogen peroxide. This means using hemp instead of wood for paper would provide significant environmental benefits by ending the creation of chlorine or dioxin runoff.
- Hemp paper can be recycled up to 8 times, compared to just 3 times for paper made from wood pulp.
- Compared to its wood pulp counterpart, paper from hemp fibers resists decomposition and does not yellow or brown with age. It is also one of the strongest natural fibers in the world - one of the reasons for its longevity and durability.
- Several factors favor the increased use of wood substitutes for paper, especially agricultural fibers such as hemp. Deforestation, particularly the destruction of old growth forests, and the world's decreasing supply of wild timber resources are today major ecological concerns. Hemp's use as a wood substitute will contribute to preserving biodiversity.

=== Uses ===
While hemp pulp is most often reserved for specialty grades, it also appears (usually in blends) in some commodity-style papers where a "tree-free" or durability angle is desired.

- Printing – used for small-run or brand-forward print pieces (e.g., marketing collateral and art/brand materials) where a natural tone and tactile sheet are part of the look. Common examples include business cards, brochures, postcards, flyers, and presentation folders. It is commonly blended with other fibres to improve machine runnability and keep costs closer to conventional stocks.
- Writing – used for stationery and premium writing sheets where fold endurance and long-fibre strength are valued. These products frequently emphasize longevity and a distinctive texture rather than bright whiteness.
- Packaging – used for packaging papers and board-like substrates (such as sleeves, inserts, and hang-tag style components) where tear resistance and an environmental narrative are priorities. Hemp content is often incorporated as a reinforcing portion rather than as the sole fibre source.
- Specialty grades – the best-known uses remain in niche papers where specific performance requirements justify the cost (for example, thin papers, security-oriented papers, and technical/filtration applications).

== See also ==
- Banana paper
