= Corderie Royale =

Museum in Rochefort, France

Coordinates: 45.9396°N 0.9557°W

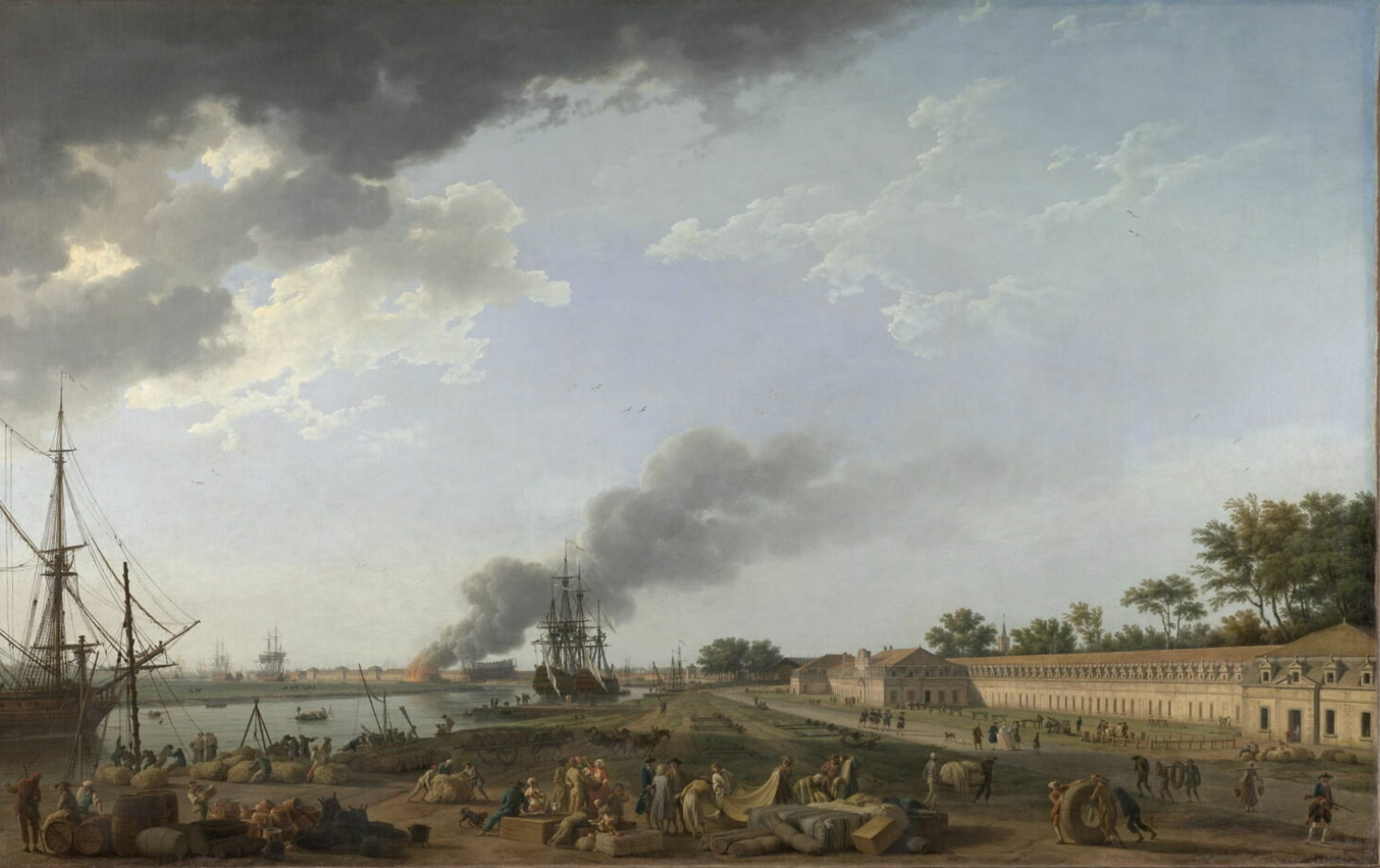
View of Rochefort Harbour from the Magasin des Colonies by Joseph Vernet, 1762. The Corderie Royale is on the right.

The Corderie Royale is a 1666 building originally used for the manufacture of rope for ship rigging but now the centrepiece of the Centre International de la Mer, a vast museum complex located in the heart of the maritime Arsenal de Rochefort. The building has been classified as a historic monument since 1967, and currently a candidate for inscription on the UNESCO World Heritage List.

Since 1986, the part open to visitors has permanent and temporary exhibitions dedicated to the maritime world and the history of the Arsenal de Rochefort.

== Presentation ==
The site of the Corderie Royale, home to the International Sea Centre, is a vast museum space that is part of the Arsenal de Rochefort (Grand Arsenal) in Rochefort, France, the city's historic, cultural and tourist landmark, which also includes the Musée National de la Marine (National Naval Museum), the construction site of the replica of the frigate Hermione, and the renovation project of the Office of the Commissioner of the Navy on Rochefort's food wharf.

It is the city's busiest museum site, receiving more than 50,000 visitors each year.

This exceptional museum complex is mentioned in many tourist guides as well as on the website of the tourist office Rochefort Ocean, Charente-Maritime and Poitou-Charentes.

The Corderie Royale is also part of the historic Route historique des trésors de Saintonge (Saintonge Treasures Route), a tour of the monuments of the former province of Saintonge.

== History ==
=== A grandiose creation ===
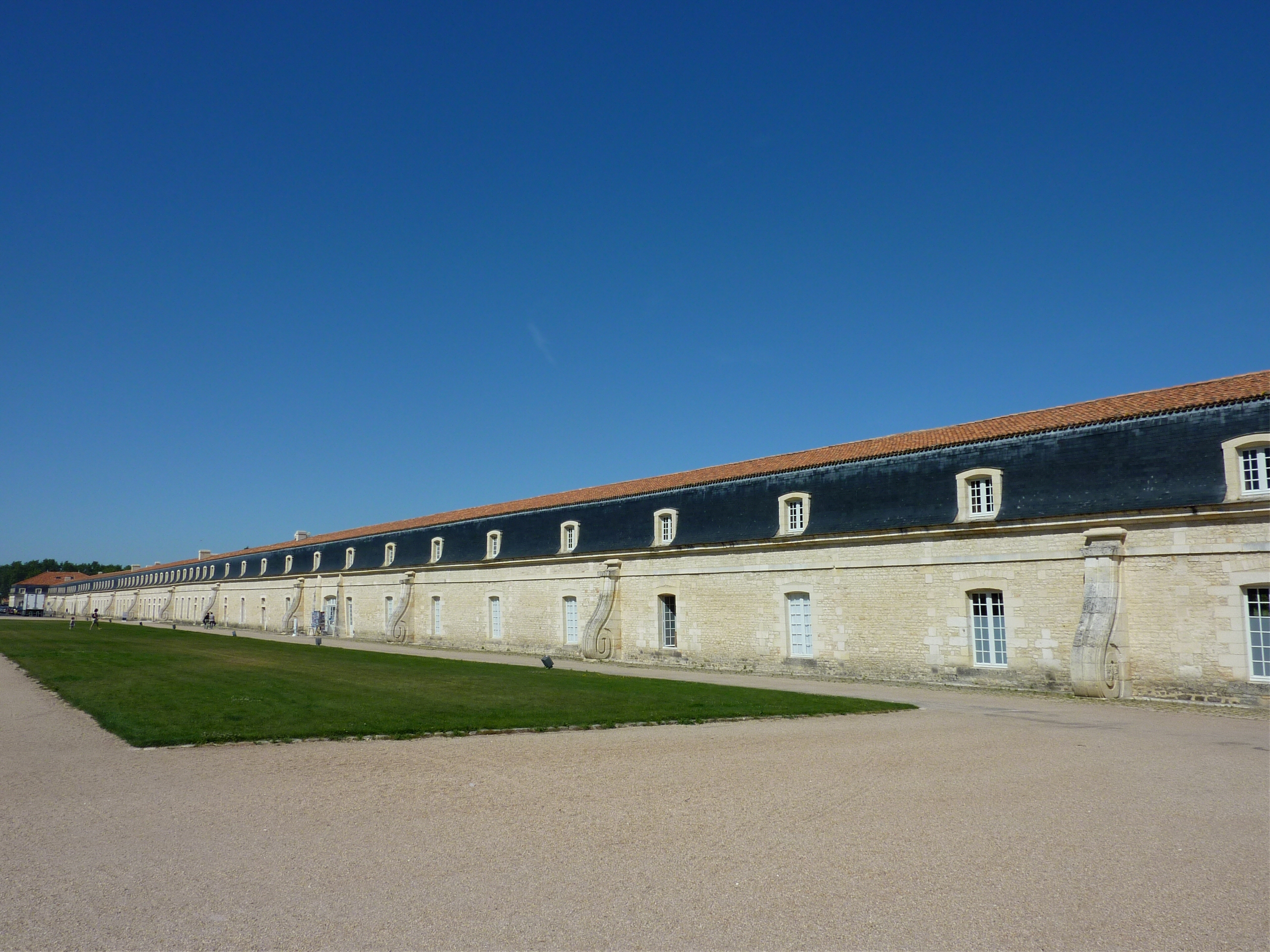
West façade of the Corderie Royale

The Corderie Royale is one of the most important buildings in the arsenal and was one of the first built when the city was founded in 1666. Rochefort is named after the 11th-century village, "Roccafortis". From 1653 to 1660, Jean Colbert du Terron managed Mazarin's affairs in his government of Brouage. He searched the coast for a site to replace this silt port and proposed to his cousin, Jean-Baptiste Colbert, to install a new one in Rochefort, at the mouth of the Charente. The architect of the rope factory was François Blondel who started the work in March. Sent to the Antilles, he could not see the result of his plans.

The realization was not simple because of the terrain. Located on the edge of the Charente, on a ground made up of a layer of mud nearly thirty meters deep, sometimes flooded with about sixty centimeters of water at high tides. Before the building itself was built, it was necessary to raise a few feet and establish a sill plate consisting of a grid of 30 cm section oak pieces 5 feet under the water table.

It was only after the sill plate was completed that construction began, using limestone from quarries near Crazannes. In order not to destabilize this floating raft, construction by the 700 workers was done symmetrically, construction of a higher tier commencing only when the lower sections of wall were completed.

Finally, after more than three years of work, construction was completed in June.

For nearly two hundred years, the building, which is more than 374 metres long, was used to furnish the rigging (or cordage) of the French Navy. The length of the central building corresponded to the manufacture of a rope of a single cable length. The main wing is bounded by two pavilions. To the north, the one for hemp storage and to the south, the one for tarring the rope. The Corderie used French hemp and hemp from Riga at the Baltic Sea to make ropes, the largest of which, when completed, measured a cable, or about 200 metres long. All the steps were taken care of at the arsenal, including tarring to prevent the ropes from rotting at sea.

=== The end of the corderie in 1867 and the conversion of the site ===
In [1867], the rope-makers ceased their activity at the Rochefort site. The building will then be designed to house several institutions:

- An école de maistrance (school of buttrance) and apprentice gunsmiths
- The naval artillery annex
- Maritime work
- The secret archives of the navy
- The museum of scale models

=== The gradual abandonment of the site ===
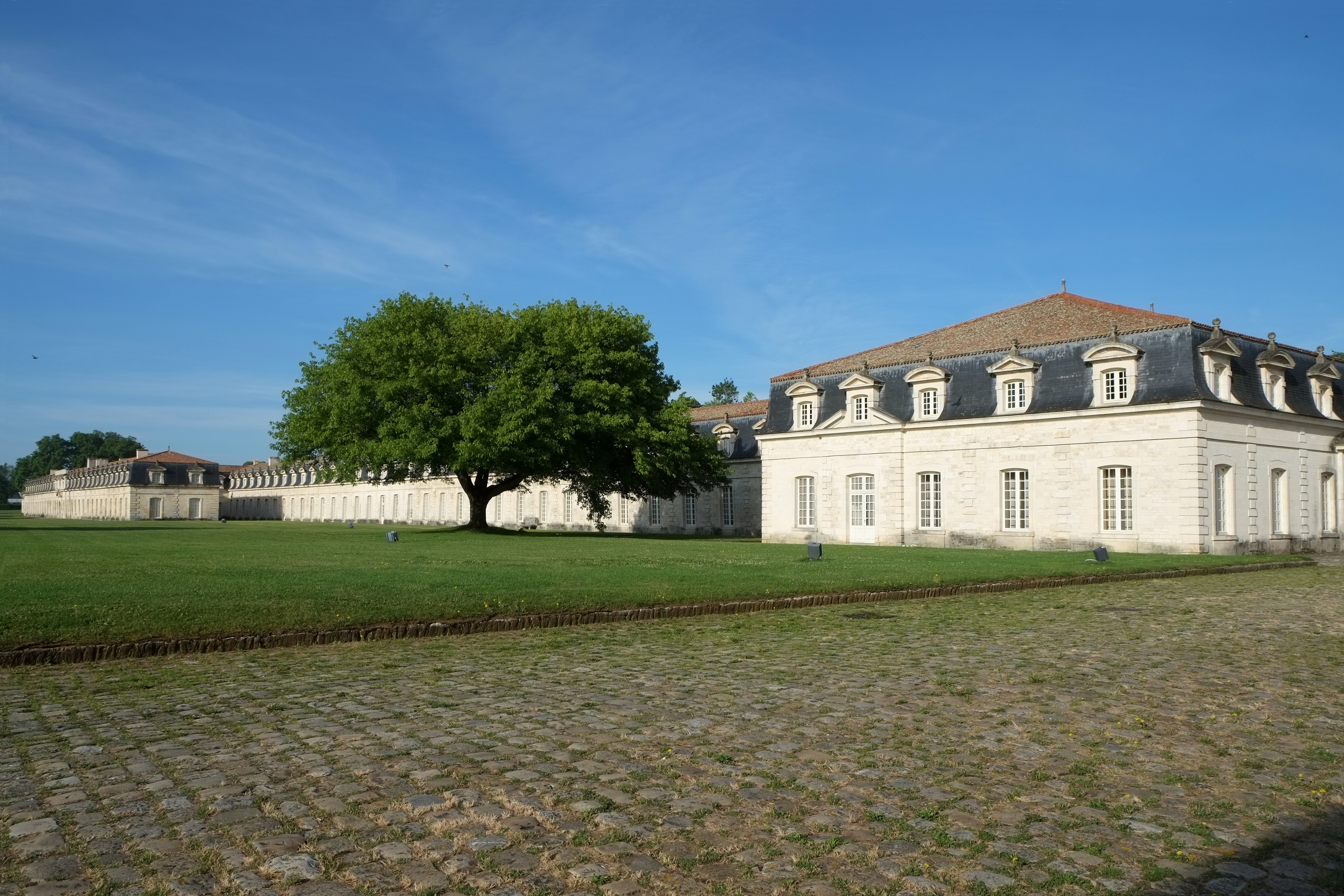
The side of the Corderie Royale facing the river Charente

On the date of 10 September 1926, it was decided to close the Rochefort arsenal, with the consequent gradual abandonment of the Corderie.

The decline of the Corderie was complete when the German occupying forces leaving the city in August 1944 burned down the monument. The fire, which lasted several days, made the building unusable. Left abandoned completely for more than twenty years, the Corderie and its surroundings were completely overrun with brush and brambles. This abundant vegetation jeopardized this remarkable building steeped in the city's history.

In 1964, Admiral Maurice Dupont oversaw the clean-up of the site by military members, and in 1967, the building was declared a historic monument.

The municipality, now the owner of the site, decided in 1974 under the "Medium City" contract to start work on the rehabilitation of the monumental site.

=== The Corderie Royale today ===
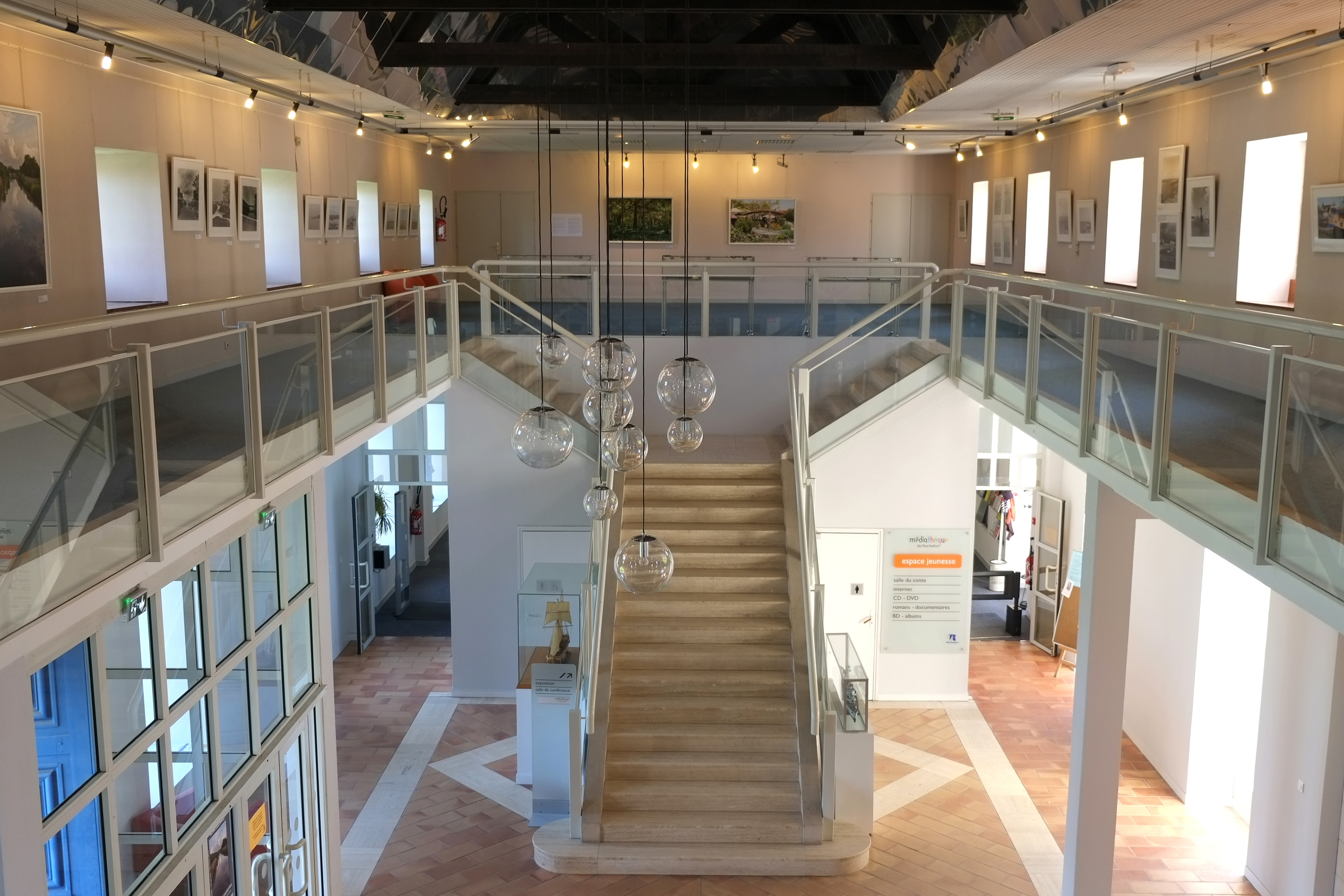
Municipal multimedia library

The building, whose restoration work was begun in 1976 and completed in 1988, made it possible to give the city the "National Grand Heritage Prize". Today, this imposing building houses important administrative and tertiary services:

- In 1980, the national headquarters of the Conservatoire du littoral (Coastal Protection Agency)
- At the end of 1981, the Chamber of Commerce and Industry of Rochefort and Saintonge.
- In 1985, the International Sea Centre
- In 1988, the municipal multimedia library.

The site of the Corderie Royale is decorated with a large park on the edge of the Charente River.

=== The Jardin des Retours and the rigging area ===
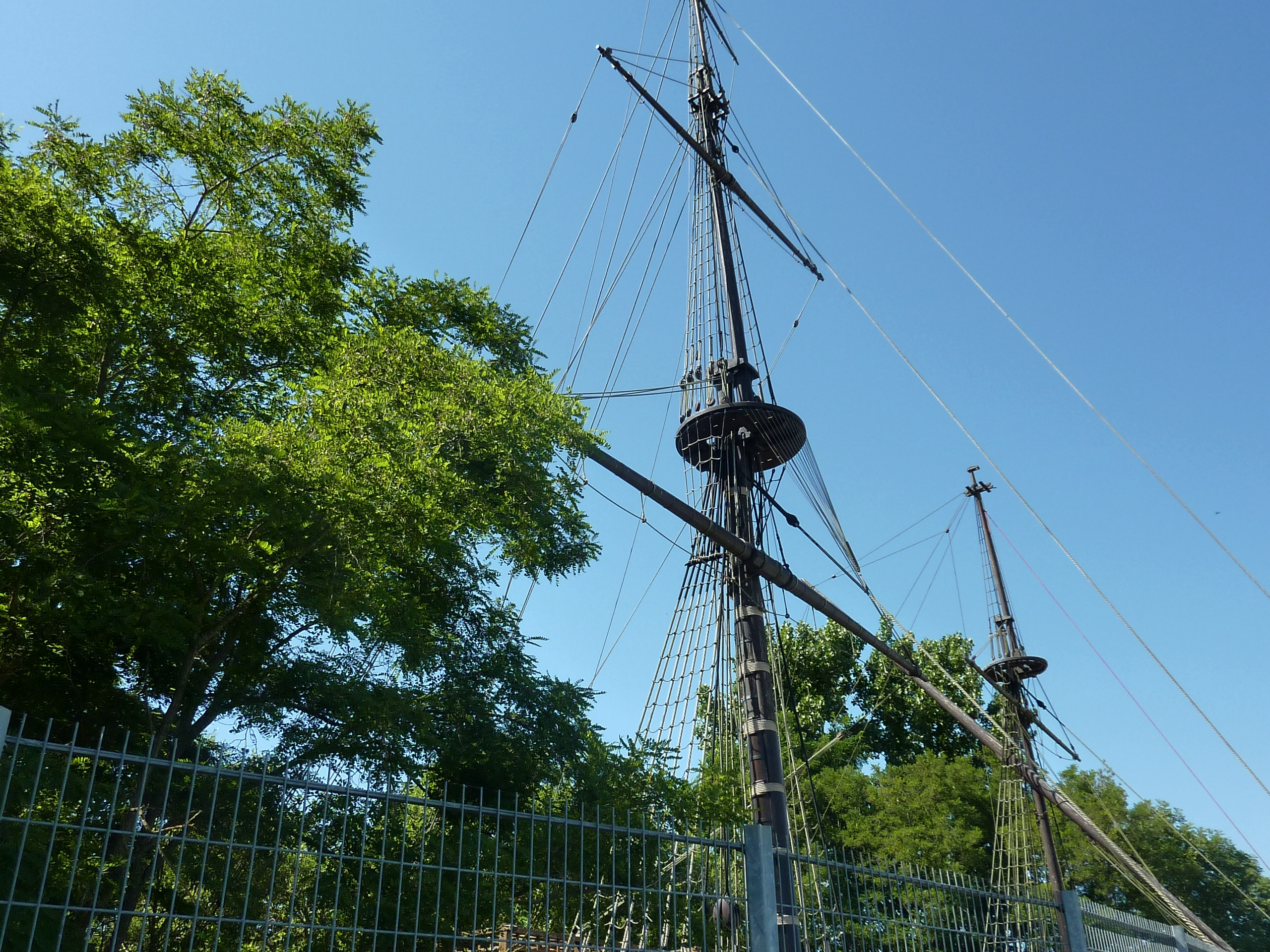
Half-scale rigging in the rigging area

This pleasant park of contemporary creation, inaugurated in 1991 and referred to as jardin des Retours (Garden of Returns), was created to enhance the site of the Corderie Royale.

It is also composed of the 'rigging area' which is cut off on the edge of the Charente, whose aim is to illustrate the theme of ropes and the time of sailing. The Labyrinthe des Batailles Navales (Maze of Naval Battles), made of yew, follows.

This vast garden of rare plants, which stretches over an 18-hectare tree-lined area, has been landscaped as a theatre of greenery, imagined as an introduction to botanical art, and forms a walking space all around the Corderie Royale. It is divided into three large green spaces represented by the Jardin de la Marine (Garden of the Navy), Jardin de la Galissonnière, and Jardin des Amériques (Garden of the Americas).

== Museography ==
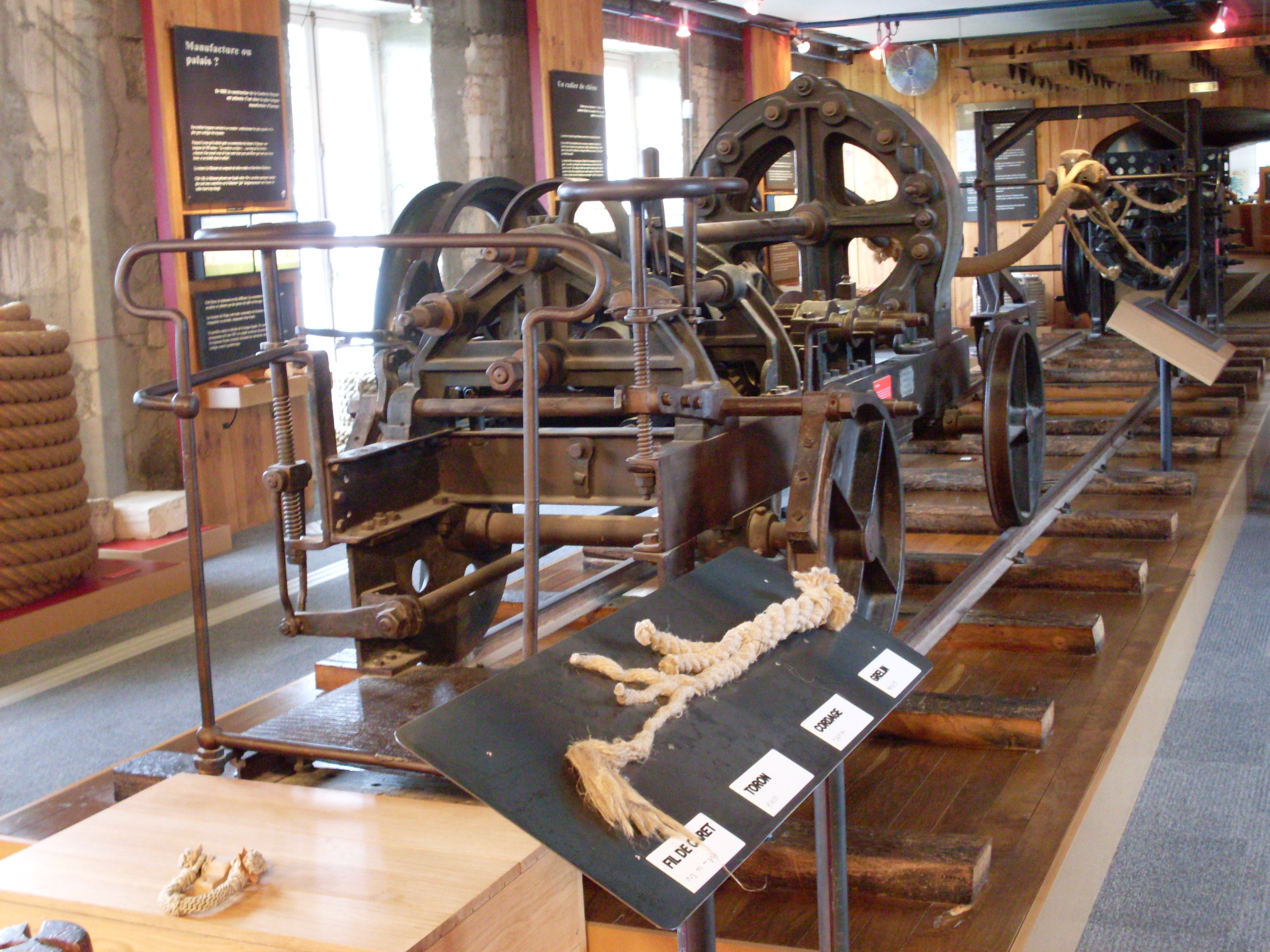
Cable machine

The International Sea Centre, sometimes referred to as the Rochefort International Sea Centre, is the museum of the Corderie Royale: it covers an exhibition area of 300 m^{2} occupying the northern wing of France's longest arsenal. It was opened to the public in 1986.

It includes a specialized library housing a wide range of books, documents and journals on the theme of the sea, open to the public as an annex to the Municipal Media Library, and a photo library and cinematheque of the sea with a multi-purpose projection room.

=== Permanent exhibition ===
A permanent exhibition room is devoted to the history of rope and rope making, while at the seamanship workshop, the demonstration of marine knots highlights the complexity of this technique. The impressively sized room is adapted to the different sizes of the ropes to be made: in this vast exhibition hall, tools and machines (including a cable machine from the 19th century), the raw materials used (including hemp), manufacturing processes and methods are presented with educational concern. Animated scenes of life aboard ships complete the visit. Temporary exhibitions on the maritime world are renewed on average every two years. The maritime bookstore offers 8,000 books related to the world of the sea. During the summer periods, guided tours are offered at the two museum sites of the Corderie Royale and the Hermione replica.

=== The redesign of the exhibition ===
In 2017, on the occasion of the 50 anniversary of the Royal Ropery as a historic Monument, the International Centre of the Sea undertook major works to renovate its permanent exhibition. On 1 April 2017, the exhibition reopened with a completely modified space. The experience is more interactive thanks to additions such as a holographic optical theater and manipulations left at the disposal of visitors. The seamanship area is preserved and the course is embellished with numerous videos and demonstrations to better explain the manufacturing process of the ropes used in the Navy.

The various workshops of the exhibition (spinning, laying, seamanship) show the process of ropemaking in the seventeenth century.
