= Cannabis in France =

Legality of cannabis in Europe Legal for recreational use Legal for medical use Illegal

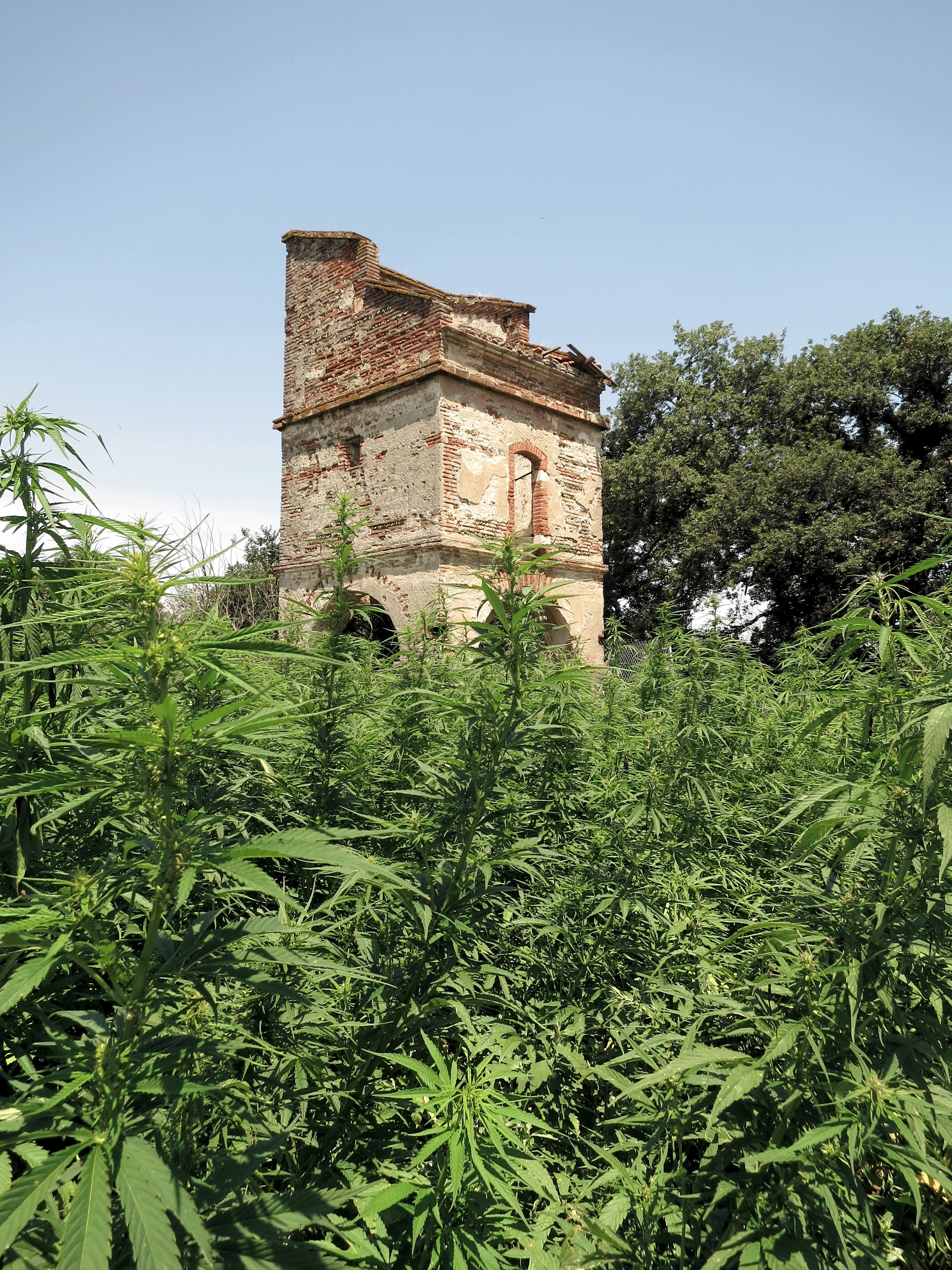
Hemp field in Portet-sur-Garonne, near Toulouse in Southern France

Cannabis in France is a plant considered indigenous, although currently illegal for personal use except in cases of varieties or products containing low amounts of the main active compound, ∆^{9}-THC. but remains one of the most popular illegal drugs. Limited types of cannabis-derived products are permitted for medical uses.

== History ==
=== Early history ===
Cannabis is cultivated in France since the late Neolithic. Documentation suggests that French hemp was not entirely deprived of ∆^{9}-THC. For example, in 1570, Mathias de l'Obel documented traditional uses of hemp in the Cévennes region, which included medicinal and psychoactive ones. He noted that hemp "promotes sleep; yet excessive use overwhelms with troublesome drowsiness." In the nineteenth century, a professor of medicine in Lyon explained:

The hemp seeds “chènevis” of our fibrous hemp (Cannabis sativa) do not seem totally deprived of inebriating properties; hempseed oil, which is part of the food regime of the poorest people, is said to sometimes produce a sort of excitation or hilarity which recalls that of haschich.

In early French pharmacopoeias, cannabis appeared used in different ways, from "emulsion" (similar to almond milk) to "sparadrap" (bandaid) and later on "haschish" and "tincture."

Hemp was, for long, extensively cultivated in France, with the primary output being the fibers used in the production of industrious and military materials (the national Corderie Royale remaining the best example). Nevertheless, French naturalist Jean-Baptiste Lamarck documented in 1780 that "Hemp plants grown in pots upon windowsills or cultivated in neighboring gardens". Today, France remains among the main producers of hemp for industrial (fiber) purposes, although only a limited number of varieties can be legally cultivated.

=== French Colonies ===
During Napoléon Bonaparte's invasion of Egypt in 1798, the troops got to try different preparations of hashish, which they found to their liking. As a result of the conspicuous consumption of hashish by the troops, the smoking of hashish and consumption of drinks containing it was banned in October 1800, although not by Napoleon but by Jacques-François Menou, one of his officers. Upon the end of the occupation in 1801, French troops reportedly brought supplies of hashish with them back to France. More than hashish, which historians have shown was a minor preoccupation for Napoleon, taking control of the vast fields of non-psychoactive hemp for fiber production of the Russian Empire was one of the main drivers of Napoleon's campaign in Russia.

More critically with regards to psychoactive hemp, the invasion of Algeria by France and its integration into the country as a department brought sustained and prolonged contact the French pharmaceutical industry with farmers, climates, and cultivation knowledge which were taken advantage of to create increase production capacity for France's internal market.

=== Recent history ===
A new interest in the plant and its effects, both medicinally and for non-medical purposes. In the mid-1800s, following travel and studies in Asia, French psychiatrist Jacques-Joseph Moreau studied hashish extensively and created the 1845 work of Du Hachisch et de l'aliénation mentale (Hashish and Mental Illness).

In the 1800s, hashish was embraced in some European literary circles. Most famously, the Club des Hashischins was a Parisian club dedicated to the consumption of hashish and other drugs; its members included authors Théophile Gautier, Moreau de Tours, Victor Hugo, Alexandre Dumas, Charles Baudelaire and Honoré de Balzac. Baudelaire later wrote the 1860 book Les paradis artificiels about the state of being under the influence of opium and hashish.

== Legality ==
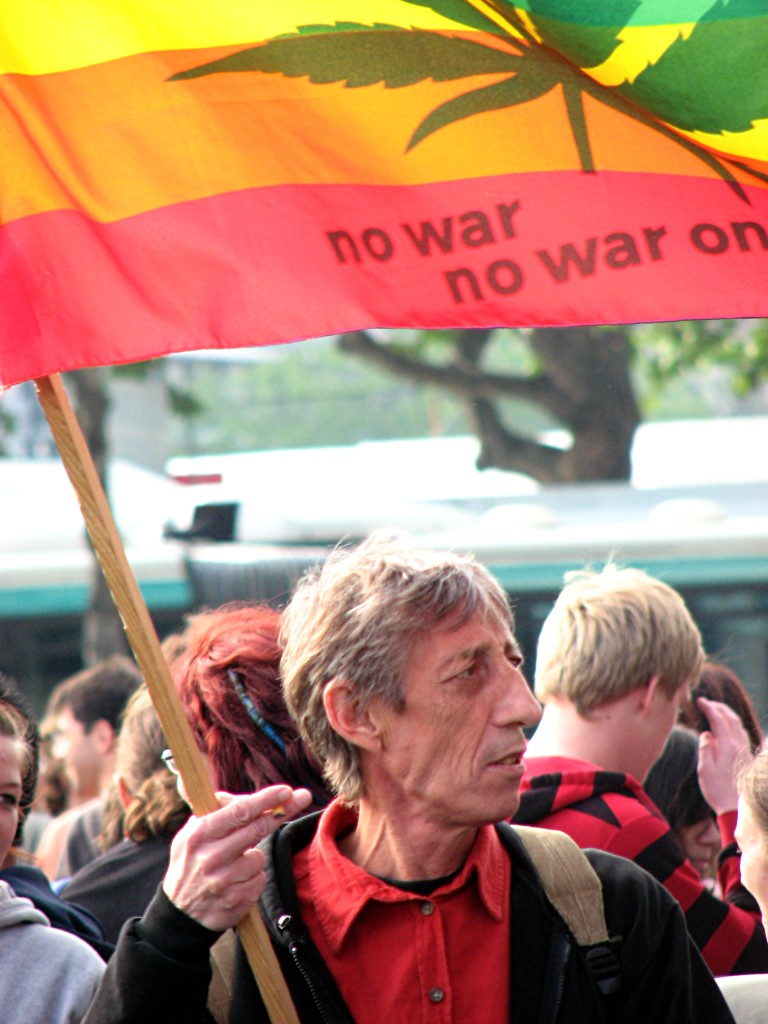
French cannabis legalisation activist Jean-Pierre Galland in 2007

In France, possession and use of cannabis fall under criminal law and the Loi du 31 décembre 1970, regarding health measures against drug abuse and suppression of drug trafficking.

=== Restrictions to freedom of speech ===
In French law, free speech is not permitted in relation to narcotic drugs, as Article L-3421-4 (formerly L 630) of the Public Health code states that:

Provocation to commit the offence provided for in Article L. 3421-1 or one of the offences provided for in Articles 222-34 to 222 3421-1 or one of the offences provided for in Articles 222-34 to 222-39 of the Criminal Code [i.e. any drug-related infraction], even if such provocation has not been followed up, or the fact of presenting these offences in a favorable light, shall be punishable by five years’ imprisonment and a fine of 75,000 euros

The vague and broad terms highlighted in the quote above have given rise to criticism and controversial legal action against cannabis activists, book editors, and online content creators.

=== Medical cannabis ===
France is a signatory to the 1961 Single Convention on narcotic drugs, and had banned cannabis as a medical treatment already in 1953. Since then, the importation, sale, transport and production of cannabis and cannabinoids has been illegal in France. In 1999, the Agence Française de Sécurité Sanitaire des Produits de Santé made temporary use authorisations for health products otherwise not permitted on the French market. In 1991 a court rejected the demands of the NGO Mouvement pour la Légalisation Contrôlée concerning the importation of cannabis to supply 10 patients suffering terminal illness, arguing that such was incompatible with France's adherence to the 1961 UN Single Convention on Narcotic Drugs, and MLC's inability to scientifically control and administer medical cannabis.

In June 2013, a reform intended to provide limited access, facilitating approval by the National Medical Safety Agency (Agence nationale de sécurité du médicament – ANSM). Pharmacists expected the change to facilitate research and access.

In September 2018, the French National Agency for Drug Safety (ANSM) started a limited experimentation on therapeutic cannabis. They created a scientific committee to evaluate a new public policy and distribution network for specific diseases. This experiment will gather 3,000 patients and provide dried flowers and extracts for people going under epilepsy, neuropathic pain or to treat side effects of chemotherapy. The first test started in 2021 (delayed due to the coronavirus pandemic) and has been going on since then, regularly prolonged.

=== Reform ===
On 25 May 2017, the Minister of the Interior indicated his intention to implement reforms, promised by President Emmanuel Macron during his campaign, to substitute citations rather than arrest and trial for use and possession of cannabis. On 23 November 2018 the penalty for possession of cannabis (and other illegal drugs) was reduced to a 200 euro fine, following a 28–14 vote by the National Assembly. On 1 September 2020, the French Government introduced a 200€ fine for cannabis consumption instead of being taken into custody. This measure will also be applied for cocaine detention. Macron has ruled out legalising cannabis while he is in office and legalisation is also opposed by the former government health minister Agnès Buzyn and Interior Minister Gérald Darmanin.

Those that support the legalisation of cannabis in France include Julien Bayou, Benoît Hamon, Yannick Jadot, Jean-Luc Mélenchon, Pierre Person and Aurélien Taché. In 2019, the French Conseil d'Analyse Économique published a report that recommended legalising cannabis for recreational use in France.

== Consumption ==
Trends in cannabis usage for ages 15–44 between 1990 and 2000

In 2012, 13.4 million French people between age 15 and 64 had tried cannabis, and 1.2 million people in Metropolitan France considered themselves regular users. France ranks fourth in the European Union in terms of monthly consumption (following the Czech Republic, Spain, and Italy) and second only to Denmark in terms of persons who have ever used cannabis.

In 2015, the European Monitoring Centre for Drugs and Drug Addiction published a new report on drugs, saying that the French people were still the biggest cannabis consumers, especially in the 15–34 segment. The report is also affirming that the product quality is increasing, due to competition and technical innovation.

== Opinion ==
A poll conducted by CSA in November 2013 indicated that, 55% of French people were opposed to the decriminalisation of cannabis, while 44% said that the prohibition on cannabis is an abridgment of individual liberty.

In June 2018, an IFOP poll for Terra Nova and Echo Citoyen found that 51% were in favour of a regulated market in cannabis, and 40% were opposed.

At the end of 2018, a poll by the French Observatory of Drugs and Addiction, a government body, found "nearly one in two" were favourable to legalisation with 54% opposed, while more than 9 in 10 were in favour of legalising medical cannabis.

An anonymous internet survey was carried out from 28 September 2021 to 29 March 2022 regarding the opinions of French psychiatrists on the regulatory status of cannabis. Of the 413 French psychiatrists who answered the survey, 253 (61.3%) stated support for the legalisation of recreational cannabis and 349 (84.4%) stated support for the legalisation of medical cannabis.

== See also ==
- Hemp in France
- NORML France
- FAAAT think & do tank
