= Hemp in France =

French plant used in textiles and nautical applications

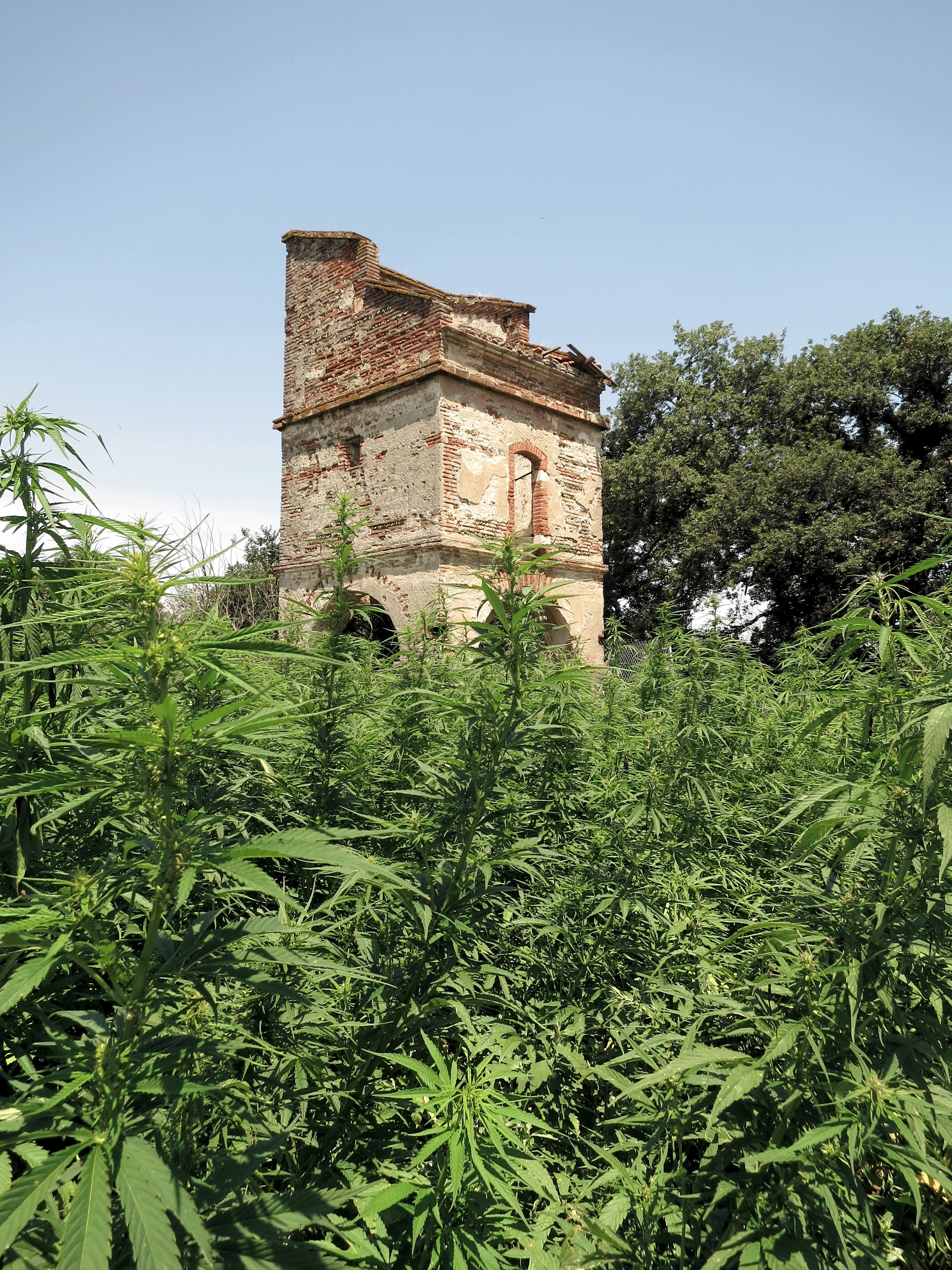
Hemp field at Toulouse

Hemp (French: chanvre) has been grown continuously in France for hundreds of years or longer for use as a textile, paper, animal bedding, and for nautical applications.

== History ==
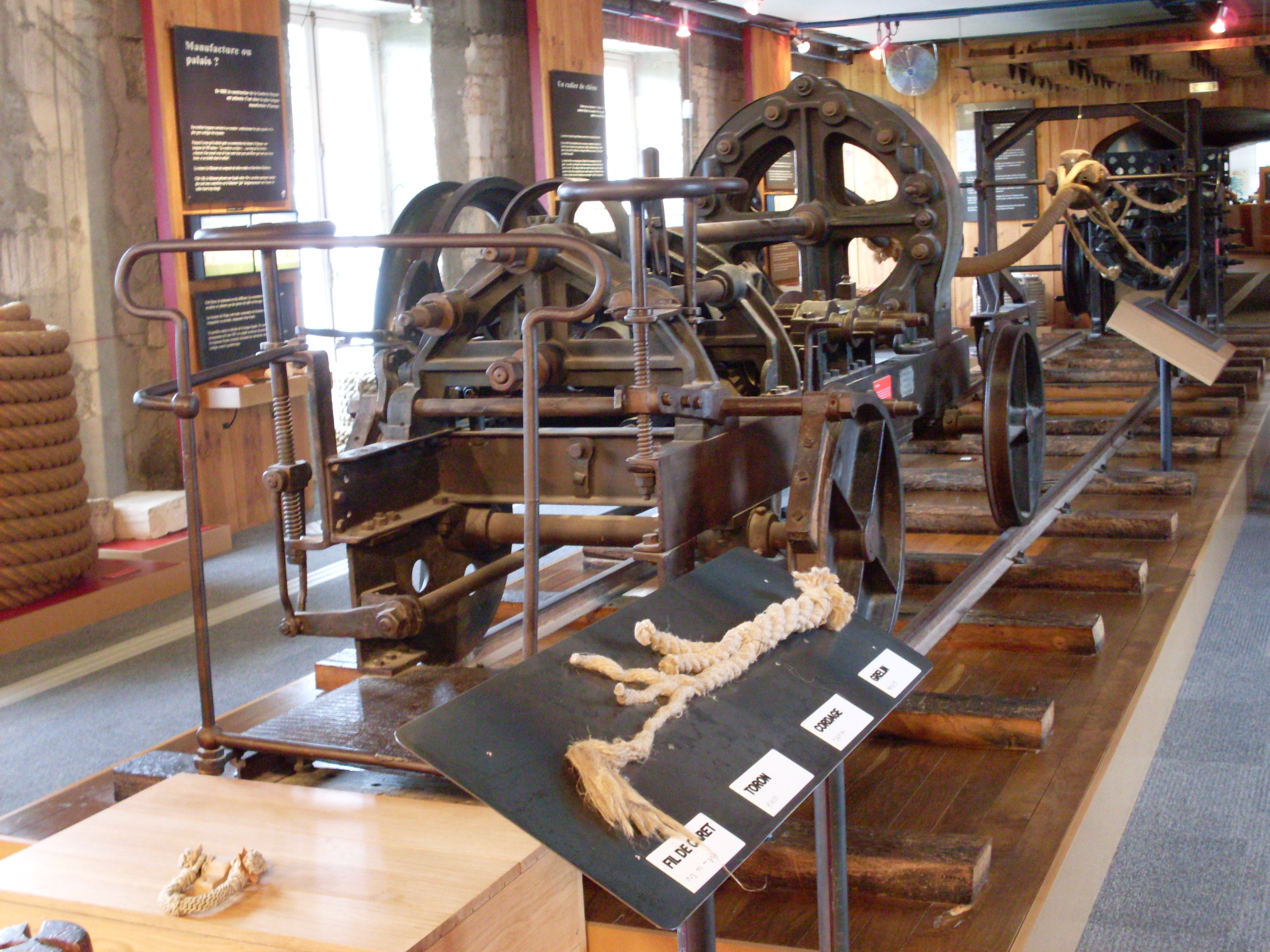
Hemp rope-making machine at Arsenal de Rochefort

There is archaeological evidence that Neolithic Europeans used hemp cloth in what is now Southern France 4,000 years BP. Hemp was introduced as a crop from Central and East Asia to Europe by the Scythians during the Bronze Age, and it was cultivated in France by 1000 CE and used for a number of purposes including canvas for sails and sacks, rope, and as a textile. William Shakespeare wrote of the quality of hemp cloth from Locronan in the tragedy Coriolanus. (Note: Act II, scene I refer to the fabric lockram, derived from Locronan) The Corderie Royale was built at Arsenal de Rochefort in 1666 for hemp rope needed by the Royal (French) Navy's rigging. In the 19th century, hemp production reached 200,000 hectares (490,000 acres). Breton hemp (from Brittany) was considered some of the finest in the world. The French Navy "always" used national hemp sources for oakum necessary to seal wooden boats and ships.

=== Decline ===
Production declined and nearly went extinct (Note: 700 hectares planted in 1960 was France's minimum recorded crop) with the introduction of other fibers, especially cotton, until its reintroduction in the 1960s. France is the only Western European country that never prohibited hemp cultivation in the 20th century.

== Modern hemp ==
France produced more than half of the hemp in Europe most years between 1993 and 2015. (Note: According to European Industrial Hemp Association, only Spain produced more than France, in 1998) Most modern hemp seed cultivars originate from France and a handful of other European countries, or China. Hemp fiber from France is used to make hemp paper and the hurds are used to make bedding for horses and other domesticated animals. (Note: Horse bedding consumed 45% of the hurds in 2010 and 2013) As of 1994, most of the crop was used to make high quality paper for Bibles, currency and rolling paper.

Coopérative Centrale Des Producteurs De Semences De Chanvre is the main supplier of hempseed in the European Union.

== See also ==
- Cannabis in France
