= Rochefort, Charente-Maritime =

Rochefort
- Subprefecture and commune
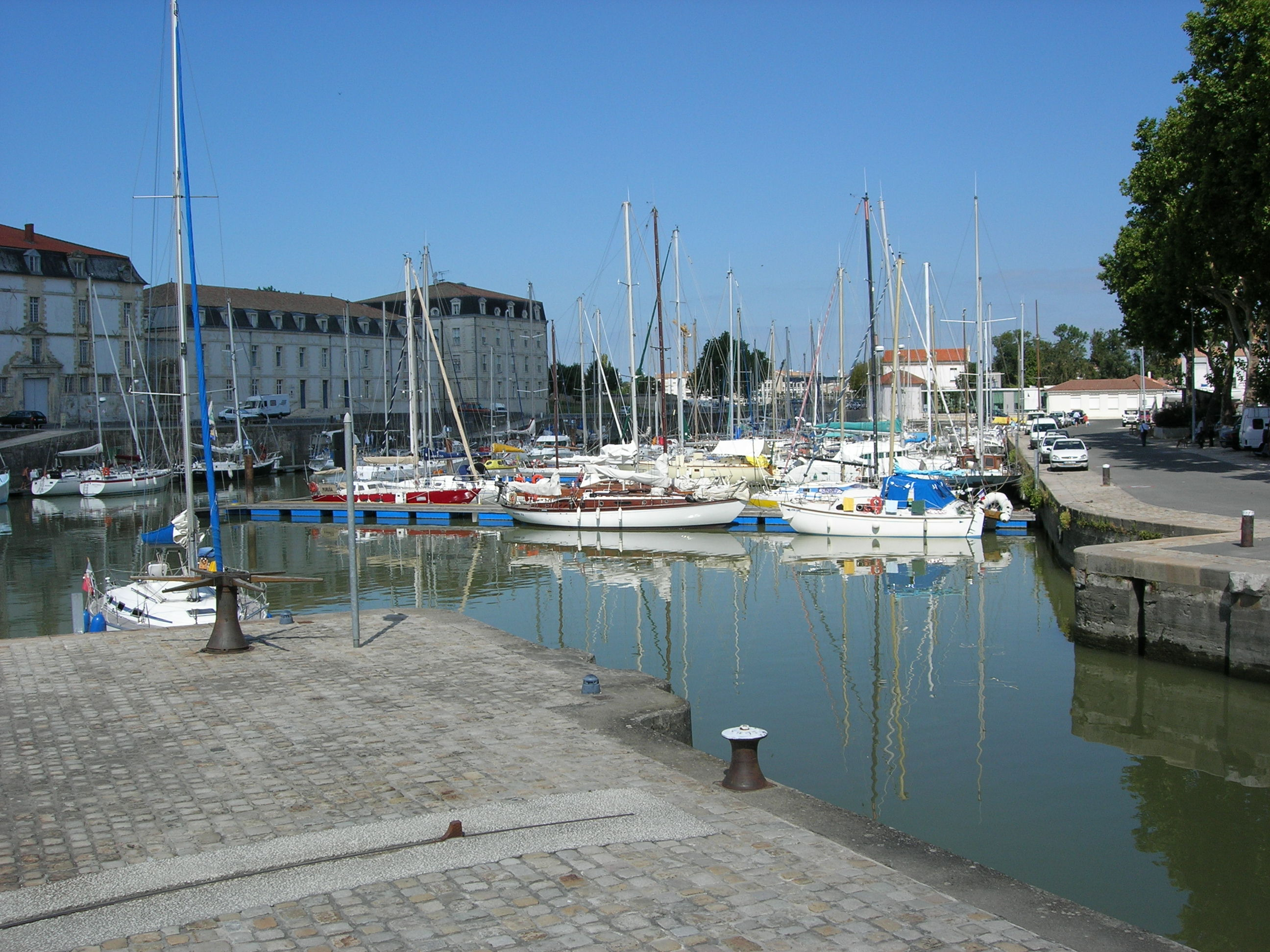
- Port in Rochefort

- Flag Coat of arms
- Location of Rochefort
- Location within France Location within Nouvelle-Aquitaine
- Coordinates: 45°56′32″N 0°57′32″W
- Country: France
- Region: Nouvelle-Aquitaine
- Department: Charente-Maritime
- Arrondissement: Rochefort
- Canton: Rochefort
- Intercommunality: CA Rochefort Océan

Government
  - Mayor (2020–2026): Hervé Blanché
- Area^{1}: 21.95 km^{2} (8.47 sq mi)
- Elevation: 5 m (16 ft)
- Highest elevation: 29 m (95 ft)
- Lowest elevation: 0 m (0 ft)
- Population (2023): 23,460
  - Density: 1,069/km^{2} (2,768/sq mi)
- Demonym(s): Rochefortian (English); Rochefortais, Rochefortaise (French)
- Time zone: UTC+01:00 (CET)
  - Summer (DST): UTC+02:00 (CEST)
- INSEE/Postal code: 17299 /17300
- ^{1} French Land Register data, which excludes lakes, ponds, glaciers > 1 km^{2} (0.386 sq mi or 247 acres) and river estuaries.

Rochefort (French pronunciation: [ʁɔʃfɔʁ]; Occitan: Ròchafòrt; Poitevin-Saintongese: Rochefort or Rochfort), also known as Rochefort-sur-Mer (French pronunciation: [ʁɔʃfɔʁ syʁ mɛʁ]; Occitan: Ròchafòrt de Mar) for disambiguation, is a city and commune in Southwestern France, a port on the Charente estuary. It is a subprefecture of the department of Charente-Maritime, located in the administrative region of Nouvelle-Aquitaine (before 2015: Poitou-Charentes).

== Geography ==
Rochefort lies on the river Charente, close to its outflow into the Atlantic Ocean. It is about 30 km southeast of La Rochelle. Rochefort station has rail connections to La Rochelle, Nantes and Bordeaux.

== History ==
Rochefort sur Mer Labour Exchange, early 20th century

In December 1665, Rochefort was chosen by Jean-Baptiste Colbert as a place of "refuge, defence and supply" for the French Navy. The Arsenal de Rochefort served as a naval base and dockyard until it closed in 1926.

In September 1757, Rochefort was the target of an ambitious British raid during the Seven Years' War.

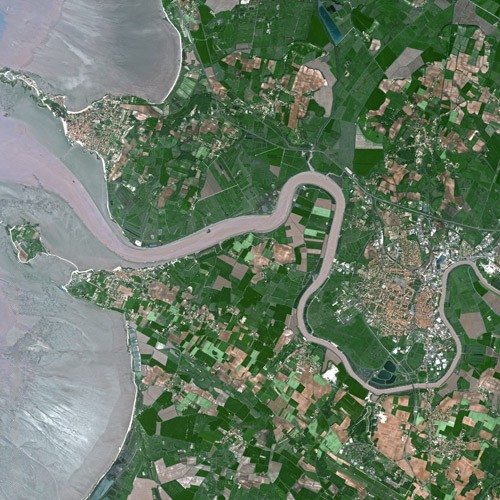
Rochefort (centre-right) seen from Spot Satellite

Another infrastructure of early Rochefort from 1766 was its bagne, a high-security penal colony involving hard labour. Bagnes were then common fixtures in military harbors and naval bases, such as Toulon or Brest, because they provided free labor. During the Jacobin period of the French Revolution (1790–95), over 800 Roman Catholic priests and other clergy who refused to take the anti-Papal oath of the "Civil Constitution of the Clergy" were put aboard a fleet of prison ships in Rochefort harbour, where most died due to inhumane conditions.

Off Rochefort, from the island of Île-d'Aix where he had spent several days hoping to flee to America, Napoleon Bonaparte surrendered to Captain F. L. Maitland aboard HMS Bellerophon, on 17 July 1815, ending the "Hundred Days".

Rochefort is a notable example of 17th-century "ville nouvelle" or new town, which means its design and building resulted from a political decree. The reason for building Rochefort was to a large extent that royal power could hardly depend on rebellious Protestant La Rochelle, which Cardinal Richelieu had to besiege a few decades earlier. Well into the 20th century, Rochefort remained primarily a garrison town. The tourist industry, which had long existed due to the town's spa, gained emphasis in the 1990s.

== Population ==
Historical population

Year	Pop.	±% p.a.
1793	20,874	—
1800	15,000	−4.61%
1806	14,615	−0.43%
1821	12,389	−1.10%
1831	14,040	+1.26%
1836	15,441	+1.92%
1841	20,077	+5.39%
1846	21,738	+1.60%
1851	24,330	+2.28%
1856	28,998	+3.57%
1861	30,212	+0.82%
1866	30,151	−0.04%
1872	28,299	−1.05%
1876	27,012	−1.16%
1881	27,854	+0.62%
1886	31,256	+2.33%
1891	33,334	+1.30%
1896	34,392	+0.63%
1901	36,458	+1.17%

Year	Pop.	±% p.a.
1906	36,694	+0.13%
1911	35,019	−0.93%
1921	29,473	−1.71%
1926	28,275	−0.83%
1931	26,452	−1.32%
1936	29,482	+2.19%
1946	29,472	−0.00%
1954	30,858	+0.58%
1962	28,648	−0.92%
1968	29,226	+0.33%
1975	28,155	−0.53%
1982	26,167	−1.04%
1990	25,561	−0.29%
1999	25,797	+0.10%
2007	25,999	+0.10%
2012	24,698	−1.02%
2017	24,151	−0.45%
2023	23,460	−0.48%

Source: EHESS and INSEE (1968–2023)

== Sights ==
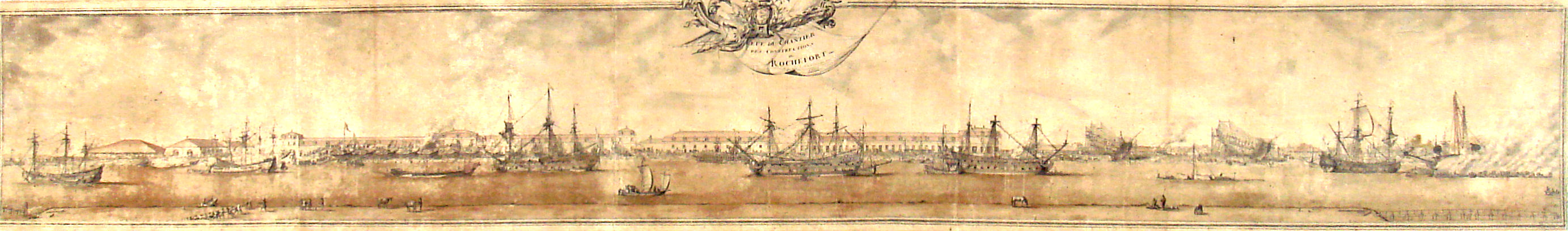
Rochefort arsenal, in 1690

Map of Rochefort (around 1750)

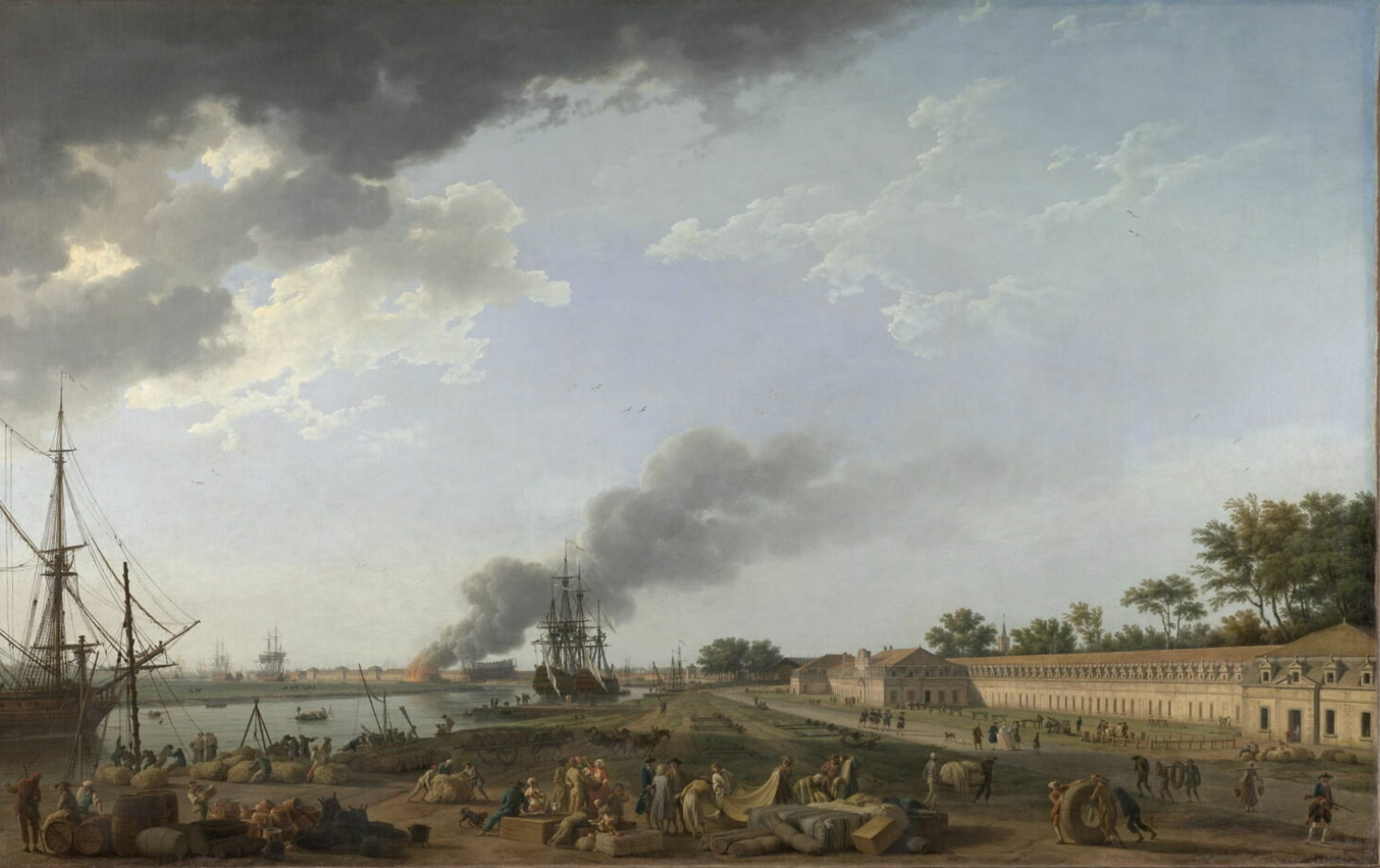
View of Rochefort Harbour from the Magasin des Colonies by Joseph Vernet, 1762

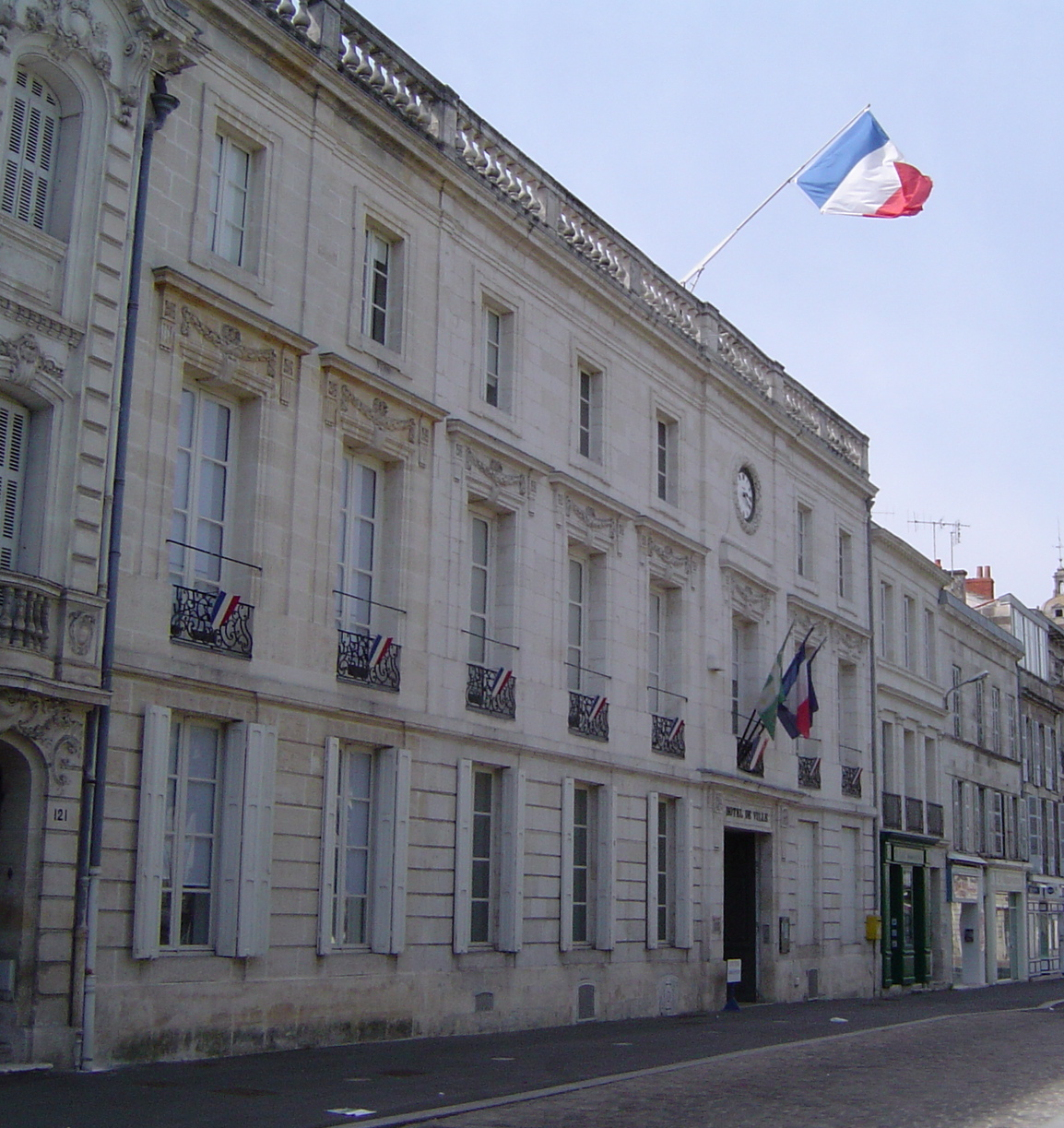
The Hôtel de Ville

Noteworthy buildings of the original naval establishment include:

- a hospital, incorporating a School of Naval Medicine (now a museum)
- the Arsenal with a monumental gateway and the National Navy Museum (Musée National de la Marine)
- the Rope Factory (corderie), at over 370 metres long for centuries the longest manufacturing building in the world
- three dry docks (radoubs) for shipbuilding and repair
- a cannon foundry (not open to the public)

Other sights include:

- a rare transporter bridge (pont transbordeur), consisting of a high level bridge containing a transport mechanism from which a ferry platform is suspended. This bridge, the Rochefort-Martrou Transporter Bridge, built in 1900, is the only remaining one in France and one of only eight still in service world-wide
- the municipal theatre (la Coupe d'Or)
- the railway station
- Saint-Louis church
- Pierre Loti's house (closed indefinitely pending completion of renovation work)
- Museums of Naval Aeronautics, old-time trades (Commerces d'Autrefois), and local archaeology (la Vieille Paroisse)
- Conservatoire du Bégonia, the world's largest begonia collection
- L'Hermione, a replica of a 1779 frigate completed in the town in 2014
- Place Colbert, main square famously known as the set of the 1967 musical film The Young Girls of Rochefort
- The Hôtel de Ville, on Place Colbert, completed in around 1770

== Notable inhabitants ==
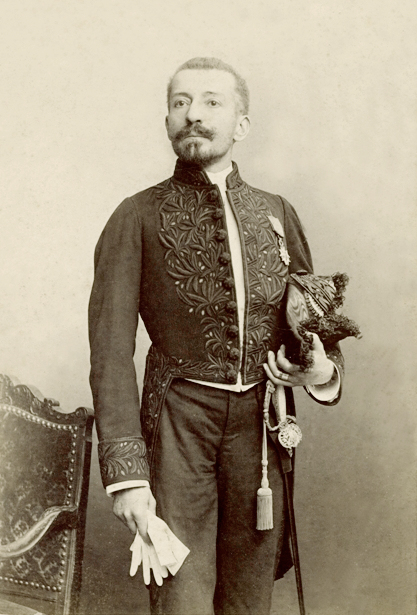
Pierre Loti, 1892

Rochefort was the birthplace of:

- Louis-René Levassor de Latouche Tréville (1745–1804), French admiral.
- Jean Baptiste Audebert (1759–1800), French artist and naturalist.
- Charles Rigault de Genouilly (1807–1873), French admiral, conqueror of Vietnam.
- Pierre Adolphe Lesson (1805–1888), botanist, born and died in Rochefort
- René Primevère Lesson (1794–1849), surgeon, naturalist, ornithologist, and herpetologist, born and died in Rochefort
- Pierre Loti (1850–1923), a French naval officer and novelist. His house is now a museum.
- Amédée William Merlaud-Ponty (1866–1915), Governor General of French West Africa.
- Pauline Réage (1907–1998), pseudonym of Anne Desclos, author
- Maurice Merleau-Ponty (1908–1961), philosopher
- Pierre Salviac, (born 1946), a French journalist, former rugby-match commentator and since then polemicist.

== International relations ==
Rochefort is twinned with:

- Torrelavega, Cantabria, Spain
- Papenburg, Lower Saxony, Germany

== Climate ==
Climate data for Rochefort (Saint-Agnant) (1992–2020 normals, extremes 1992–present)
Month	Jan	Feb	Mar	Apr	May	Jun	Jul	Aug	Sep	Oct	Nov	Dec	Year
Record high °C (°F)	17.0 (62.6)	23.0 (73.4)	26.2 (79.2)	30.3 (86.5)	33.2 (91.8)	40.6 (105.1)	41.4 (106.5)	40.1 (104.2)	35.5 (95.9)	31.3 (88.3)	23.0 (73.4)	19.7 (67.5)	41.4 (106.5)
Mean daily maximum °C (°F)	9.9 (49.8)	11.0 (51.8)	14.0 (57.2)	16.7 (62.1)	20.2 (68.4)	23.6 (74.5)	25.5 (77.9)	25.6 (78.1)	23.1 (73.6)	18.7 (65.7)	13.5 (56.3)	10.4 (50.7)	17.7 (63.9)
Daily mean °C (°F)	6.9 (44.4)	7.4 (45.3)	9.7 (49.5)	12.1 (53.8)	15.6 (60.1)	18.8 (65.8)	20.6 (69.1)	20.6 (69.1)	17.9 (64.2)	14.6 (58.3)	10.1 (50.2)	7.4 (45.3)	13.5 (56.3)
Mean daily minimum °C (°F)	4.0 (39.2)	3.7 (38.7)	5.4 (41.7)	7.4 (45.3)	10.9 (51.6)	14.1 (57.4)	15.7 (60.3)	15.5 (59.9)	12.8 (55.0)	10.5 (50.9)	6.8 (44.2)	4.3 (39.7)	9.3 (48.7)
Record low °C (°F)	−8.8 (16.2)	−8.4 (16.9)	−8.7 (16.3)	−2.5 (27.5)	2.0 (35.6)	6.0 (42.8)	9.3 (48.7)	8.6 (47.5)	4.7 (40.5)	−1.9 (28.6)	−5.8 (21.6)	−9.2 (15.4)	−9.2 (15.4)
Average precipitation mm (inches)	77.3 (3.04)	56.7 (2.23)	57.7 (2.27)	65.1 (2.56)	57.6 (2.27)	46.6 (1.83)	37.1 (1.46)	44.4 (1.75)	61.5 (2.42)	82.8 (3.26)	98.0 (3.86)	93.4 (3.68)	778.2 (30.64)
Average precipitation days (≥ 1.0 mm)	12.0	10.1	10.0	10.2	9.3	6.9	6.2	6.8	8.0	11.3	12.7	13.7	117.1
Source: Meteociel

== See also ==
- Communes of the Charente-Maritime department
- Kaolin deposits of the Charentes Basin
- The Young Girls of Rochefort film directed by Jacques Demy with Catherine Deneuve, Françoise Dorléac, and Gene Kelly with music composed by Michel Legrand
