= Rochefort Arsenal =

French naval base and dockyard

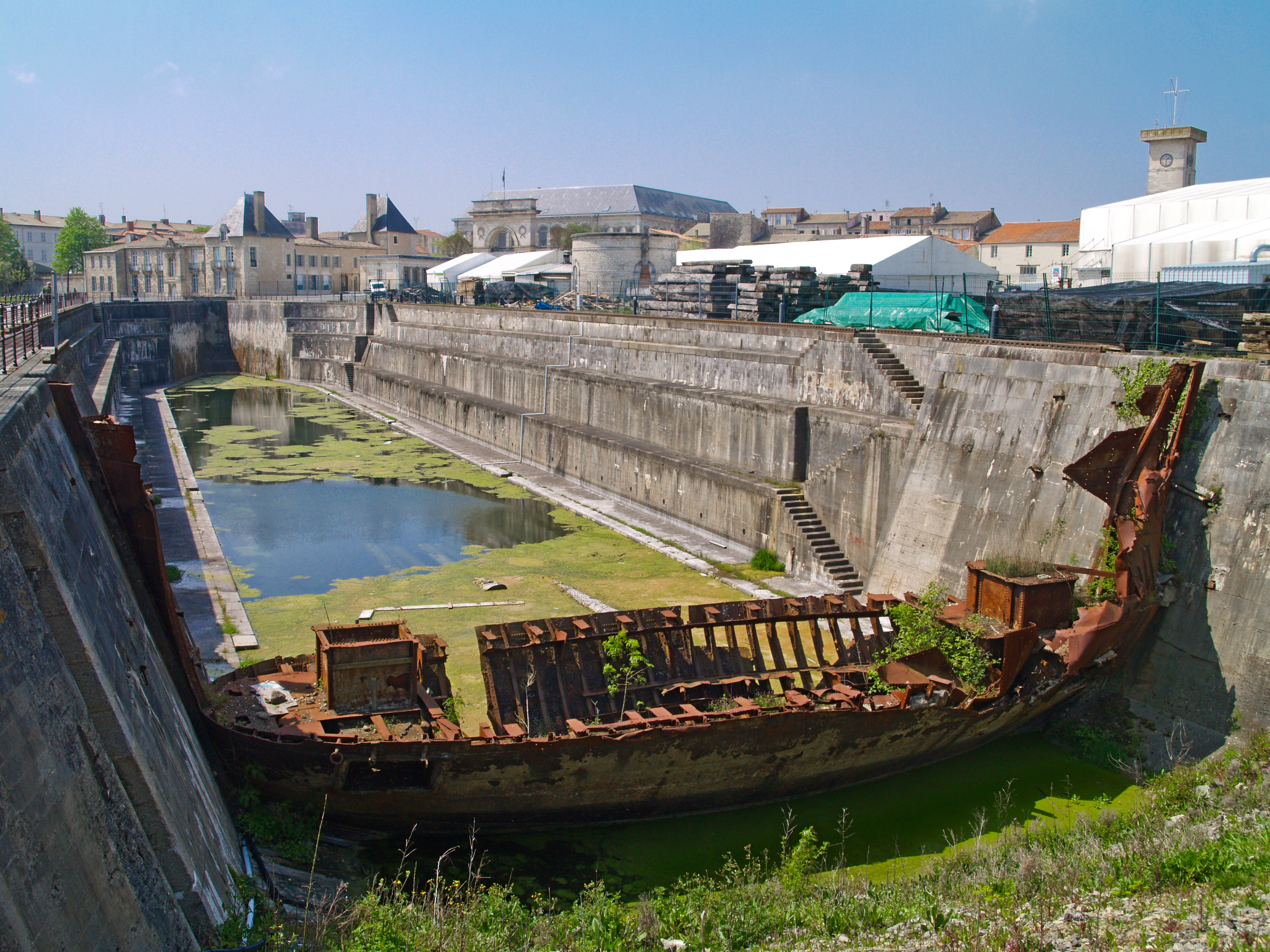
- Interactive map of Rochefort Arsenal
- Location in France

Location
- Location: France
- Coordinates: 45°56′06″N 0°57′28″W

The Arsenal de Rochefort was a French naval base and dockyard in the town of Rochefort. It was founded in 1665 and it was closed in 1926.

In December 1665 Rochefort was chosen by Jean-Baptiste Colbert as a place of "refuge, defense and supply" for the French Navy. Its military harbour was fortified by Louis XIV's Commissary of Fortifications Sébastien Le Prestre de Vauban. Between 1666 and 1669 the King had the Corderie Royale (then the longest building in Europe) constructed to make cordage for French ships of war. The making of cordage ceased in 1867 and in 1926 the Arsenal de Rochefort was closed.

== Gallery ==
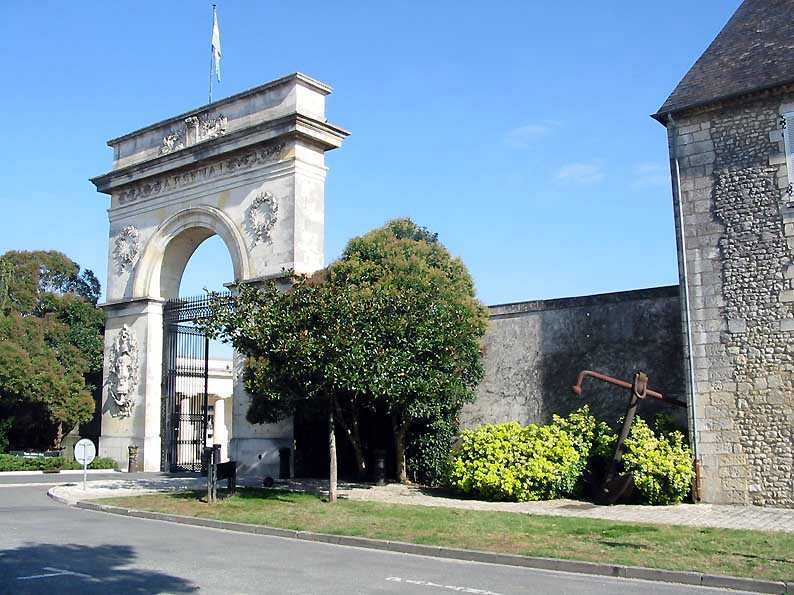

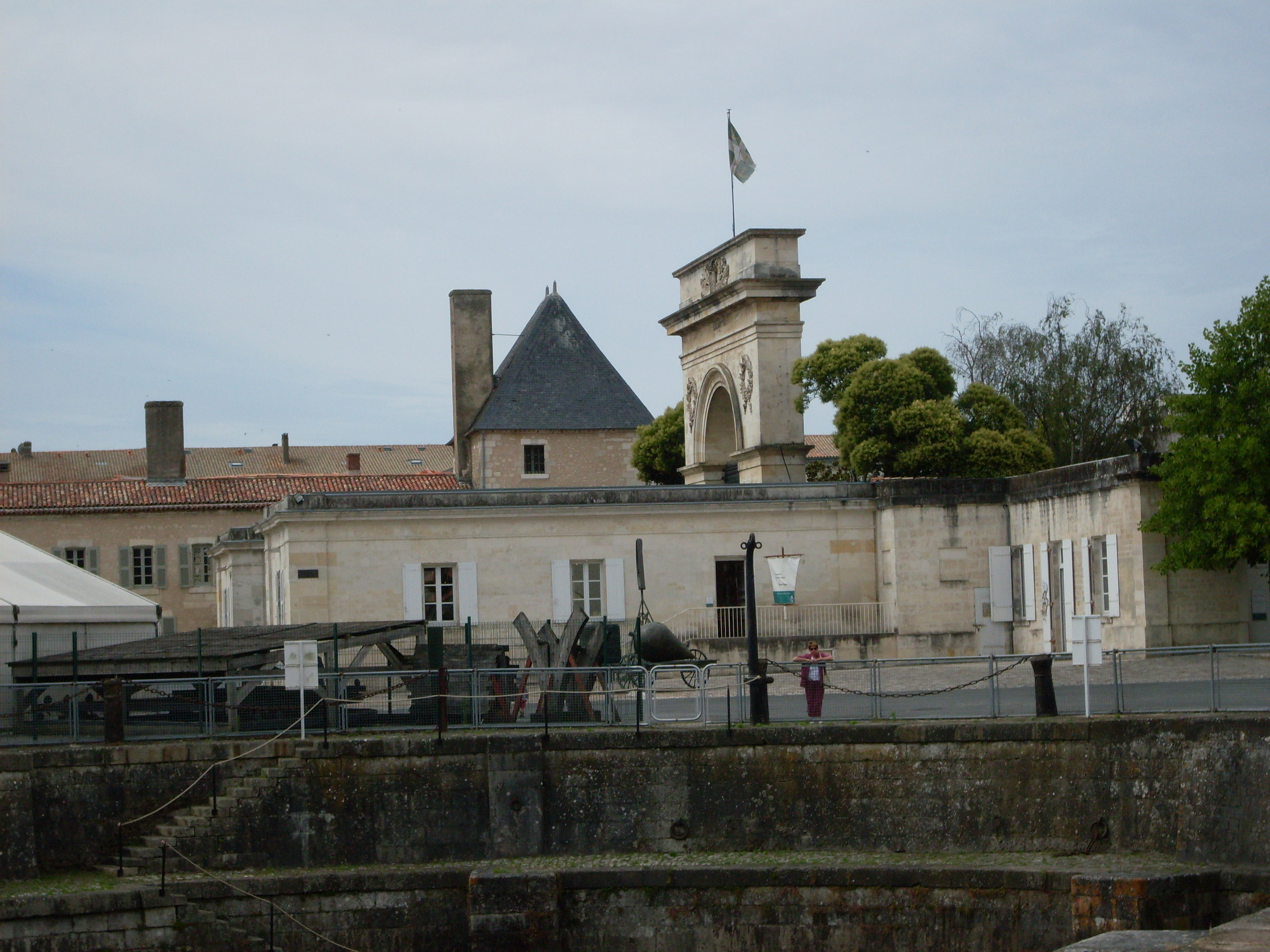

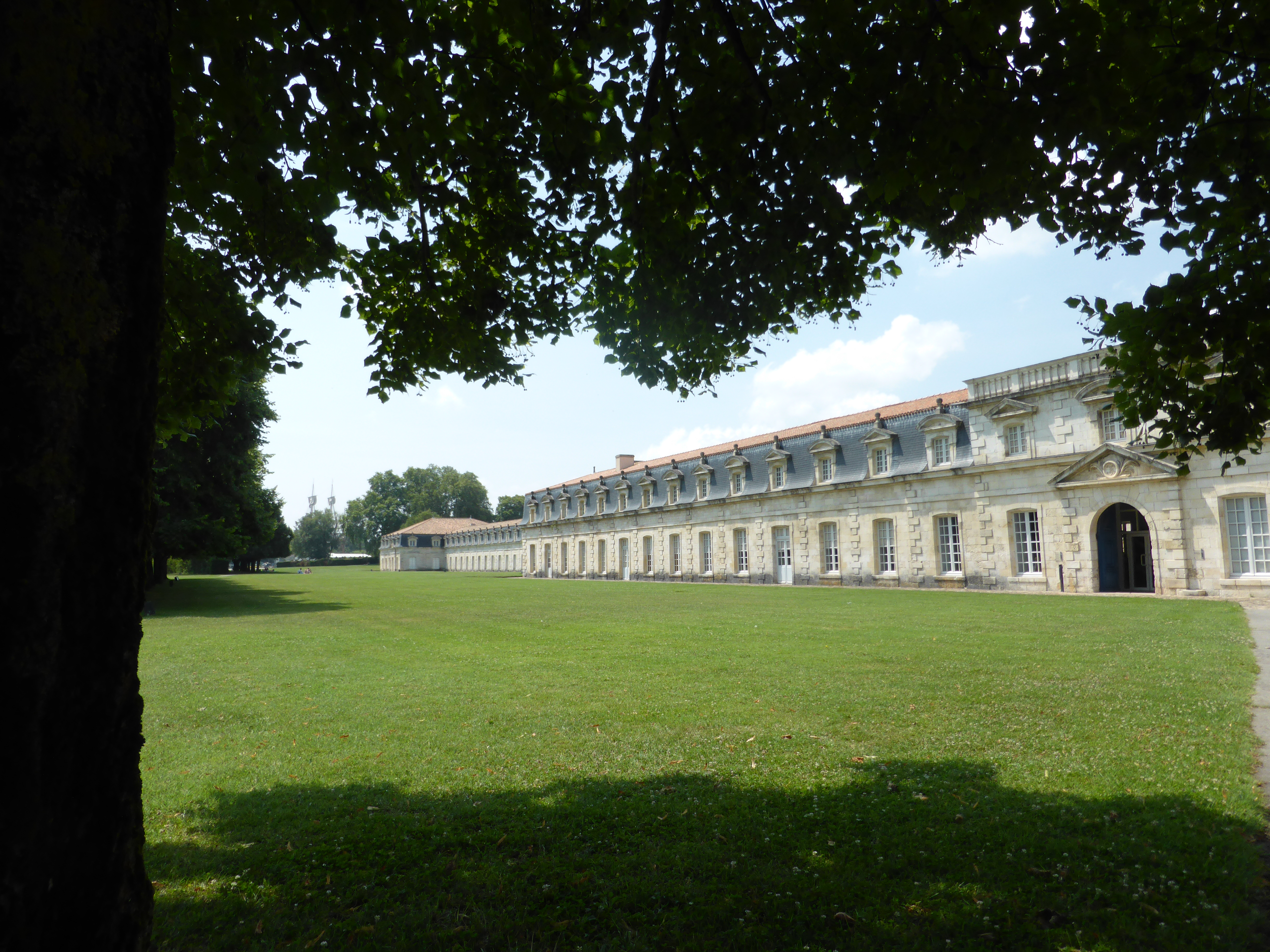

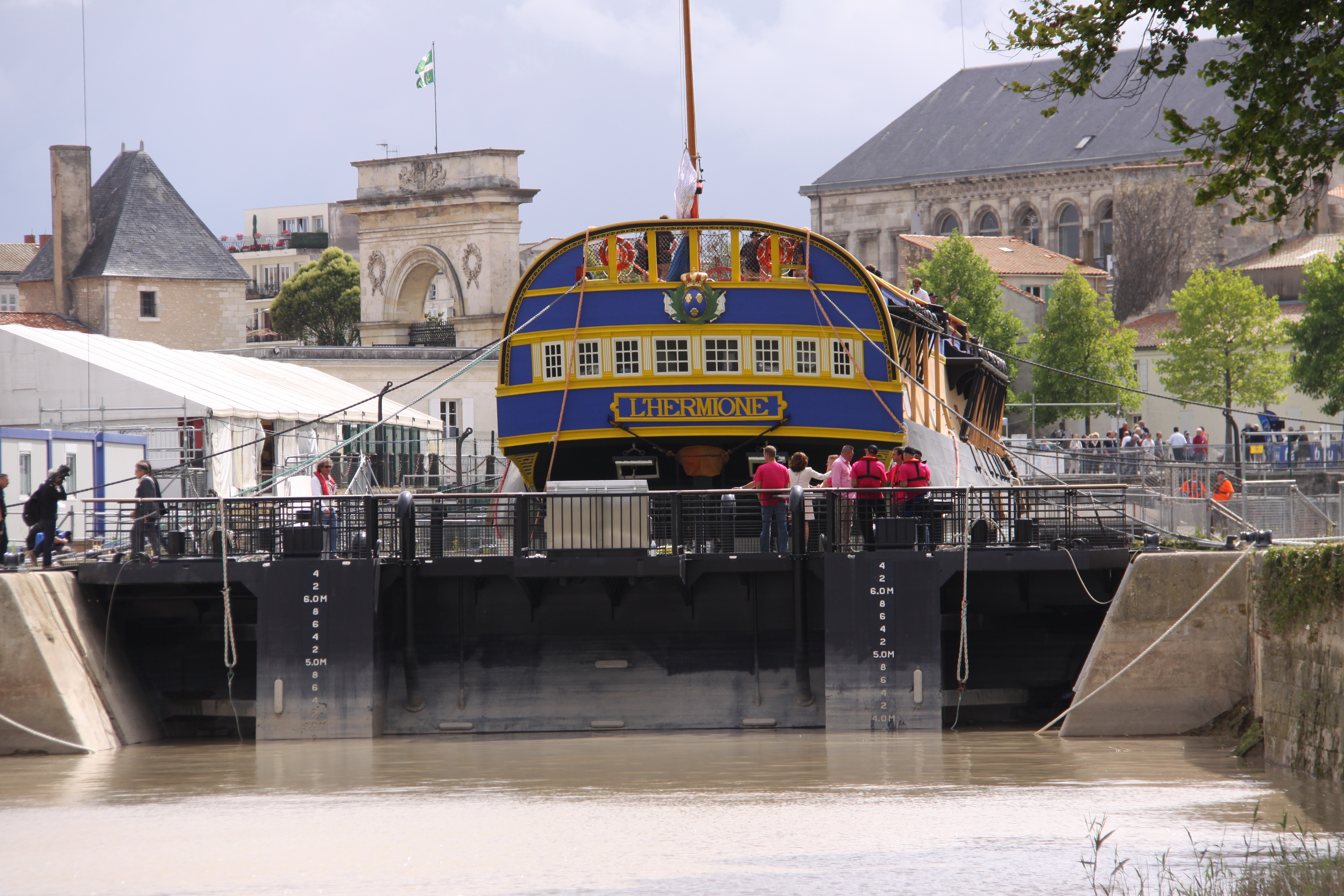

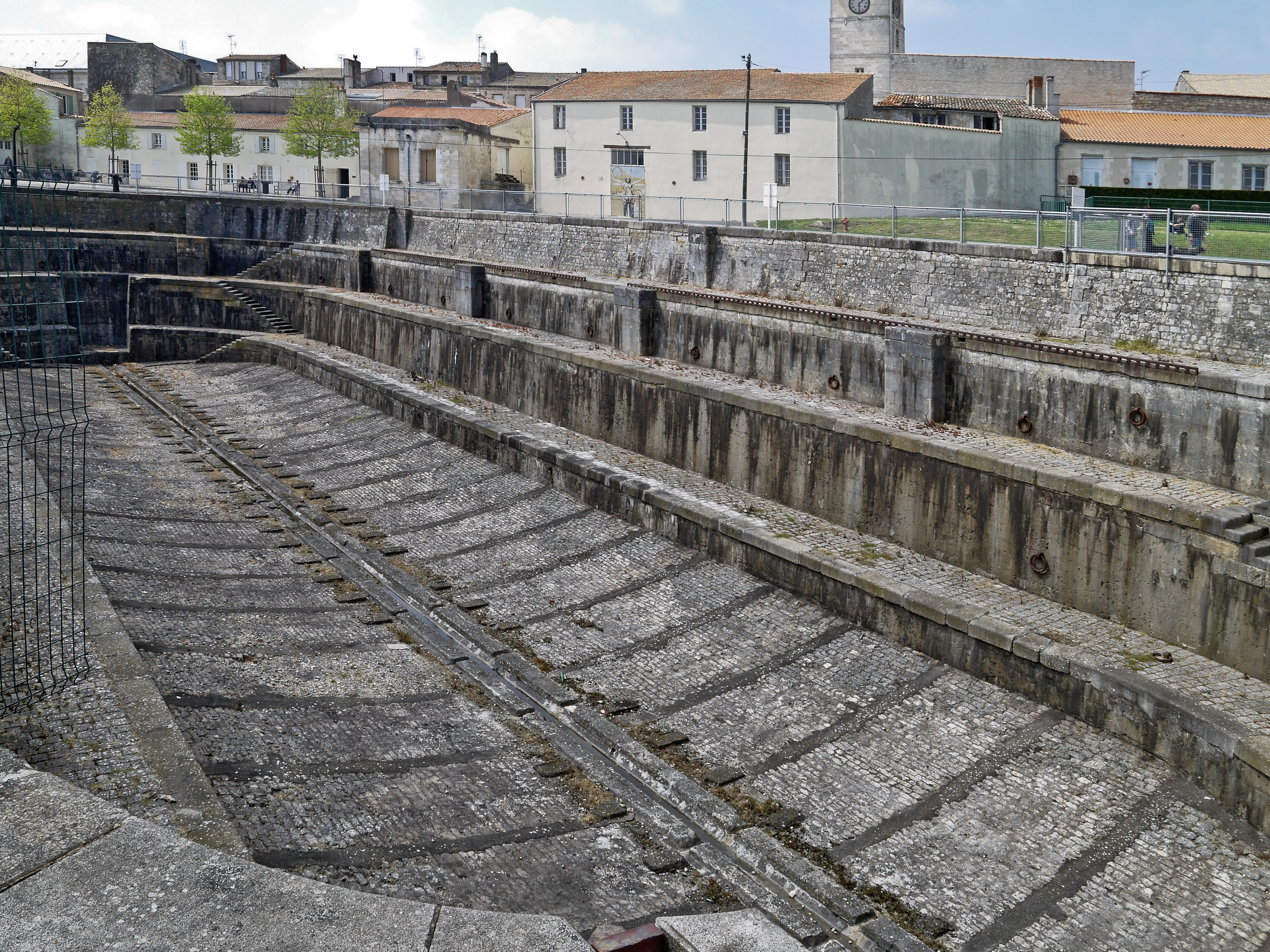

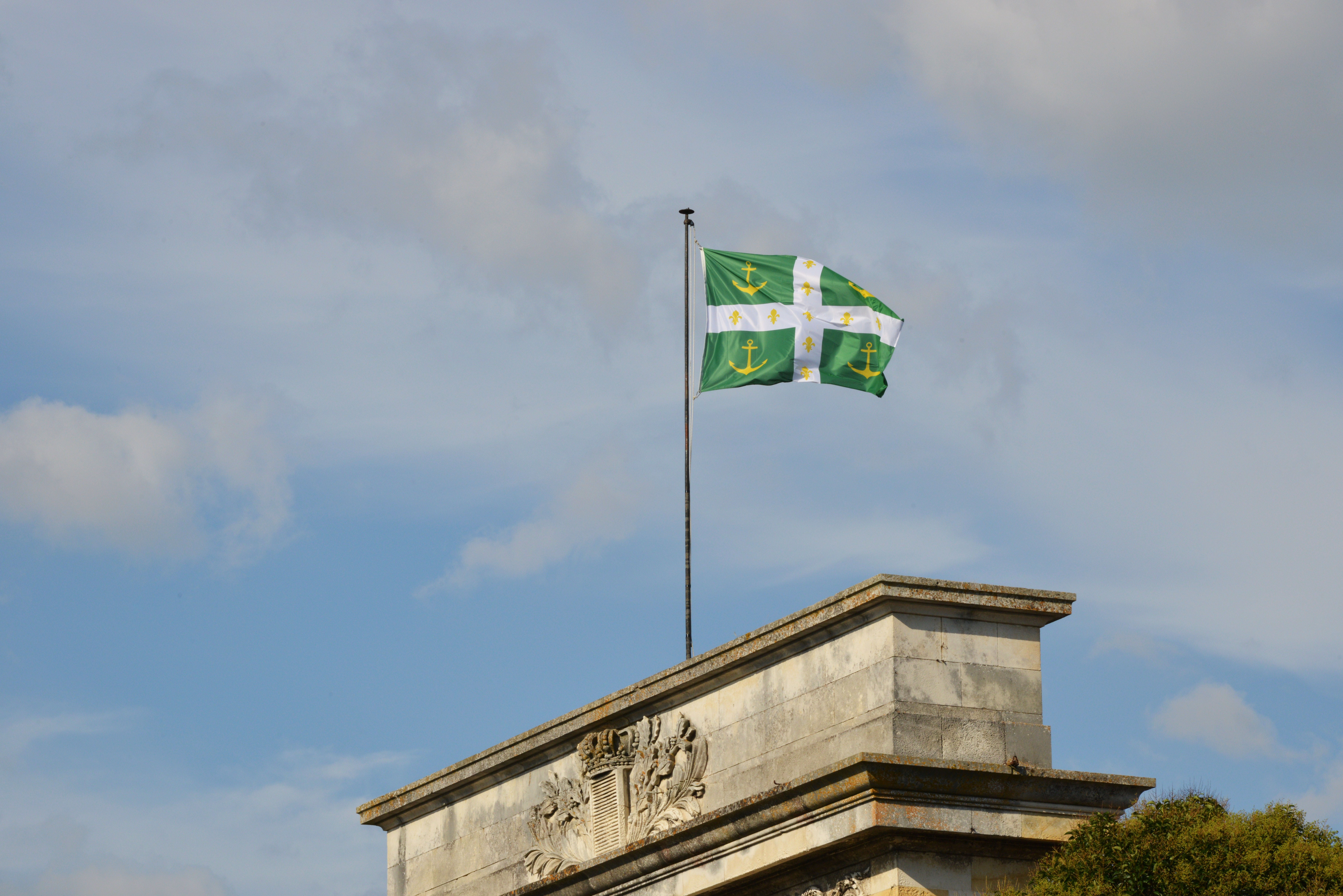

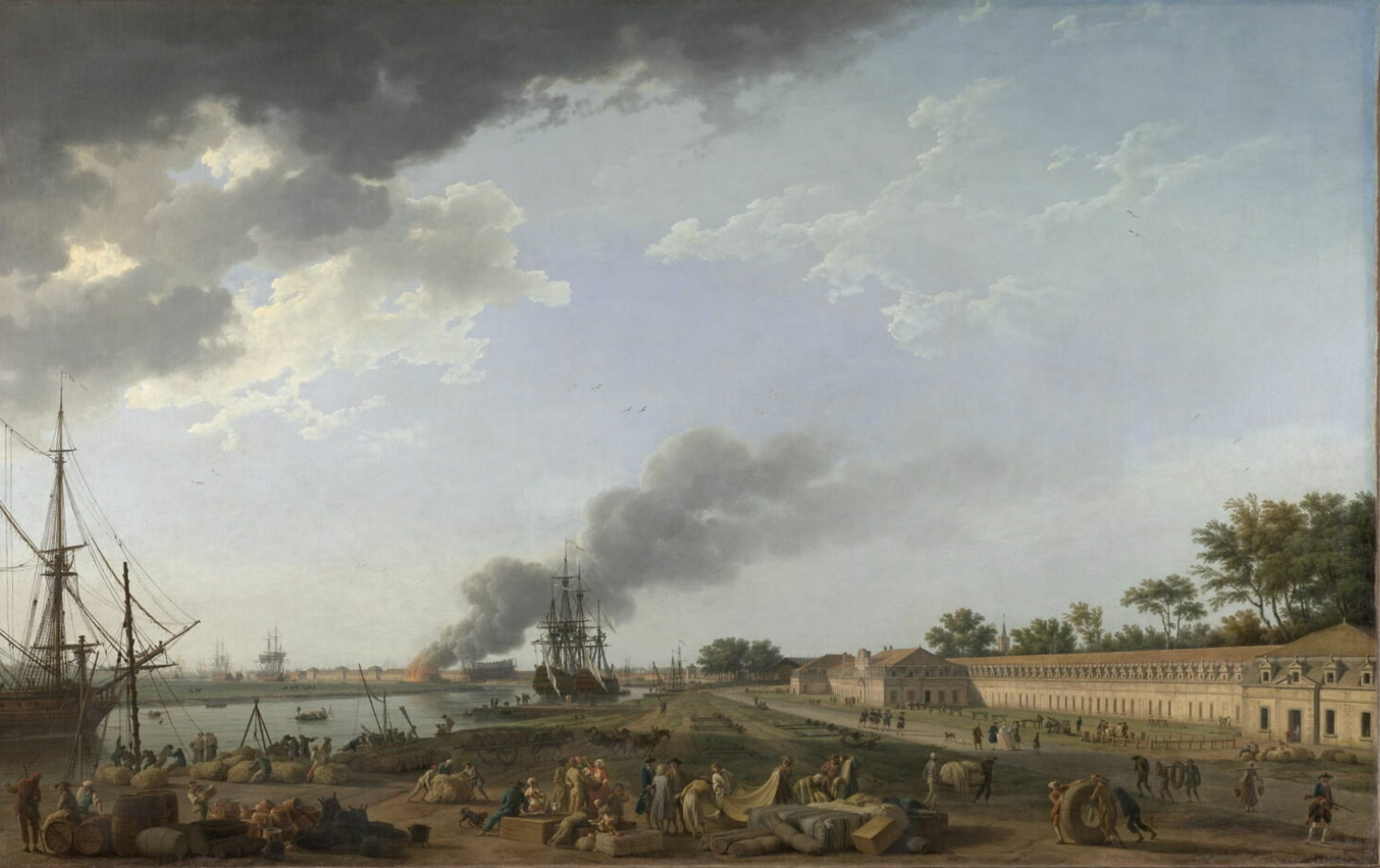
View of Rochefort Harbour from the Magasin des Colonies by Joseph Vernet, 1762

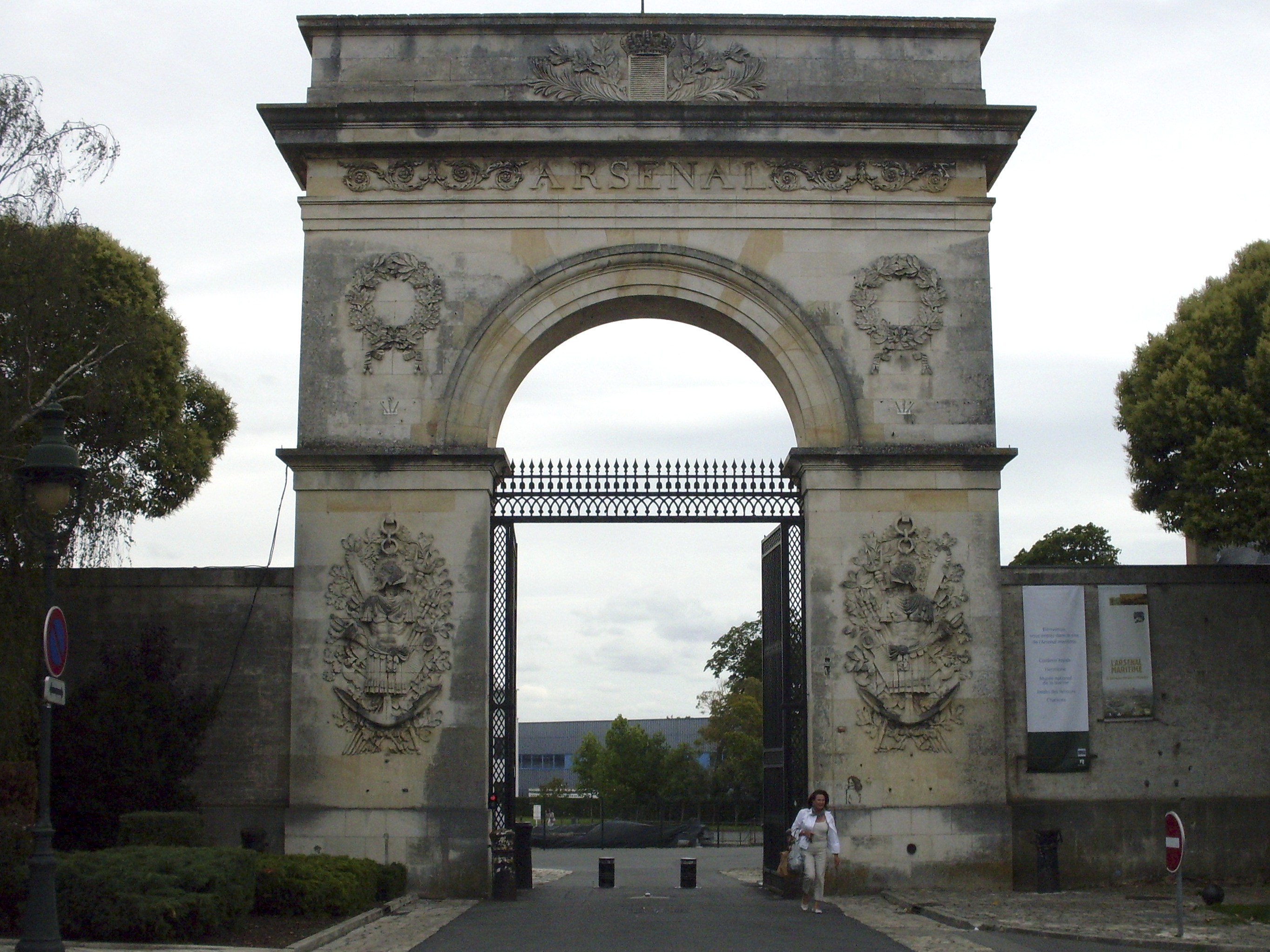

== See also ==
- Raid on Rochefort, a 1757 British raid on Rochefort during the Seven Years' War.
