= Cannabis in Spain =

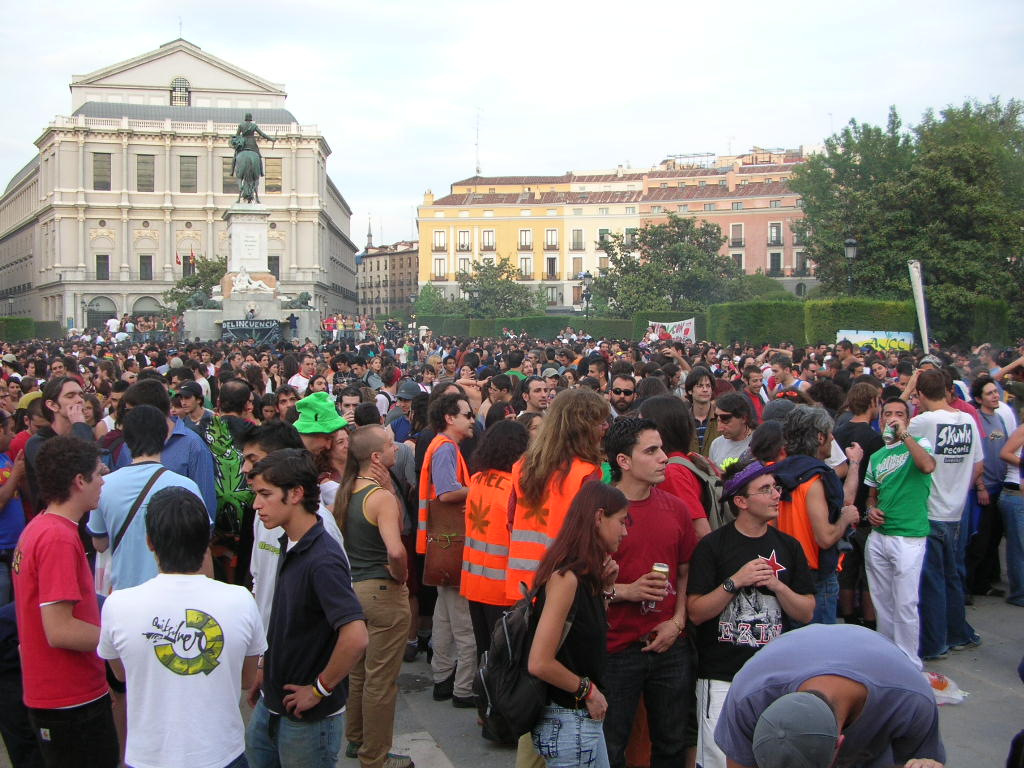
Million Marijuana March, 2005 in Madrid

Cannabis and hemp in Spain have a long and rich history. The plant has grown feral on the Iberian peninsula since prehistory and has been intensely cultivated, in particular for its fibres, throughout Spanish and Portuguese history.

== History of cannabis and hemp in Spain ==
The Cannabis plant genus has been documented to be present on the Iberian peninsula before humans arrived. As early as the late Neolithic, the plant was growing feral, as in most parts of the Mediterranean coasts. It became intensely cultivated in Spain, in particular for its fibre production.

=== Cannabis in ancient times ===
During Antiquity, cannabis was cultivated and discussed on the basis of texts from Ancient medical authors like Galen, Dioscorides, or Mesue.

In the period known as Al-Andalus, cannabis was intensely cultivated and used for both its "industrial hemp" and "marijuana" sides, including food, fiber, medicine, and recreation.

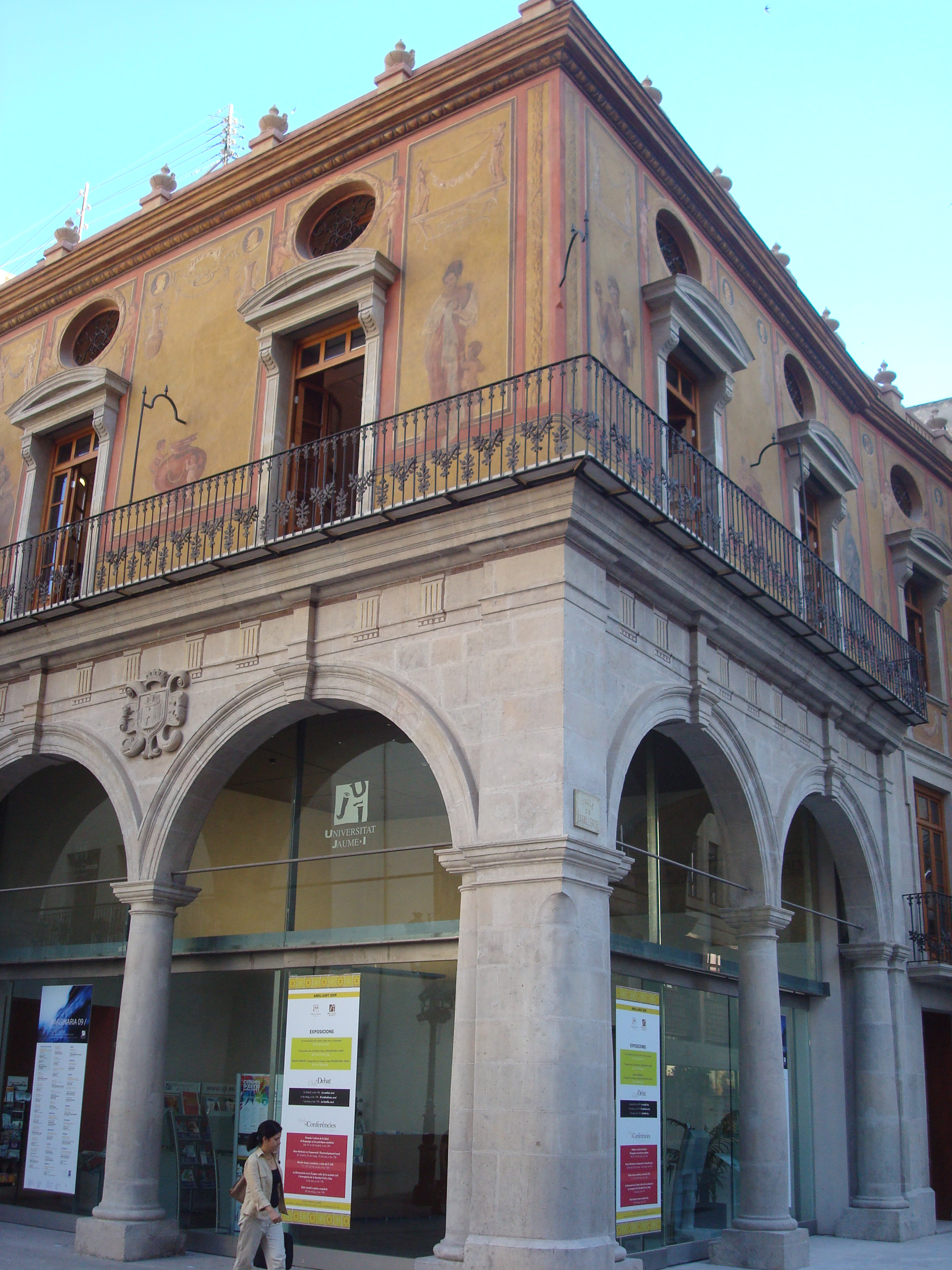
Hemp Llotja, a 1600s dedicated cannabis fibre trade market in Castellón

The seeds and seeded tops of cannabis plants were often called "sedenegi" (also šedenegi, šahdānaŷ, and other forms), a word from Persian origins meaning "King of Grains". The plant was also referred to under other names, such as aixís, al-hachicha, alhaxis, alhaxina, al-quinnab, al-qinnab al-barrī, qinnab al-barrīyya, al-qinnab al-hindī, al-qinnab al-bustānī, al-qinnam, alquînnam, al-qunaynaba, axix, banq, banhy, linho alcanave, qinnab rūmī, quinnam, waraq al-sahdanay, zarréat quîuam, etc.

The cultivation and use of cannabis continued in Catholic Spain, after the Reconquista. In 1555, Dr. Miguel Juan Pascual published a pamphlet in defense of cannabis cultivation, testifying to the important presence in the Catalonia and Valencian regions, stating that:

there are many very healthy cities and towns in Hispania, despite having a great abundance of both cannabis crops and their softening. It is evident that in the towns known as Xàtiva, Tarragona, Alcanyís, Requena, Utiel, Vilanova, l'Hospitalet de l'Infant and Alcarràs, the vast majority of people enjoy a healthy life and old age.

== Contemporary Spain ==
Regular use of cannabis in Spain (recreational and medicinal)

The use of cannabis products is decriminalized for personal cultivation and use, and other purposes other than sale or trade. It's illegal for trade or commercial purposes. Using the legal grey areas in Spanish legislation, cannabis clubs are a popular way for enthusiasts to obtain and use cannabis as a technically legal private collective. In private places, consumption and possession of reasonable amounts (up to 100 grams (3.5 oz)) is legal.

=== Legality ===
==== Psychoactive cannabis ====
Sale and importation of any quantity of cannabis is a criminal offence, punishable by jail time. The purchase, possession and consumption of cannabis in a public place constitutes a civil infraction punishable by a fine and confiscation of the product. Consumption and cultivation by adults in a private space is legal, the latter due to a legal vacuum and provided that it is shown to be for one's own consumption. Cannabis plants that are located somewhere visible from the street/public place (i.e. from balconies) are considered a serious administrative offense, which leads to a fine from 601 to €30,000.

Cannabis laws in Spain can vary by autonomous community. For example, in June 2017, Catalonia legalised the cultivation, consumption and distribution of cannabis for members of designated cannabis clubs. The clubs must be self-sufficient non-profit organisations and only distribute cannabis to those aged 18 years old and over. Cannabis clubs in Catalonia are also limited to producing 150kg of dried cannabis a year and must follow rules intended to stop drug tourism. In July 2021, it was revealed that the cannabis clubs in Barcelona were facing being shut down due to the supreme court cutting out a legal loophole that had allowed them to exist. As of April 2022, clubs were still operating in Barcelona when it was revealed that some have been used by drug trafficking networks.

The political party Podemos supports legalising and regulating cannabis in Spain. In 2021, the political party Más País introduced a motion to legalise the recreational use of cannabis in Spain. It was supported by Unidas Podemos, an electoral alliance of which Podemos is part of. However, the governing Spanish Socialist Workers' Party voted against the motion.

==== Cannabis social clubs ====
Hundreds of cannabis consumption clubs and user associations have been established throughout Spain, as early as 1991. The number of active private "cannabis clubs" existing in Spain is subject to variations and interpretation, but an overwhelming majority of them are located in Barcelona (Catalonia) alone.

All actions related to cannabis apart from sale or trade are not considered criminal offenses, and normally are misdemeanors punishable by a fine. These "asociaciones cannábicas" (cannabis associations, cannabis users associations) are established as non-profit associations that grow cannabis on behalf of their members, and distribute the harvest to their members in exchange for the costs of production (which allow to avoid the legal classification as "sale", hence remaining within the legal boundaries of the non-criminalized activities of personal cultivation and possession). The legal status of these clubs remains however uncertain and subject to variations depending on the case, the judge, and the region.

The evolution of the legal status of cannabis social clubs in Spain has a complex history, with important key dates:

- In 1997, four members of the first club, the Barcelona-based ARSEC (Ramón Santos Association of Cannabis Studies, "Asociación Ramón Santos de Estudios del Cannabis"), were sentenced to four months in prison and a 3000 euro fine, while at about the same time, the court of Bilbao ruled that another club was not in violation of the law.
- The Andalusian regional government also commissioned a study by criminal law professors on the "Therapeutic use of cannabis and the creation of establishments of acquisition and consumption. The study concluded that such clubs are legal as long as they distribute only to a restricted list of legal adults, provide only the amount of drugs necessary for immediate consumption, and not earn a profit. The Andalusian government never formally accepted these guidelines and the legal situation of the clubs remains insecure. In 2006 and 2007, members of these clubs were acquitted in trial for possession and sale of cannabis and the police were ordered to return seized crops."
- In 2017, the citizens' popular initiative "La Rosa Verda" (the green rose) collected enough support in the autonomous region of Catalonia to file a bill for consideration by the Parliament of Catalonia. The bill was adopted with an overwhelming majority, but cancelled by the Constitutional Court of Spain a few months later, in the context of the failed 2017 Catalan declaration of independence.
- In 2023, the new Mayor of Barcelona, Jaume Collboni, pledged to close all cannabis social clubs in the city, with his deputy in charge of security, Albert Batlle, referred to cannabis use as "a basic element of conflictuality" in the city and pledging the "prohibition of cannabis clubs". In early 2024, local organizations and federations of cannabis clubs of the region, including Luz Verde, ICEERS, Metzineres, started to organize protests against the closures and judicial prosecutions of Barcelona cannabis clubs, and sought international support.

==== Medical uses of cannabis ====
In October 2005, the autonomous government in the region of Catalonia launched a program of therapeutic use of Sativex for 600 patients of a wide set of illnesses, from multiple sclerosis to cancer, in order to avoid nausea or to relax tense muscles. The project involves six hospitals, forty researchers and sixty drugstores. The product is presented as an atomizer to be taken orally, and it will be delivered at drugstores inside some hospitals. The full text of the research initiative can be seen, in Catalan, from the Universitat Autònoma de Barcelona. Medical cannabis is available for certain conditions, such as chronic pain, epilepsy, cancer-related symptoms, and multiple sclerosis.

=== Contemporary Spanish cannabis culture ===
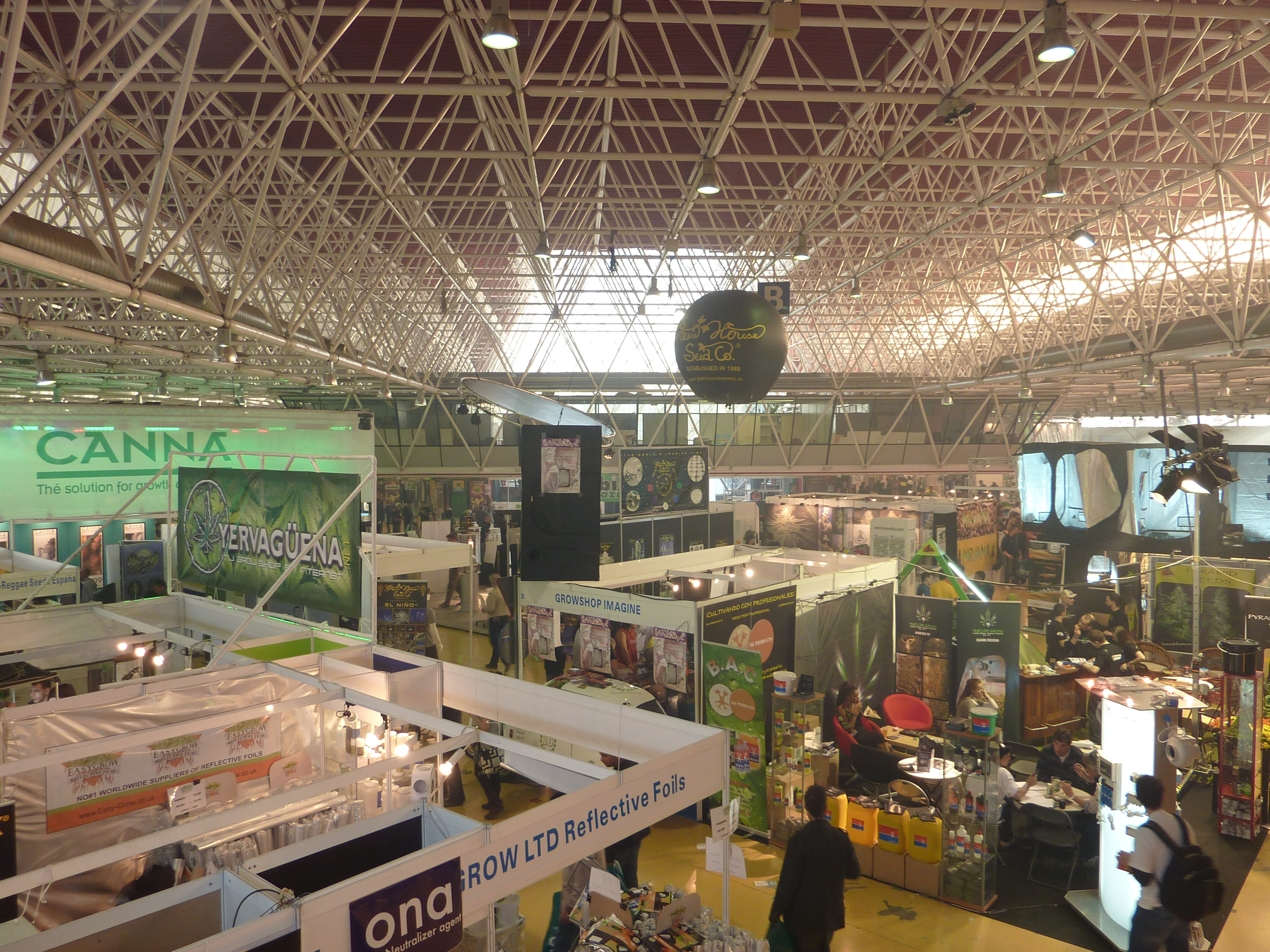
"Spannabis" convention, 2010

Spain is spoken of as the "new Amsterdam," a destination for marijuana tourists.

==== Cannabis media ====
The Revista Cáñamo (literally "Hemp magazine") is the main media of Spanish cannabis communities, founded in 1993. There are other cannabis-specific media such as Soft Secrets Spain, Cannabis Magazine, or Tricomics.

==== Political parties ====
Several political parties focused on cannabis have been active in Spain: Cannabis Party for Legalisation and Normalisation (2003–2006), the RCN-NOK (2010–2021), and Luz Verde (2021–present).
