= José Carlos Bouso =

Spanish pharmacologist expert in psychedelics

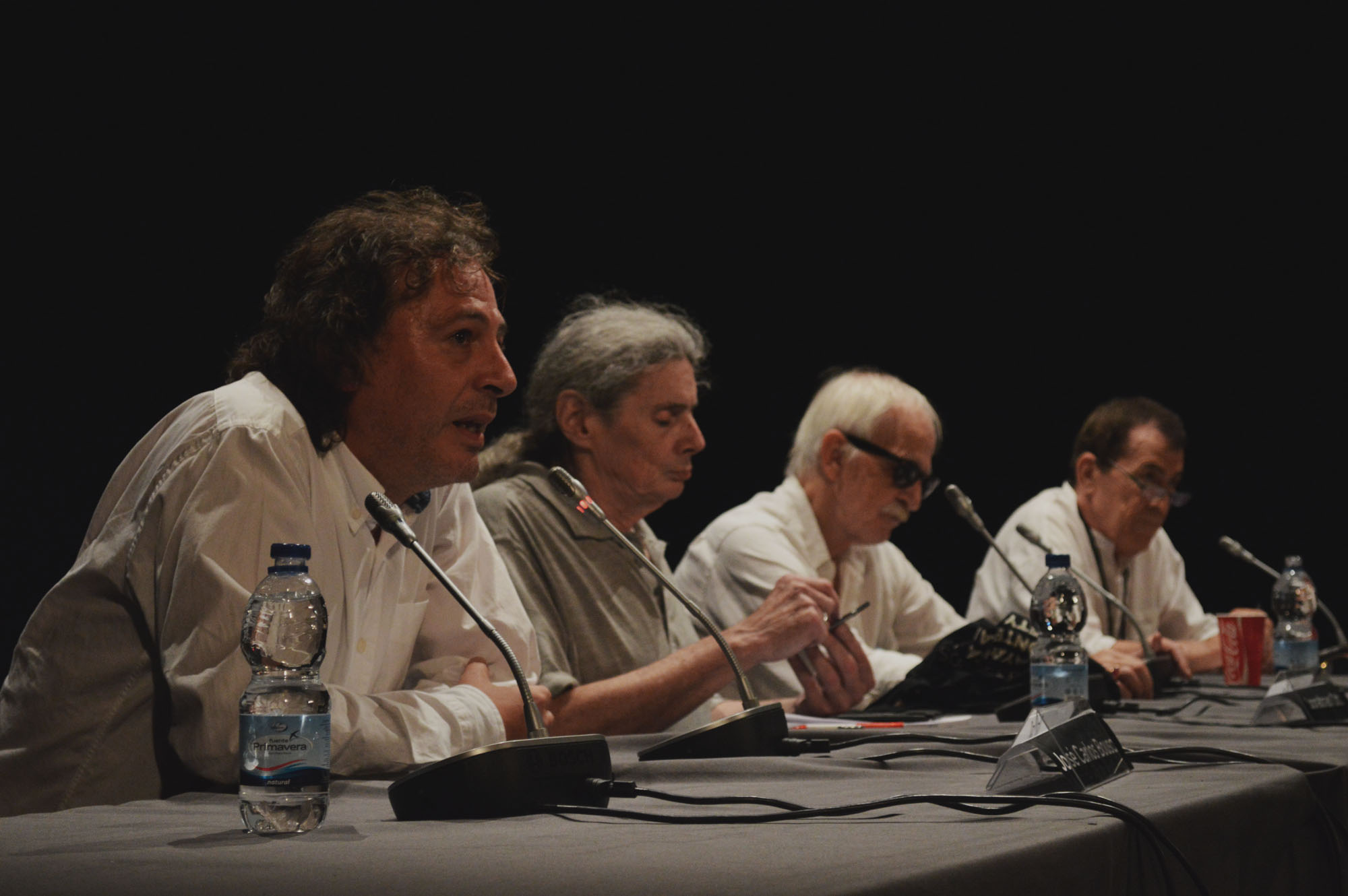
- J.C. Bouso (front left) during the 2014 "World Ayahuasca Conference" in Ibiza, together with Jonathan Ott, Antonio Escohotado and Fernando Sánchez Dragó
- Education: Autonomous University of Madrid, Autonomous University of Barcelona
- Known for: Clinical research into ayahuasca, MDMA, iboga, cannabis, ketamine
- Scientific career
- Fields: Clinical Psychology, Psychopharmacology, Psychedelic research, Traditional medicine
- Workplaces: Scientific director, International Center for Ethnobotanical Education, Research and Service; Visiting professor, University of São Paulo; Member, Medical Anthropology Research Center (University of Rovira i Virgili); Scientific director, Clínica Synaptica (Barcelona)

José-Carlos Bouso Saiz (born 1970, Madrid, Spain) is a Spanish psychologist and doctor in clinical pharmacology known for his work on psychedelic therapy, particularly ayahuasca, MDMA, iboga, as well as cannabis.

== Early life and education ==
Born in Madrid, Spain, José Carlos Bouso graduated in psychology at the Universidad Autónoma de Madrid, subsequently obtaining a Ph.D in pharmacology at the Universidad Autónoma de Barcelona.

== Career and research ==
=== Clinical trials ===
Bouso was involved as early as the year 2000 as scientific director of one of the first clinical trials involving MDMA for the treatment of post-traumatic stress disorder (PTSD), with the Multidisciplinary Association for Psychedelic Studies. Bouso criticized ret tape in his early work on MDMA‑assisted psychotherapy, noting that the halting of his clinical investigations into MDMA for PTSD in the early 2000s delayed the field's development in Spain.

Between 2020 and 2025, he was principal investigator, working with Tre Borràs Cabacés, in coordinating the Phase-II clinical trial on the use of ibogaine to "reverse methadone tolerance" held in a hospital in Reus, Catalonia.

=== Research ===
The relation between psychological and mental health, psycho-social wellbeing, lifestyle, and the social and ritualized ceremonies associated with the use of potent psychedelic medicines, and their interactions with the final effect, has long been a topic of interest of Bouso's research. This led him to engage with the interactions between Western medicine and traditional epistemologies and systems of alternative therapy, in particular maintained by indigenous peoples.

During and after the COVID-19 pandemic, Bouso focused on the effects of the use of psychedelics (concurrent, prior or posterior) in mitigating mental health risks associated with the pandemic's social and psychological effects. His interventions often seek to balance the perceived benefits of treatments such as ayahuasca therapy, with the need for set and setting and attention given to the context, environment, and practices. Bouso has claimed that the findings from his work helps "emphasize the importance of a responsible and well-prepared setting for those seeking healing through ayahuasca."

==== Selected publications ====
Some of Bouso's publications are available in English:

- Sánchez, Constanza; Bouso, José Carlos (2015). Ayahuasca: From the Amazon to the Global Village. Vol. 43. Amsterdam: TNI / Drug Policy Briefings.
- Jiménez-Garrido, Daniel F.; Gómez-Sousa, María; Ona, Genís; Dos Santos, Rafael G.; Hallak, Jaime E. C.; Alcázar-Córcoles, Miguel Ángel; Bouso, José Carlos (2020). "Effects of ayahuasca on mental health and quality of life in naïve users: A longitudinal and cross-sectional study combination". Scientific Reports. 10 (1) 4075. Bibcode:2020NatSR..10.4075J. doi:10.1038/s41598-020-61169-x. PMC 7057990. PMID 32139811.
- Bouso, José Carlos; Révész, Dóra; Ona, Genís; Rossi, Giordano N.; Rocha, Juliana M.; dos Santos, Rafael G.; Hallak, Jaime E. C.; Alcázar-Corcoles, Miguel Ángel (2023). "Longitudinal and transcultural assessment of the relationship between hallucinogens, well-being, and post-traumatic growth during the COVID-19 pandemic". Scientific Reports. 13 (1) 14052. Bibcode:2023NatSR..1314052B. doi:10.1038/s41598-023-41199-x. PMC 10495368. PMID 37696900.
- Bouso, José Carlos; Ona, Genís; Kohek, Maja; Dos Santos, Rafael G.; Hallak, Jaime E. C.; Alcázar-Córcoles, Miguel Ángel; Obiols-Llandrich, Joan (2023). "Hallucinations and Hallucinogens: Psychopathology or Wisdom?". Culture, Medicine and Psychiatry. 47 (2): 576–604. doi:10.1007/s11013-022-09814-0. ISSN 1573-076X. PMC 9838303. PMID 36633720.

Bouso has published a number of other books and journal articles in Spanish, in particular on topics related to psilocybin and psilocybin mushroom, medical cannabis, as well as coca leaf.

== Advocacy and public involvement ==
In the 2010s, Bouso has been involved with medical cannabis research and public advocacy as well as with the World Ayahuasca Conference. Bouso has been involved in public discussions related to his fields of research, e.g. delivering talks like "Ayahuasca from the point of view of psychology: from phenomenology to therapeutic effects." [La ayahuasca vista desde la psicología: de la fenomenología a los effectos terapéuticos.] in Barcelona.

In recent years, the publication of his book Medicina psiquedélica: Manual para pacientes, clínicos, usuarios y curiosos [Psychedelic medicine: Manual for patients, clinicians, users and curious people]. Madrid: Kairos. 2025. brought him to the arena of public debate on psychedelics, in Spain and Latin America, getting to be dubbed "the wiseman of psychedelic therapy" by Spanish national television.

Following the approval of MDMA-assisted psychotherapy in a number of countries, Bouso has focused on the potential of MDMA therapies in Spain.

== See also ==
- International Center for Ethnobotanical Education, Research and Service
- Multidisciplinary Association for Psychedelic Studies
- Tre Borràs Cabacés
- Metzineres
- Jonathan Ott
