= Tre Borràs Cabacés =

Spanish psychiatrist, harm reduction specialist (born 1958)

Teresa Borràs Cabacés
- Born: July 25, 1958 (age 67); Reus, Spain
- Other names: Tre Borràs, Dr. Tre
- Education: University of Rovira i Virgili
- Occupations: Psychiatrist, psychotherapist, researcher, author
- Years active: 1984–2023
- Known for: Harm reduction, supervised injection sites, drug checking, ibogaine research
- Notable work: "Green Witch project" (documentary); Ibogaine clinical trial

Teresa Borràs Cabacés (Reus, Spain, 25 July 1958), known in Spain as Tre Borràs or Dr. Tre, is a Spanish psychiatrist, psychotherapist, author and researcher, specializing in drug use and dependence and the responsible use of drugs.

== Biography ==
After graduating from the Autonomous University of Barcelona, Borràs started working at the "Sant Joan de Deu" University Hospital of Reus, a medium-sized city in Tarragona province (Catalonia, Spain). She directed the service of mental health and substance use hosted by the Hospital between 1984 and 2023, and coordinated the municipality's plan of action on drugs (Pla d'accions sobre drogues) between 2004 and 2023.

Borràs is known for her interdisciplinarity approach to drug use and dependence, and for pioneering a number of harm reduction services:

- Opening of one of the first supervised injection sites in Europe, in 1999,
- Creation of a peer-support network (ARSU, Associació Reus Som Útils),
- Set-up of needle and syringe programmes in pharmacies, and dispensing machines,
- Clinical trial on the use of the traditional African psychedelic ibogaine for the treatment of opioid dependence, in collaboration with the International Center for Ethnobotanical Education, Research and Service foundation,
- A gender perspective in the response to mental health, recreational use of drugs and substance use disorders, including partnerships with Metzineres. One of the outputs is the documentary "Green Witch project" about "the use of cannabis by different groups of women from a broad perspective of harm and risk reduction",
- A response to drug-related issues integrating social and psychological aspects, beyond the unique focus on the substance and neural or biological mechanisms,
- Fostering of public debate and conferences in connection with various social and political stakeholders,
- Creation of a drug checking service, the "Isolab Reus" to analyze adulterated drugs in connection with the Trans-European Drug Information network,
- Eradicating hepatitis C virus among people who use drugs attending her services, as early as 2021.

=== Removal and controversy ===
In April 2023, the dismissal of Dr. Borràs as head of both the hospital service and the municipal action plan was reported, raising suspicions about the continuity of the health and social care model she had leadered in Reus. Local stakeholders analyzed her dismissal of Borràs as "a clear disavowal of the orientation followed by it up to now".

A petition opposing her dismissal, and demanding the continuation of the services pioneered by Dr Borràs reportedly received 2000 supports, including international organizations such as Harm Reduction International, International Drug Policy Consortium, or INPUD.

== See also ==
- Metzineres
- International Center for Ethnobotanical Education, Research and Service
- International Network of People who Use Drugs
- Harm reduction
- Feminism
- Supervised injection site
- Needle and syringe programmes
