= Swedish Drug Users Union =

Swedish non-profit organization

Organization
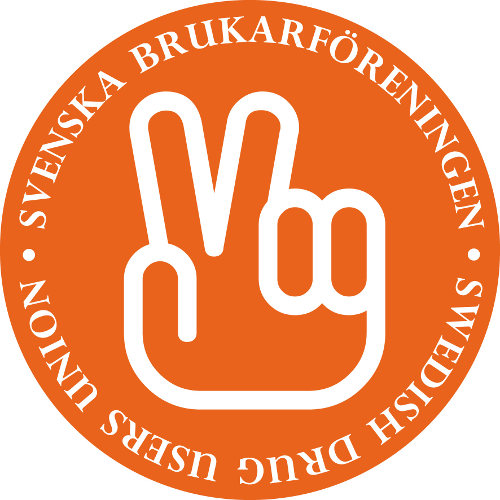
- SBF logo
- Name: Swedish Drug Users Union
- Type: Non-profit
- Location: Stockholm Sweden
- Founded: 2002
- Members: ca 1500 (2010)
- Chairman: Berne Stålenkrantz
- Website: http://www.svenskabrukarforeningen.se

The Swedish Drug Users Union (SDUU, in Swedish: Svenska Brukarföreningen or SBF) is a non-profit NGO founded in October 2002 by a group of people who use drugs associated to Opiate Substitution Treatment programs in Sweden. SDUU has local chapters in Stockholm, Gothenburg, Halmstad, Kalmar, Skåne, Örebro, Umeå, Skellefteå and Piteå.

== Goals and priorities ==
”Nothing about us without us” is the core philosophy of the organization, which means that all groups must be represented by themselves and speak on their own behalf. For example, the board of directors should only include the target group. It is stated in their statues that only users can be on the board. SDUU's ideology consists of:

- make a clear distinctions between prevention, organized crime, and harm reduction;
- combat any care ideology;
- combat the stigmatization that drug users encounter every day;
- a change of focus from preservation of dogma to preservation of the right to life and health;
- legislative evaluations and steps for change, including the law that says it is illegal to use and to have drugs in your body;
- create an ombudsman for drug users;
- create a harm reduction coordinator.

== Actions ==
SDUU organizes Swedish drug users of both legal- and illicit drugs, opioid/opiate users who have or wants OST/MMT (opioid substitution treatment or methadone maintenance treatment). They also support the idea of maintenance treatment for amphetamine users and other drugs. The work of the organization includes appeals, complaints, support users with different matters such as: apply for maintenance treatment, advocate for patient rights and to convince the healthcare and social workers to see and understand things from the users perspective. The group also write op-eds and carry out advocacy actions.

The non-profit organizes a yearly seminar which focuses on harm reduction. One part of the seminar is an award ceremony for ”Brukarvänspriset” (the user friendly award). Earlier winners include Professor Lars Gunne - the founding father of one of the world's oldest OST (Ulleråker hospital Uppsala founded 1967), Björn Fries - former drug policy coordinator to the government, the needle exchange program in Malmö & Lund, Professor Henrik Tham, Professor Ted Goldberg, The National Board of Health and Welfare and four MPs from the Left wing Party for their stance on decriminalization of personal use.

SDUU cooperate with several European and international organizations that support a drug policy based upon the ideas of harm reduction and human rights. SDUU is a member of the steering committee of the EuroHRN (European Harm Reduction Network) and are the Swedish representatives for INPUD (International Network for People who Use Drugs) and NAMA (National Alliance for Medication Assisted Recovery), they are also associated partner with the Correlation network. In 2007 and 2008, representatives of the organization delivered statements to the United Nations' Committee on Economic, Social and Cultural Rights

== See also ==
- Harm reduction
- Drug policy of Sweden
- International Network of People who Use Drugs
- Metzineres
