= Hemp Llotja =

Historic hemp exchange building in Castellón de la Plana, Spain

- Llotja del Cànem (Catalan); Lonja del Cáñamo (Spanish)
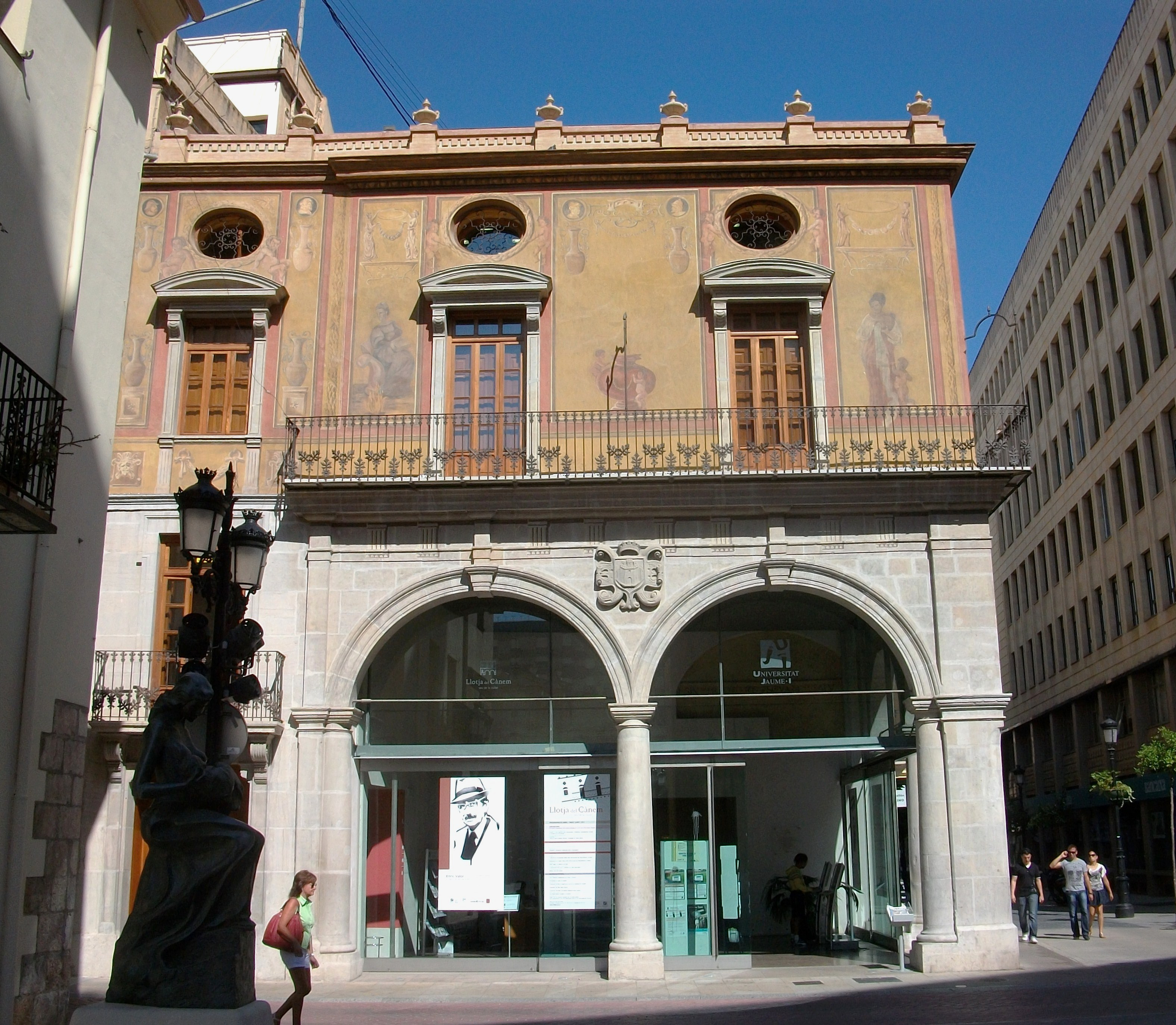
- Interactive map of Hemp Llotja
- 39°59′11″N 0°02′13″W
- Location: Castellón de la Plana, Valencian Community, Spain

History
- Built: 1606–1617

Site notes
- Governing body: Universitat Jaume I

Spanish Cultural Heritage
- Type: Bien de Interés Cultural
- Designated: 2007

The Hemp Llotja (Catalan: Llotja del Cànem; Spanish: Lonja del Cáñamo) is a historic baroque trading hall in Castellón de la Plana, Valencian Community, Spain. Opened in 1617 to house the city's hemp market, it served as the centre for commercial transactions involving hemp, one of the region's principal agricultural products during the Early Modern period. The building was enlarged in the late 18th century with the addition of an upper floor that preserved the original architectural character. Since 2007 it has housed the city campus and exhibition centre of Jaume I University.

== History ==
The building was commissioned by the municipal council after the purchase and demolition of the Casa Gumbau in 1603. Construction of the open ground floor took place between 1606 and 1617 under the direction of master builder Francesc Galiança. It functioned as the city's hemp exchange, where merchants negotiated the sale of hemp used in the manufacture of rope, sails, driven by maritime traffic.

An upper storey was added in 1792, together with extensions to the ground floor. During the 19th century the façade was reportedly decorated with allegorical paintings by Joaquín Oliet.

The building ceased its commercial role in the early 20th century. It was acquired by Jaume I University in 1999, restored between 2002 and 2007, and reopened on 27 February 2007 as the university's city headquarters and a venue for exhibitions, lectures and cultural events.

== Architecture ==
The Lonja is a square-plan ashlar masonry building located near the Plaça Major. The original structure consists of an open loggia with large semicircular arches resting on Tuscan columns and pilasters. The only sculptural decoration on the ground floor is the city's coat of arms, placed in the spandrels of the arches.

The later upper floor features rectangular windows crowned by curved pediments resting on brackets, elliptical oculi, and a continuous wrought-iron corner balcony. The building is finished with a classical cornice and parapet.

== Hemp cultivation and trade ==
Although present since prehistory and cultivated at least since the times of Al-Andalus, silk was for long the primary production in Castellón plain; hemp cultivation became one of the principal economic activities during the 18th century, supplying raw material for rope-making and the naval industry. According to historian Germán Navarro Espinach, although hemp was cultivated in the region from the Middle Ages, its large-scale commercial expansion did not occur until the mid-18th century, when it became one of the dominant crops of the surrounding irrigated farmland.

== See also ==
- Llotja de la Seda in Valencia
- Bien de Interés Cultural
- History of cannabis
- Cannabis in Spain
