= Penington Institute =

Australian health organisation

Penington Institute is a public health research and drug policy organization based in Carlton, Victoria, Australia. Penington Institute’s namesake and patron, Professor David Penington AC, was one of Australia’s leading public intellectuals and health experts. John Ryan is the chief executive.

Penington Institute produces an annual report on Australian overdose deaths - Australia's Annual Overdose Report. The 2018 report showed that deaths from overdoses, mostly from opioids, had increased across the country consistently since 2003, and significantly outnumbered deaths on the road. Figures are produced detailing deaths for individual areas. Ryan pointed out in 2022 that pharmaceuticals continued to drive overdose deaths in Australia and repeated calls for a National Overdose Prevention Strategy. 2,356 Australians died of overdose in 2022, the latest year for which figures are available, and 80% of these (1,878) were unintentional.

Penington Institute has published the Cannabis in Australia Report since 2022 which aims to fill the gap for accurate, up-to-date data on Australian trends, attitudes and approaches relating to cannabis. Penington Institute supports the decriminalisation of cannabis paired with a carefully regulated cannabis market for adult personal use.

Penington Institute has convened International Overdose Awareness Day since 2012. During the time Penington Institute has convened the awareness day, held on August 31, it has grown and is observed in more than 40 countries with more than 1,000 events held each year.

Penington Institute has been instrumental in driving a variety of initiatives that aim to minimise the harm caused by drugs including Australia's Take Home Naloxone program, Community Overdose Prevention Education or COPE Training and The Bulletin - a specialty publication for workers on the frontline of drug issues in Australia, including needle and syringe program workers. The Bulletin has not been published since 2022 when funding from the Commonwealth Government ceased.

== Patrons ==
Emeritus Professor Sir Gustav Nossal AC CBE (Chief Patron)

Professor The Honourable Dame Marie Bashir AD CVO

Professor Suzanne Cory AC

Emeritus Professor David de Kretser AC

Professor Peter Doherty Nobel Laureate AC FAA FRS

Professor Ian Gust AO

Professor Margaret Hamilton AO

Professor The Honourable Barry Jones AC

The Honourable Michael Kirby AC CMG

Professor Fiona Stanley AC FAA FASSA

Professor David Penington AC (dec.)

== Board of Directors ==
Ms Kathryn Greiner AO (Chair)

Ms Carmel Arthur OAM

Dr Bulent Hass Dellal AO

Professor Nicholas Lintzeris

The Honourable Vernon White

Adjunct Professor Scott Wilson

Mr Mick Palmer AO APM
