= International Overdose Awareness Day =

International Awareness Day

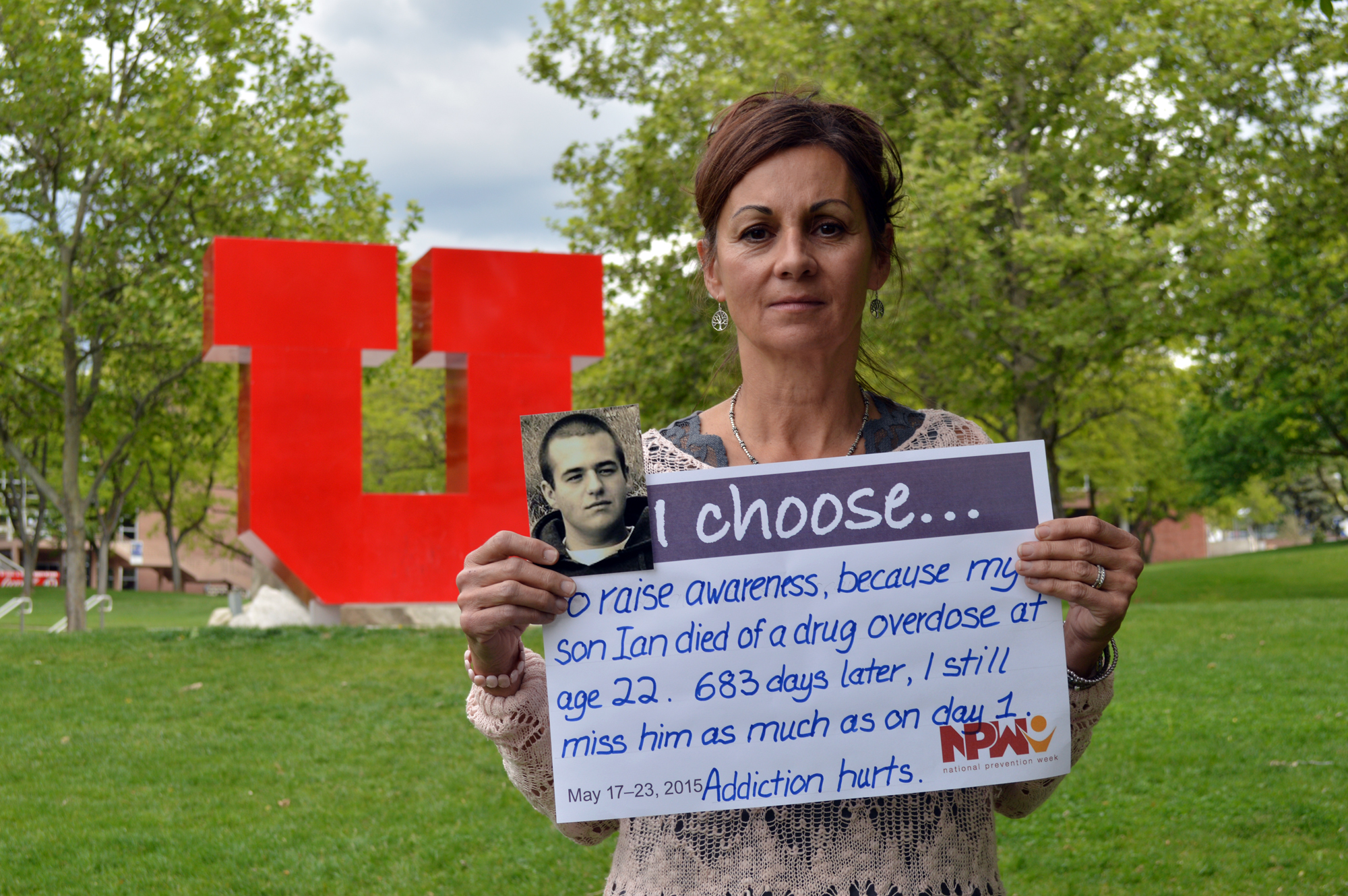
A mother raising awareness to overdoses after losing her son to a drug overdose in 2013

International Overdose Awareness Day (IOAD or Overdose Day) is a global event held on 31 August each year since 2001. Its purpose is to raise awareness of overdoses, reduce the stigma of drug-related deaths and acknowledge the grief felt by families and friends. The first day, held in 2001 in Australia, saw 6,000 silver ribbons distributed across the country and into New Zealand. Since then the day has grown and is recognized in over 40 countries. So too, sadly, has the death toll from overdose continued to rise, particularly in North America.

The silver ribbon and the colour purple are representative symbols of the International Overdose Awareness Day. "Time to remember. Time to act" is the slogan used by campaigners.

== History ==
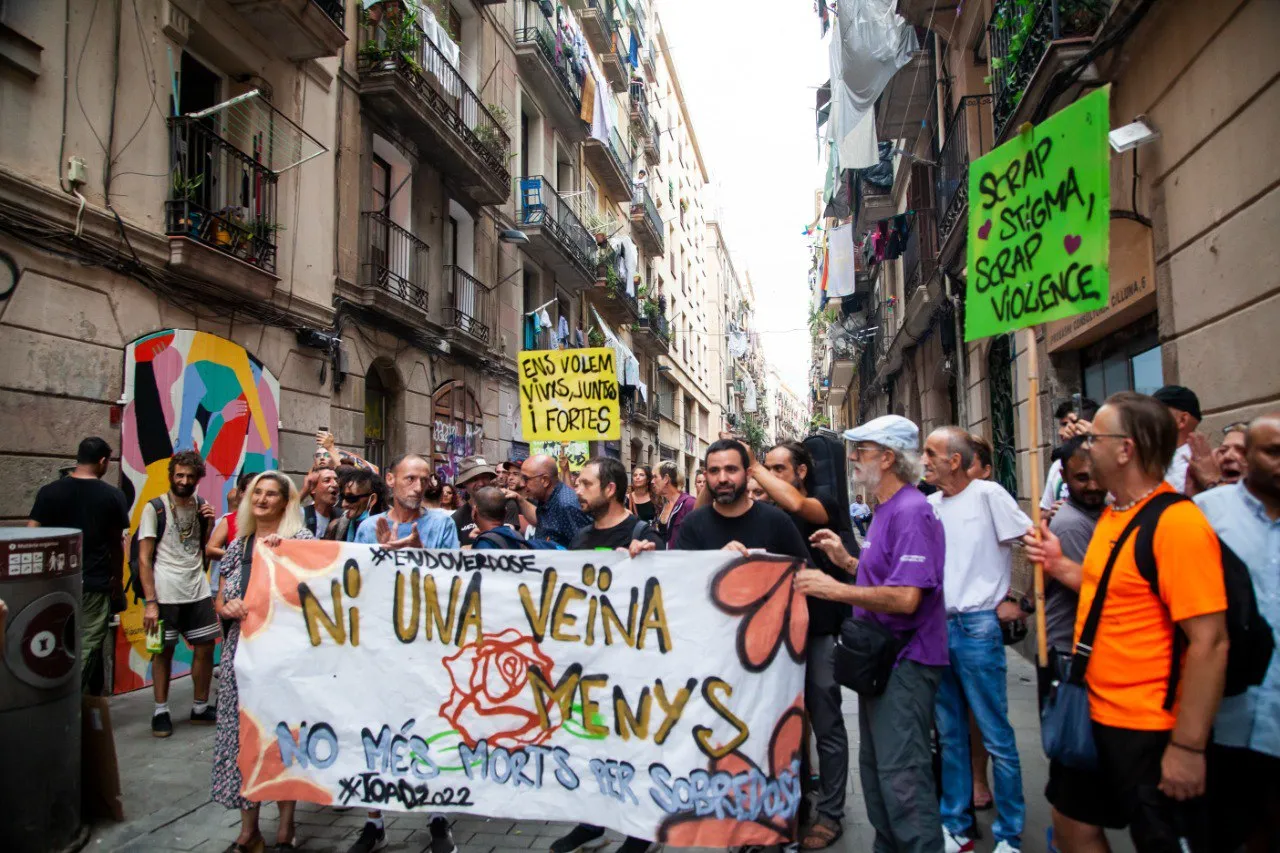
International Overdose Awareness Day 2022 in Barcelona

The IOAD event was initiated in 2001 in Australia by S.J. Finn, then managing a needle and syringe program at the Salvation Army Crisis Centre in St Kilda, Victoria.

The coordination of events globally has been run by the Penington Institute since 2012.

Some events organized over time include:

- 2017: In Philadelphia, United States where 1,217 people died of opioid overdose that year (the highest death rate of any major U.S. city), there were calls for an overdose prevention site in 2018.
- 2018: Vigils were held in Vancouver, Canada where 38 people died of overdose in July 2018. Firefighters in the city attended 6,234 overdose calls in 2017. The Ontario Pharmacists Association issued warnings about the dangers of prescription opioids.
- 2018: The Alcoholism & Drug Abuse Council of Orange County, New York organised a candlelight vigil and remembrance ceremony at the Goshen Village Square. Guests were encouraged to bring a photo or other memento of a loved one.
- 2020: recovery arts organisations were planning live-stream public performances in four cities of the United Kingdom, replicating a successful initiative of 2019. However, they decided to create videos that would be broadcast on Facebook and YouTube due to the social distance measures of the COVID-19 pandemic.
- 2021: Young Liberals of Norway (Unge Venstre) marked the day with placing 260 crosses in front of the Storting. The 260 crosses represented the average 260 people who die of drug-related overdoses in Norway each year, which the political party means is a consequence of the Norwegian government's war on drugs.
- 2022: networks of drug users in Barcelona, Spain organized a walk the city center, pasting silhouettes of neighbours victims of overdose during the current year in remembrance.

The event is organized simultaneously worldwide, with Penington Institute facilitating communication materials and awareness campaigns. International Overdose Awareness Day badges and wristbands depicting the silver ribbon are produced and distributed to local groups globally.

== See also ==
- International Drug Users Remembrance Day
- Drug overdose
- Harm reduction
- Penington Institute
- INPUD
- Substance abuse prevention
