= Drug policy of Sweden =

The drug policy of Sweden is based on zero tolerance focusing on prevention, treatment, and control, aiming to reduce both the supply of and demand for illegal drugs. The general drug policy is supported by all major Swedish political parties with the exceptions of the Left Party – which advocates for the decriminalization of private consumption – and five of the seven major parties' youth wings.

== Legal penalties ==
According to 1 § Narkotikastrafflagen of the Swedish Penal Code, it is a criminal offence to:

- provide narcotics
- produce narcotics which is meant for misuse
- possess narcotics with the intent to supply
- acquire, process, package, transport and store narcotics
- offer narcotics for sale
- possess or trade narcotics-related payments
- convey contact information between buyers and sellers or any other such act if the intent is to promote the trade of narcotics
- possess, use or handle narcotics.

Penalties are divided into four degrees. If the offence is deemed minor, the penalties range from fines to a maximum of six months in jail. Due to a ruling by the Supreme Court, the penalty for minor drug offenses, such as personal use of cannabis or other illegal drugs, is not imprisonment. A typical penalty form for a minor drug offence is around $300 in fines if the person is 18 or older and has a low income. The normal grade of narcotics crime may result in penalties ranging from fines to a maximum of three years in jail. If the crime is deemed a serious narcotics offence, the penalties range from at least two years in jail to a maximum of seven years in jail. Exceptionally serious offences can result in a prison sentence of at least six years and a maximum of ten years.

The number of reported drug crimes has increased sharply in recent years. The increase is primarily due to attempted drug possession reported to the police by postal workers. Previously, it was strictly forbidden for postal employees to report suspicious shipments to the police.

There is also related legislation for mandatory health care that can be used in conjunction with a sentence for a drug-related offense.

== Classification of drugs ==
Substances which are classed as narcotics are categorized into five schedules:

- Schedule I: narcotics which usually do not have medicinal value according to the Swedish Medical Products Agency. It includes heroin, cannabis, psilocybin, khat, LSD, ecstasy and other ecstasy-related substances. Substances on this schedule may not be entered into the country unless they are meant for research or medicinal purposes that are approved by the Medical Products Agency.
- Schedule II: substances which may only be brought into the country in an amount that corresponds to a maximum of five days personal consumption, which has to be justified. It includes amphetamines and other synthetic substances with medicinal value along with cocaine, morphine, methadone, GHB and others.
- Schedule III: substances that are turned into morphine once in the human body such as codeine and dextropropoxyphene. Substances under this schedule abide by the same restrictions as those under Schedule II. Pharmaceutical painkillers that contain codeine or dextropropoxyphene are generally not classed as narcotics unless each individual pill contains at least 100 mg of codeine or at least 135 mg of dextropropoxyphene.
- Schedule IV: sedatives such as barbiturates and benzodiazepine compounds, with the exception of flunitrazepam. Substances on this schedule may be brought into the country at most in an amount that corresponds with three weeks of personal consumption, if the patient resides permanently in Sweden. For persons who are temporarily visiting the country, a maximum supply of three months may be brought in.
- Schedule V: dextromethorphan as well as the sleeping agents zopiclone and zolpidem, among others. The same rules that apply to Schedule IV apply to Schedule V substances.

== Effects ==
A study conducted in 2000 supported the view that the new tougher policy had a preventive effect on drug use. A report by the UNODC praised Sweden for having one of the lowest drug usage rates in the western world, and attributed this to a drug policy that invested heavily in prevention and treatment (including free community services), as well as in strict law enforcement. However, the methodology of the UNODC report has been criticized for being unscientific and fundamentally biased in favour of repressive drug laws, since Sweden was the fourth largest donor to the UNODC in 2007. Additionally, low cocaine use may be due to the relative geographical separation of the country from the major ports of distribution, whereas illicit use of other drugs such as opioids and amphetamine are much more prevalent. Opioid use disorder death rate is much lower in Sweden(2,6 per 100 000) than in the US (15,4 per 100 000) or Canada(6,9 per 100 000)

Two Swedish cities topped the rank in illicit amphetamine use out of the 25 European cities tested in a residual water analysis study in 2022.

According to the European Monitoring Centre for Drugs and Drug Addiction (EMCDDA), in 2005, the rate of drug-related deaths per capita in Sweden was more than twice that of the Netherlands and there were more persons addicted to severe narcotics ("heavy drugs") than in other countries. White House Drug Policy Director Gil Kerlikowske in 2011 cited Sweden's Drug Control Policies as Model for U.S.; prevalence rates for cocaine use in Sweden are barely one-fifth of fellow European countries, such as the United Kingdom and Spain.

Between 2005 and 2013, the EMCDDA recorded a more than doubling in the rate of drug-induced mortality among adults (15–64) in Sweden, with the country moving from having the ninth to having the second highest rate in Europe. There is no evidence that the increase in the number of drug-related deaths is due to an increase in the number of injecting drug users; most indications are that the number of injecting drug users has declined. Comparison of statistic between countries is problematic because countries have different practices for which drugs are included in the statistics and how common it is to carry out a thorough forensic examination. In Sweden, this is handled by the Swedish National Board of Forensic Medicine, the dead persons estate and relatives do not have to pay for this examination, it is paid for with tax money. A large part of the reported deaths in Sweden are linked to various pills that contain other legal or illegal drugs than the classic drugs(Heroin, opium, amphetamine and cocaine).In 2023, 792 drug-deaths (legal or illegal drugs) were found in 5966 forensic examinations. 61 of the 792 contained traces of Heroin, the corresponding figure for Amphetamine was 51, Methadone 62, Alpraxzolam 105, Oxycodone 96, Buprnorfin 71, Alimemazin 63, Tramadol 63, Zipiklon 79, Cocaine 36 ... Statistics are published for the 15 most common drugs. Many bodies had traces of more than one drug.

There are several other causes behind the increase in the reported number. A 2020 study from the Finnish Institute for Health and Welfare reported the death rate from drug overdose in Sweden was of 6.46 per 100.000 inhabitants, second only to Iceland and nearly triple the average of Europe.

== History ==
Historically, Sweden had been a poor country with a comparably low standard of living. Although it is a member of the vodka belt and has a tradition of widespread tobacco use, other drugs were rarely used until the mid-20th century. The 19th century saw the rise of the temperance movement, alongside free churches and the labour movement. State alcohol rationing, state monopoly on retail stores in alcohol, and temperance boards in the municipalities were introduced around the First World War. This resulted in low levels of alcohol use throughout the 1930s. The temperance boards continued to exist after alcohol rationing ended in 1955.

=== The first narcotics law ===
The first official narcotics law came in 1923 with the Royal Ordinance on Narcotic Drugs, or Narkotikakungörelsen, when Sweden had ratified the First International Opium Convention into their law as well. The law regulated the import and export of some opiates and cocaine. In 1930, the law was extended to include more opium derivatives and cannabis. Possession was restricted as well. Initially, the punishments consisted of fines.

Before Narkotikakungörelsen, a person's use of drugs was considered a personal choice of the user and their doctor. Non-medical drug use was rarely seen, but did exist among medical personnel, bohemian artists, writers and jazz musicians. Often the drugs used were supplied by prescription.

=== Introduction of amphetamines ===
In 1938, amphetamine was introduced in Sweden, and a year later required a prescription. In 1942, approximately 3% of the Swedish population had a prescription for amphetamine, while the vast majority used under five amphetamine tablets per year, about 3,000 citizens were known to take it daily and among them about 200 used over 10 amphetamine tablets per day. In 1942, amphetamine was added to the list of controlled substances. Gradually the supervisory authority, the Royal Medical Board, made more stringent recommendations for prescribing narcotic drugs.

Sometime in the late 1940s, a group of artists began dissolving amphetamine tablets in water so that it could be purified and injected intravenously. This habit was soon taken up among drug users in Stockholm.

=== Early changes in the drug laws ===
In the 1950s, there were signs of emerging drug use in Stockholm. On 27 April 1954, the first debate was held in the Riksdag, the Swedish parliament, regarding drug use. The center-right opposition had filed an interpellation about the drug problem. The issue discussed was whether the government considered that drug use justified an increased vigilance by society and, if so, if it was considering a change in the laws to rectify the problem. The Riksdag believed that further debate was unnecessary since information, collected from the Royal Medical Board and the Police, stated that drug abuse was not a serious problem in Sweden.

In 1958, the punishments became harsher, setting a minimum fine and introducing up to six months imprisonment as a possible penalty. In 1962, the law was superseded by the Decree on Narcotic Drugs, Narkotikaförordningen, which increased the maximum prison term to two years. Amphetamines became the primary illicit drug until the late 1960s, when cannabis became more popular.

In 1965, the maximum term was reduced to one year. There were signs of increasing drug use; hashish was smoked openly in major cities in the late 60s. The National Board of Health and Welfare, the agency that superseded the Royal Medical Board, argued that police would use the resources better than the prison system. The intention was to arrest more drug offenders, given the hope that a higher risk of getting caught in itself would have a more preventative effect then a long sentence.

=== The Legal Prescription Program ===
In 1965, the legal prescription of drugs began in Stockholm, after a campaign strongly supported by Expressen, the biggest newspaper in Sweden in the 1960s. Some doctors received the right to prescribe drugs, such as amphetamine and morphine, to addicts. The idea was that doctors would have the right to prescribe the drug to chronic addicts in order to reduce their propensity to commit crimes. An inspiration for this movement was a book, The Addict and the Law, written by American sociologist Alfred R. Lindesmith. The Legal Prescription Program was controversial from the start; the users were allowed to determine the dosage and were given a few days ration with an option to refill when needed. More than 4 million normal doses were prescribed. The program grew from 10 to 120 patients, but after just one year, doctor Sven-Erik Åhström was the only physician to remain. He believed the patients should control their dosage and he allowed patients to take their prescriptions home asking for more whenever they ran out earlier than expected. After a two-year period, “a total of four million dosages of amphetamine (15 kilos; 33 lb) and 600,000 dosages of opiates (3.3 kilos; 7¼ lb) had been prescribed to 120 patients". A number of the clients were former prison inmates. Eventually, police seizures showed that the drugs had become available to persons not involved in the project. Such disastrous results opened the door for Nils Bejerot's theories on drug use to gain popularity.

Nils Bejerot opposed the prescriptions and worked as consulting physician to the Stockholm Remand Prison. He conducted studies of injections marks from drug abuse at the prison which indicated a strong increase in the number of intravenous drug users during the experiment. The project ended in 1967, when a young girl was found dead from an overdose of morphine and amphetamine in the apartment of one of the participants.

=== Drug Commission of 1968 ===
A rapid increase in amphetamine, hashish, LSD and opiates use in the 1960s, brought a change from a permissive to a more restrictive drug policy In the end of the 1960s, Stockholm had probably one of the highest rates of cannabis use in Europe; in 1971, 30–35% of the 16-year-old students in Stockholm replied that they had smoked hashish or marijuana Jonas Hartelius, scientific adviser to the Swedish Carnegie Institute, stated that another factor which had had a significant impact on the Swedish drug policy from the 1960s and onwards was an "Independent debate outside the establishment, and the mobilizing of public opinion against drugs have been of crucial importance for the development of the Swedish control of narcotic drugs." The local temperance boards came about in the 1960s to work with drug abusers. In 1970, the municipal temperance boards merged in with the boards for social welfare and child social welfare

The Narcotic Drugs Penalty Code of 1968, including an increase of the maximum penalty for sale of illegal drugs from 2 to 6 years in prison. The law distinguish between three grades of drug offences. Section 1 was applied for offences of normal severity: illegal production, offering for sale, transfer, and possession of narcotics were punishable by fines or imprisonment for not more than two years. Section 2 was applied for petty offences; punishable by fines only, nolle prosequi was easy to receive for minor drug crimes in the 1970s. Section 3 was applied for gross offences, punishable by imprisonment for between one and four years. When determining whether the offence was gross, special attention was to be paid to whether it was committed professionally, on a large scale, involved large amounts of drugs, or whether it was especially dangerous. But these were only examples of relevant factors; their presence was not a guarantee the offence was gross, and their absence did not mean the offence could not still be gross. The preparatory works mention that transfer of drugs to young people could lead to the offence's classification as gross. The danger of the drug involved was also to be taken into consideration. The Prosecutor General expressed the view that substances which threaten life or rapidly debilitate the addict should lead to the application of section 3 of the Narcotic Drugs Penalty Code. This group included opium derivatives, like heroin, as well as LSD.

In 1969, fearing that low punishments would attract international drug traffickers, the government increased punishments for crimes involving the most gross degree, and the corresponding laws on smuggling were increased to a maximum penalty of six years. Hemp, which had been grown for industrial purposes, had not been affected by the opium conference in 1925. However, in 1970 cultivation of hemp was banned on the grounds that it was a drug. In 1972, the Narcotic Drugs Penalty Code was strengthened again, increasing the maximum prison sentence to ten years for more severe crimes.

1969–72, was a period of temporarily increased police resources for drug law enforcement but also frequent waiving of persecution for possession of illegal substances. In 1969, about 750 police took part in a short-term, fivefold increase in the numbers of officers engaged in drug enforcement. The resources allocated to drug work steadily decreased between 1970 and 1975.

1972–75, was a period with much lower police resources for drug-related crimes; the number of police officers dedicated to drug crimes was almost cut to the low level before 1970.

In 1976–79, the Prosecutor General recommended that prosecutors lower the limit for drugs which could be ignored as personal use. Tougher prosecution policies were introduced by the chief prosecutor in Stockholm, and resources for drug law enforcement were again increased. From 1971 to 1983, use of illegal drugs among 16-year-old boys fell from about 16% to 5%.

=== Subsequent policy changes ===
In the 1980s and 1990s, lawmakers continued to make smaller modifications of the drug laws, expanding their coverage, increasing maximum sentences, altering early release rules, and introducing treatment options as an alternative to imprisonment to be used at the discretion of the courts.

==== 1980s ====
In 1980, contract treatment for drug abuse as an alternative to imprisonment was implemented into the law. Contract treatment is a possible consequence of a clearly drug-related crime, and an option for any Swedish court; the option is not limited to special Drug courts. If the person misbehaves, the sentence can be transformed into a prison sentence. In 1981, the maximum imprisonment for ordinary crimes increased from two years to three. The minimum imprisonment for serious crimes increased from one year to two.

In 1982, the Misuser Act (LVM) made it possible for municipalities to place very seriously drug dependent criminals in mandatory treatment with restrictions for a number of months. The same type of law had been used only for very serious alcoholics in the past. Mandatory treatment, according to this law, has been used for a hundreds people per year; in 2007, it was used for 330 people with serious drug problems, and 219 with both alcohol and drug problems.

In 1988, all use of drugs, even in very small quantities, became a criminal offense, punishable with fines, under The Narcotic Drugs Penalty Code of 1968. In the same year, a special form of probation, contract treatment, became available as an alternative to imprisonment in cases of alcohol or drug-related crime. This treatment was available only to offenders willing to undergo the drug or alcohol treatment as decided by the courts.

==== 1990s ====
In the beginning of the 1990s, Sweden had a financial crisis with up to 500% as the interest rate. This hurt the local economy with the cutting of tax financed social budgets. For example, the number of residential treatment places decreased by 40%. Many specialized drugs squads all over the country disappeared.

In 1993, the maximum sentence for illicit use of drugs was raised to six months in prison, though the normal punishment remained a fine. The reason for raising the maximum penalty for drug use to six months' imprisonment was to make it legal for police to conduct a body search, which may only be implemented if someone is suspected of a crime carrying at least six months' imprisonment as the maximum punishment.

In the same year, the law was amended to allow for early release of all prisoners, not only those convicted of drug crimes. Between 1983 and 1993, in principle, prisoners were released after serving half the time. For those who were convicted after 1 July 1993, the rule became two-thirds of the imprisonment term. After 1999, early release became conditional.

On 1 January 1995, Sweden became a member of the European Union (EU). One effect of the EU's rules was reduced control of illicit drugs at the borders. The Swedish customs authority stop making random stops on the traffic and passengers who enter from EU countries; the number of employees in the Swedish customs authority is reduced by a third.

==== 2000s ====
Surveys of illicit drug showed use in the last month almost doubled drug use among 16-year-old boys (from 5% to 10%, mostly cannabis) in 2000. The level had been essentially stable since 1983 (below 5% usage in the last month for boys and 2% usage for girls).

Between 2000 and 2001, professor Johannes Knutsson concludes after a study of drug use and drug policy in Sweden that the "stricter enforcement contributed to Sweden by international standards has a lower percentage of young people who tried drugs."

==== 2020s ====
In 2023, the government of Ulf Kristersson proposed increased criminal penalties, such as criminalizing attempts and the conspiring to commit a narcotics offense, as well as increasing the minimum penalty for narcotics possession where there is an intent to distribute to six months imprisonment. Attempting and conspiring to commit a narcotics offense with the goal of personal consumption would be left out of the criminalized area.

=== National Alcohol and Drug Action Plan ===
In 2002, Parliament approved the National Alcohol and Drug Action Plan for the years 2002–2006.

"The objective of the Swedish drug policy should continue to be a drug-free society. The main focus of drug policy is focused and concerted efforts to limit both supply and demand of drugs. Strengthened efforts are needed to strengthen the political priority of the drugs, to improve cooperation between different authorities and between authorities and organisations, to improve the preventive work among other things through the method and skills development, development of care through, inter alia, methodology and skills development and research, develop treatment perspective of prison, streamlining operations in the field of control, improve the methods to comply with drug development and society's efforts, and to increase international cooperation. The government sets up a special national drugs coordinator with the task of implementing and monitoring the action plan and sets aside 325 MSEK extra over three years to implement the Action Plan." (Prop. 2001/02:91)

From 2001 to 2003, the number of 16-year-old boys who had used illegal drugs in the past month fell from 10% to 7%.

In 2005, in compliance with EU rules, cultivation of industrial hemp with less than 0.2% THC was legalized – providing the farmer followed a number of rules such as yearly registration of the field.

In 2005, the Prosecutor General issued a recommendation containing more than 100 pages to prosecutors about penalties they will require for drug offenses based on previous judgments of the Supreme Court in Sweden. The report also contained a classification of hazard of more than 50 different drugs. The recommendation was expanded for a revised edition in 2009 and 2010.

In 2006, Parliament approved an updated National Alcohol and Drug Action Plan for the years 2006–2010. The strategy was similar to the 2002 plan. The overall objective of the Swedish drugs policy is: a drug-free society. There are three sub-objectives:

- reduce recruitment to drug abuse
- induce people with substance abuse problems to give up their abuse
- reduce the supply of drugs

In 2007, an updated study showed a continued decline in drug use among pupils and high school students. Police efforts to combat drug use focused on drug supply prior to 1980, data support the conclusion that it had a preventive effect. As police efforts began to focus on demand reduction (from 1980 to 1992) drug use of cannabis continued to drop. Among 9th year students, drug experimentation was highest in the beginning of the 1970s. Drug experimentation was falling throughout the 1980s, redoubling in the 1990s, and falling again in the 2000s. Estimates of heavy drug addicts have risen from 6,000 in 1967 to 15,000 (1979), 19,000 (1992), and 26,000 (1998). According to inpatient data, there were 28,000 such addicts in 2001 and 26,000 in 2004, but these last two figures may represent the recent trend in Sweden towards out-patient treatment of drug addicts rather than an actual decline in drug addictions. Amphetamines are still the drug most used by problem drug users, whereas heroin is the main problem in most of Europe.

Between 2006 and 2013, drug-induced mortality rates in Sweden have risen steadily, with the country moving from having the ninth to the second highest rate in Europe.

From 1 April 2011, the police and customs may seize synthetic drugs that are not on the list of drugs covered by the anti-drug laws if the police suspect that the purpose of the holding is related to drug abuse. It's about synthetic drugs that manufacturers changed a bit in the recipe so that the drug therefore become lawful. See also designer drugs. Following a decision by a prosecutor, the police may destroy the seized. The reason for this change in the law are a number of deaths due to ingestion of unclassified synthetic drugs, often sold in online stores.

The last decade, the treatment of drug addicts with Methadone and Subutex and the number of people in the syringe exchange programs increased significantly. The number of clinics that provide treatment with Methadone or Subutex has increased from one clinic to 110 clinics. The downside of this development is much less control over who gets those drugs and how much. An increasing number of drug-related deaths can be linked to over-consumed prescribed drugs. This has led to claims that the number of doctors who can prescribe such drugs must be strictly limited to a minor number of specialist.

== Implementation ==
Since 1993, the police have had the legal right to take action against people they suspect of being under the influence of drugs even if they are not disturbing anyone. Many Swedish police officers have, since 1993, received training in how to recognize the signs and symptoms of being under the influence of drugs.

In such cases, the suspect may have to produce a blood or urine sample for analysis. About 27,500 drug use verification tests and 10,000 drugged driving and drug use tests (two separate offences) were carried out in 2006. If the sample contains drugs or traces of drugs, the person is guilty of a personal use minor drug offence. One of the justifications for this legislation was to make it possible to find and apprehend people to offer care and treatment at as early a stage as possible. The police have an obligation to inform the social services of all cases of drug use that come to their attention.

The penalty for drug offences depends upon the seriousness of the offence. For minor drug offences, the court may impose a fine or prison sentence of up to six months. More serious offences always carry a prison sentence, usually up to a maximum of three years. If the offence is considered particularly serious, the sentence will be anything from a minimum of two to a maximum of ten years. In 2005, there were 18,818 total prosecutions. Of these, 73% were for minor drug offences, 25% for drugs offences (give often some months to a some years in prison), and 2% for serious drug offences (give normally several years in prison).

In recent years, drug testing of suspected abusers has been used as a first step in motivating them to seek treatment. Conditional sentences for drug offenses includes such measures as mandatory urine tests or treatment. The anti-drug program also includes information and low cost treatment for any citizen with an addiction to drugs.

Treatment for drug dependency in various parts of The Prison, Probation and Rehabilitation Authority (Kriminalvården') is described in The Acton plan of 2006 as a very important part of the Drug Policy of Sweden. Contract treatment instead of prison is primarily used for recurrent drug addicts where there is a clear link between a crime and the addiction. Instead of serving a prison sentence of up to two years, the convicted person signs a contract with the court to undergo a treatment programme (at an institution or at home), to partake in non-custodial care, or both. 1,439 persons were sentenced to contract treatment in 2006.

Almost every municipality has its own local anti-drug coordinator to provide a broad drug preventive work directed at youths, in cooperation with politicians, police, church, educational associations and societies. Sweden has a number of non-governmental anti-drug organizations as well.

== Imprisonment for drug crimes ==
In 2004, Sweden had 84 people per 100,000 in either prison or remand prison. This is less than the average for the OECD (132 people per 100,000) and much less than the number for the United States (725 per 100,000). The average number of prisoners per day is 4700. Minor drug related offences, such as personal use of illegal drugs, provides only a fine but will result in a police record. If the penalty was only fines the police erase the record after five years. Some employers and others can demand an extract from police records e.g. before employment.

In 2008, 23% of those imprisoned were primarily convicted for drug crimes or goods trafficking. A majority of the prisoners suffer from drug addiction before they come to the prison, but random drug tests of the prisoners show a low and decreasing number (less than 2%) of ongoing drug use inside the Swedish prisons. This has helped to create a more calm situation, especially in high security prisons. Regular urine and sweat test are performed, dogs trained to find drugs are also used and more strict control of visitors. In addition to traditional methods, e.g. education and social rehabilitation, a large range of national treatment programmes are offered.

== Number of drug-related deaths ==
The EMCDDA figures for "Drug-induced mortality rates among adults (15–64)" show a rate of 3.09 cases per 100,000 population for Sweden in 2006, rising steadily to 6.97 per 100,000 in 2013, worsening from the ninth to the second highest rate of any country in Europe. By comparison the figures for the U.K. were 4.38 (2006) to 4.46 (2013), and for the Netherlands less than 1.0 per 100,000 population. The Swedish National Board of Health and Welfare believes that the reported increase very largely is result of improved, more sophisticated methods to detect drug-related deaths and more analyzes of blood than before. It can not be excluded that there also has been a real increase in the number of drug-related deaths.

According to the EMCDDA standard definition that only counts deaths directly related to drug consumption, there were 157 drug-related deaths recorded in 2006, of a total Swedish population of 9.2 million (1.7 people per 100,000). Morphine (including Heroin), methadone and amphetamines cause most of the registered drug-related deaths in Sweden. In the same year, the number of drug-related recorded deaths in the Netherlands amounted to 112, of a total population of 16.5 million (0.68 people per 100,000). The reported drug-related death rate in U.S. was 12.6 per 100,000, the reported drug-related death rate in the U.K. was 39.8 per 100,000.

In Sweden, drug-related deaths is counted in three ways. One is according to the EMCDDA definition for international comparisons presented above, but a general weakness of the EMCDDA's statistics is that many drug-related deaths are treated as death of natural causes even though the deaths are due to a disease that typically comes after a long period of substance abuse or due to an accident under influence of drugs. The other two take that in account and find usage in national comparisons over time. The longest series of statistics is from the register on Causes of Death, it includes cases where drug-related diagnoses is noted on the death certificate both as direct and underlying cause. There is also a line of statistics for which all cases where illicit drugs are detected in the blood of the deceased is registered, the so-called Toxbase. Using the definition for Toxbase, 292 cases where drug-related in 2006. With the definition for the register of causes of death, 242 cases were drug-related in 2006.

In 2018 it was reported that there was "alarmingly high rates of hepatitis C among people who inject drugs" and that there had been a "600% increase in drug-induced deaths over the last 20 years" in Sweden.

== Drugs and driving ==
The Swedish traffic police have a zero tolerance policy for driving influenced by drugs. Annually about 2.5 million random tests are performed for alcohol and about 12 thousand tests on suspicion of drugs. The limit for alcohol is the same as in most European countries, zero point two promilles (0.02 milligram per 100 milligram of blood). Sweden has among the lowest mortality rate in the world in road traffic, with 2.0 fatalities/100,000 population This however doesn't affect the ones with a prescription for an illegal drug like amphetamine such as Ritalin, Concerta, and Elvanse, unless stated which is the case with most dissociatives and other drugs which can seriously affect driving like opioids.

== Health care for drug abusers ==
All Swedish citizens have the right to health care at a health clinic owned by the County Council or, in the case of a medical emergency, at hospital owned by the County Council. Most Swedes have therefore no private health insurance. A medical consultation will cost between US$14 and $50 including the cost of various laboratory tests. For professionals in health care any information about a patient's drug abuse is confidential by law unless the patient is suspected of a crime that could result in at least two years imprisonment or of driving under the influence of drugs.

A person who has developed a drug addiction can apply to the local social welfare board in his home community to become admitted to a treatment center for drug addicts in another part of the country. If the application is approved, the social welfare board pay the treatment including all cost for staying at the treatment center for several months. The social welfare board is financed by local taxes. This type of treatment is expensive (but less expensive than a long imprisonment for crimes) so only a few thousands of applications are approved per year.

== Cannabis in health care ==
Treatment with drugs that are extracts or synthetic variants of cannabis are not legal to use in health care with one small exception. Nabiximols, trade name Sativex, a cannabinoid oromucosal mouth spray, was approved in December 2011, for multiple sclerosis (MS); only on prescription as a third alternative to two other approved drugs for that condition to patients who not responded adequately to other medication for spasticity and show a clinically relevant improvement of symptoms related to spasticity during an initial trial treatment.

Of the approximately 13,000 people in Sweden been diagnosed with multiple sclerosis (MS), about 50 of them used Sativex in December 2011. The Pharmacy Company that sells Sativex state that the risk for drug dependence is lower for Sativex than the morphine based alternatives because the dose of THC so low that the patients cannot be "high" on it. Sweden has a policy for imposing harsher than average prison sentences on people who use cannabis for medicinal purposes.

== Drug testing ==
It is common for medium and large companies to have a zero tolerance policy for illegal drugs and demand a drug test for new employees. Those companies often also demand the same for subcontractors and consultants that visit them. Random drug tests among all employees has also become more common.

== Hemp ==
Hemp is in Sweden a very small crop, grown on about 250 ha. To be legal one must own at least four hectares of agricultural land and register the cultivation by applying for so-called "farm aid" under EU rules on agricultural subsidies and also use approved seeds. Only hemp with less than 0.2% THC is allowed.

== Criticism ==
An often repeated criticism is that a decline in resources for treatment of drug addicts started in the 1990s. If the person has not been convicted for a serious crime so must that person's home municipality pay a large part of treatment for drug addiction. The same committee in the municipality is also responsible for supporting other groups like old, the disabled, refugees, long-term unemployed and others within a limited budget. These other groups often have the support of relatives or strong local associations that speak for them against the municipality. Relatives of drug addicts do not have the same strong position. Information on a drug addict age 18 or older are covered by confidentiality. This confidentiality also applies to near relatives. Relatives of addicts has not, in practice, the same legal possibility, as some other groups, to appeal against the lack of care to any court. All these factors together end in that only a small proportion of drug abusers get more intensive treatment for their drug addiction or that treatment begins only after the abuse has become very serious.

=== Alcohol policy ===
Despite Sweden having a zero-tolerance policy, Sweden's state-run liquor monopoly, Systembolaget, defines "alcohol-free" as a beverage that contains no more than 0.5% alcohol by volume, and more than half of the "alcohol-free" beverages there actually contain a small amount of alcohol. Some people say that these labels are misleading and are a threat to recovering alcoholics.

== See also ==
- Cannabis in Sweden
- Nils Bejerot (1921–1988), sometimes referred to as the founding father of Swedish drug control policy
- Federation of alcohol and drug awareness, CAN, Stockholm Swedish web site partly financed by tax money and partly by a large number of anti-drug and anti-alcohol organizations
- Swedish Drug Users Union
