= Spannabis =

Cannabis commercial fair in Spain

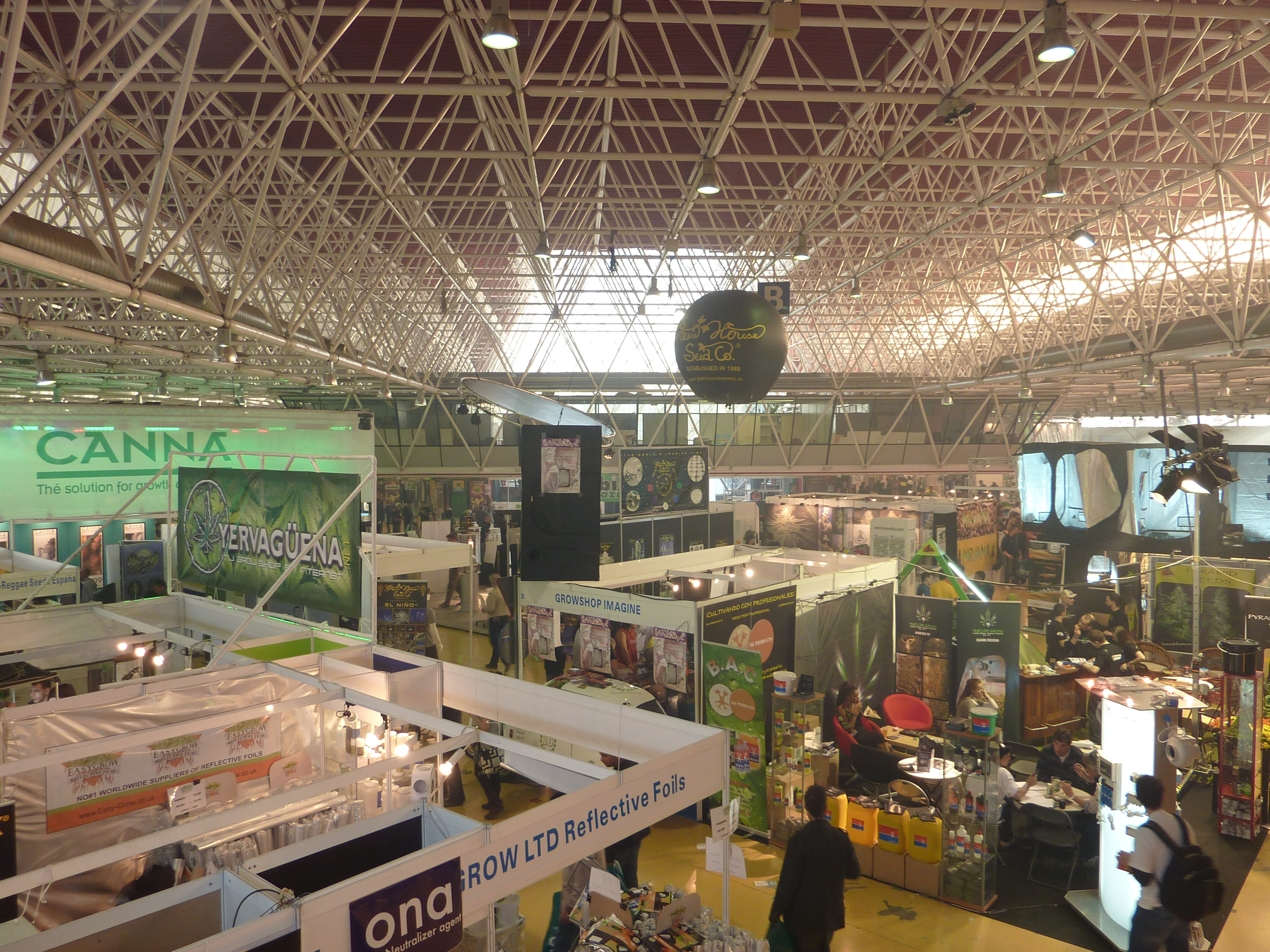
- Status: Active
- Frequency: Annually
- Location: Barcelona
- Country: Spain
- Years active: 24

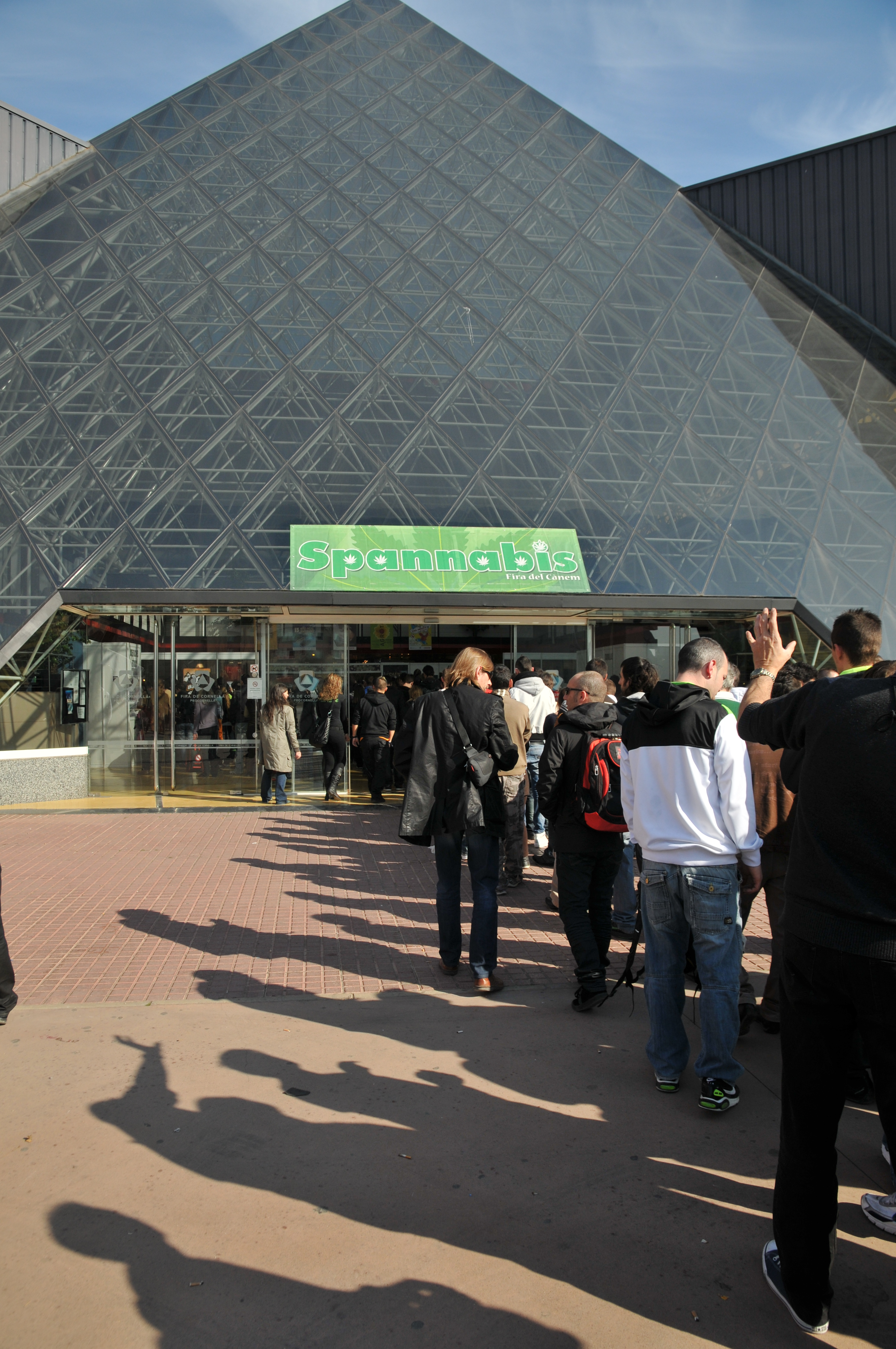
Entrance to Spannabis

Spannabis is a commercial trade fair decidated to cannabis and related activities, held in Spain since 2002.

The fair includes among its topics: industrial hemp, seeds, farming systems, and aspects related to recreational or medical uses. In addition, lectures are given during the conference to discuss topics such as its use in herbal medicine, research on its active ingredients, cultivation and consumption, and risk reduction.

== History ==
In 2002, the first Spannabis was held at the Palau Sant Jordi in Barcelona, Spain. The second edition of Spannabis was held at the Fira de Cornellá, where it has been held up to 2025.

In 2011, Italian politicians protested against the celebration of Spannabis and requested explanations from the then Spanish Prime Minister, José Luis Rodríguez Zapatero.

The fair grew subsantially over the years, reaching 18,000 m^{2} and 30,000 attendees in 2017, with hundreds of companies represented.

In recent years, the fair has organised a series of talks, named "World Cannabis Conferences".

== See also ==
- Cannabis in Spain
