= Cáñamo =

Spanish cannabis magazine

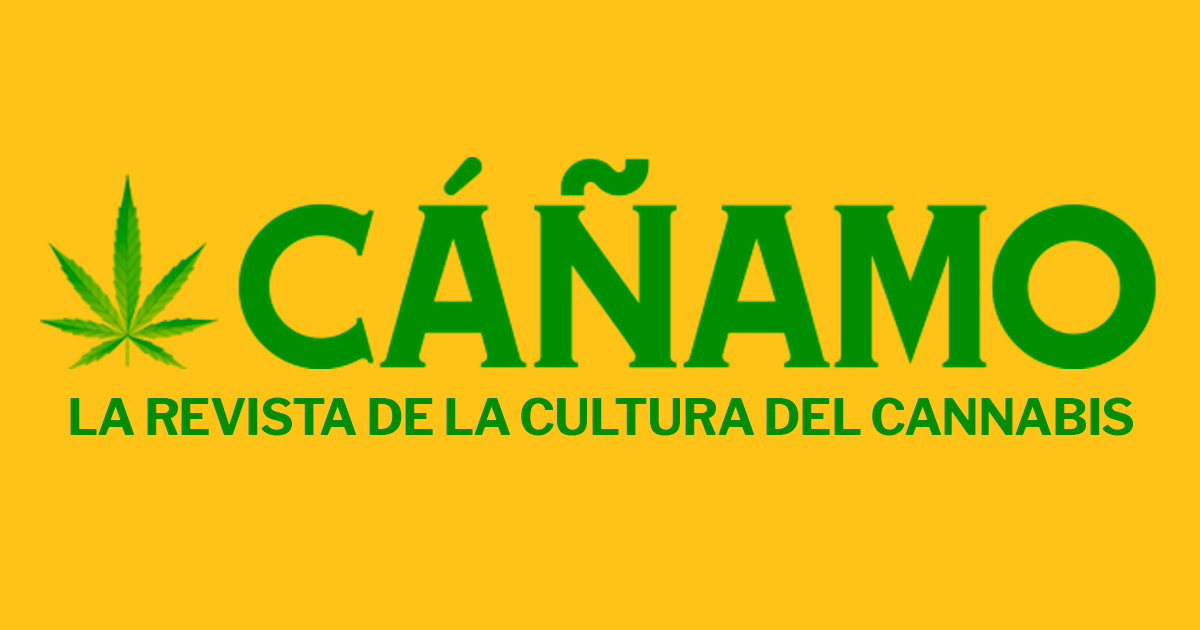
- Director: Fidel Moreno
- Categories: cannabis culture
- Frequency: monthly
- Format: print and online
- Founded: 1997
- First issue: 21 June 1997
- Company: La Cañamería Global SL.
- Country: Chile, Colombia, Mexico and Spain
- Language: Spanish
- Website: Canamo.net
- ISSN: 2486-6512

Cáñamo magazine is an international monthly publication, considered the first dedicated to cannabis culture in the Spanish-speaking world, as well as the oldest and most active. It was founded in Spain in 1997, extending in 2005 to Chile, in 2015 to Mexico and in 2017 to Colombia. It is produced by La Cañamería Global, SL.

It owns the online bookstore, Oniria Bookstore, considered the only bookstore specialized in literature on psychoactive substances.

== History ==
Cáñamo was founded in Barcelona in 1997 by Gaspar Fraga, Jaime Prats and Moisés López. It was Gaspar who convinced Jaime and Moisés, who were members of the Ramón Santos Association for the Study of Cannabis (ARSEC), to found a magazine on cannabis information, instead of a commercial company. According to Prats and López, Cáñamo distances itself from the commercial trend of most cannabis magazines, in favor of a more informative approach.

In 2004, the Portuguese version Cânhamo was started in Portugal, which, however, had to be closed shortly after due to the application of the anti-drug law. It had a print run of six issues.

It has a circulation of 21 thousand copies (Spain, 2014).

== Content ==
In its publications, Cáñamo offers varied content on this plant. Its purpose is research around cannabis, both its biology and its history and its relationship with humans. Likewise, the magazine is dedicated to demolishing myths about cannabis, defending the right to information and knowledge, and fighting against censorship. Its creators have pointed out on multiple occasions that "Cáñamo has never encouraged the use of cannabis."
