= Metzineres =

Spanish cooperative for vulnerable women

Coordinates: 41°38′08″N 2°16′40″E

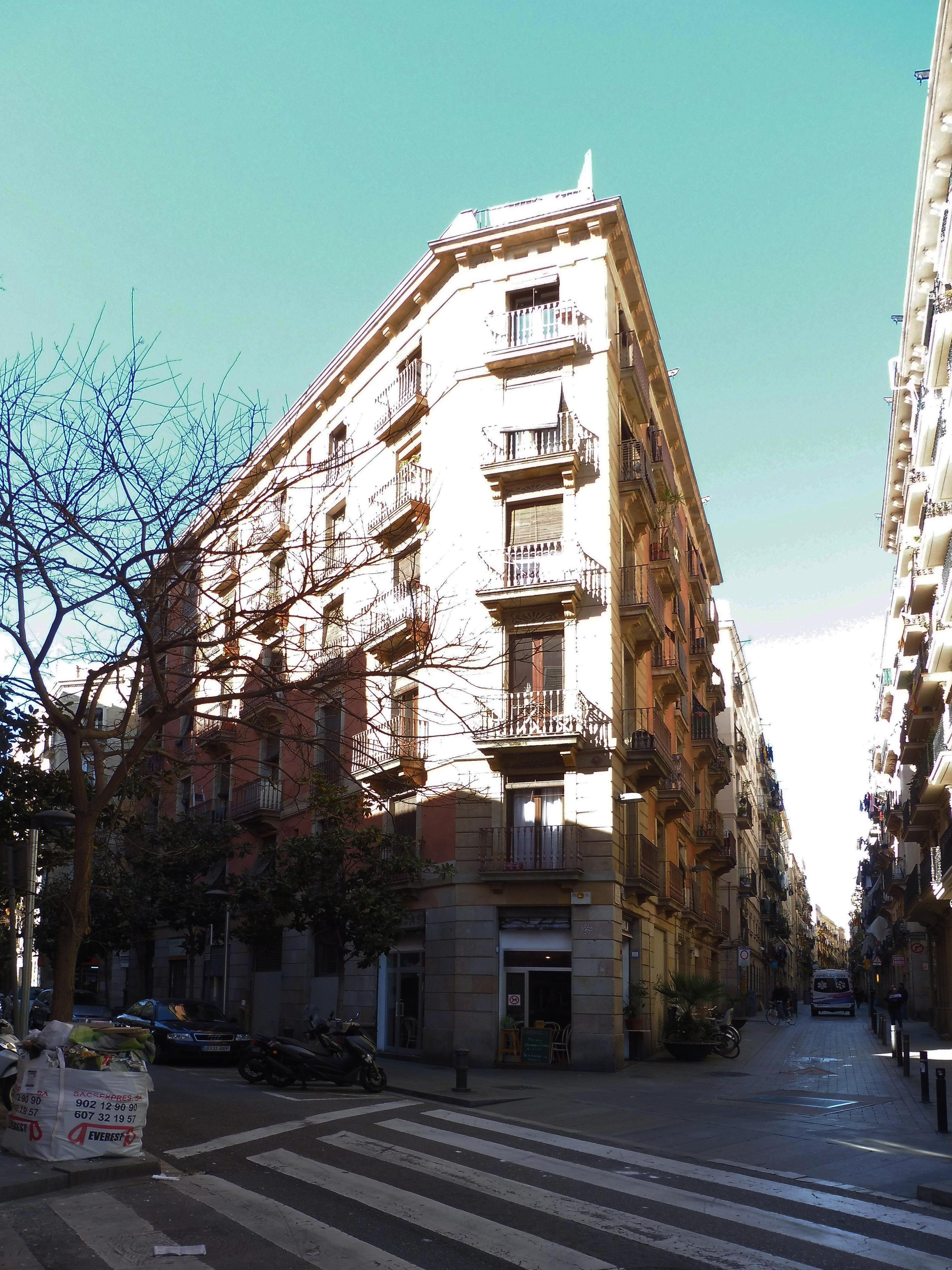
Carrer de la Lluna, in the neighborhood of El Raval in Barcelona, where Metzineres is located

Metzineres (in full "Metzineres - Environments of shelter for womxn who take drugs surviving violences") is a nonprofit cooperative based in Barcelona, Spain, providing shelter for vulnerable and marginalized women and non-binary people who use drugs, including homeless people. The project was launched in 2017 and registered as a non-profit cooperative in October 2020.

== Services and activities ==
Beyond essential health and harm reduction services, Metzineres includes services of cover basic needs such as shower, access to internet, hot meals, spaces for peer-support, modalities to engage with neighborhood communities, help to entrepreneurship, art and cultural activities, webradio, as well as a needle and syringe programme and a supervised injection site. Metzineres also engage in advocacy such as demands for heroin-assisted treatment.

Because of barriers to access to healthcare and institutional gaps, marginalized women and non-binary persons who use illicit drugs may not access the health or social services to which they are entitled. For this reason, some believe that "the Metzineres initiative [...] represents a promising model for how harm-reduction programs can provide essential services and support to women and gender non-conforming drug users who have survived situations of violence."

During the COVID-19 pandemic in Spain, Metzineres was recognized as an essential health service by health authorities, and integrated as a special intervention service in the healthcare plan of the Catalan government.

Metzineres also participates in harm reduction conferences, international fora such as the United Nations Commission on Narcotic Drugs and High-level meeting on HIV/AIDS, and activist groups such as the International Network of People who Use Drugs or International Drug Policy Consortium.

== Name ==
The word "metzinera" (plural: "metzineres") is an ancient catalan term, historically used to denigrate women accused of witchcraft, in particular for their use of herbal remedies. According to FilterMag, "the 'x' in the word womxn intentionally signifies a commitment to engage cis, trans and non-binary community members."

== See also ==
- Harm reduction
- Feminism
- Supervised injection site
- Needle and syringe programmes
- International Network of People who Use Drugs
- International Center for Ethnobotanical Education, Research and Service
- Tre Borràs Cabacés
