= INPUD =

International non-profit organization

International Network for People who Use Drugs (INPUD)
- Founded: March 2006
- Legal status: Non-profit organization
- Purpose: Drug users rights, Drug policy reform, Drug policy.
- Origins: 17th International Conference on the Reduction of Drug Related Harm, Vancouver, 30 May–4 April 2006
- Region served: Worldwide
- Executive director: Anton Basenko
- Main organ: Board
- Website: inpud.net

INPUD (International Network for People who Use Drugs) is an international non-profit organization grouping local groups and collectives of people who use illicit drugs, which aims at "A world where people who use drugs are free to live their lives with dignity." INPUD was founded in 2006 in Vancouver, Canada, and formally launched in Copenhagen, Denmark, on 1 November 2008.

== History ==
Although drug users' activist groups have existed all across the world for decades, the inception of an international network of people who use drugs traces back to Canada. On the one hand, in practice, in British Columbia, the leadership of local users groups such as VANDU inspired the creation of a broader network. According to Kerr et al, "in 1997 a group of Vancouver residents, including drug users, activists, and others, came together to form a drug user organization as a means to addressing the health crisis among local injecting drug users" and called it the Vancouver Area Network of Drug Users (VANDU) Following the launch of this local organization, a series of meetings and gathering were set up. On the other hand, in theory, NGOs such as the Canadian HIV/AIDS Legal Network had prepared background documents such as the report Nothing About Us Without Us (Greater, Meaningful Involvement of People Who Use Illegal Drugs: A Public Health, Ethical, and Human Rights Imperative) which emphasized that measures of harm reduction related to drug use should happen "from the ground up, with people who use drugs involved in every part of the process".

Between 30 May and 4 April 2006, the 17th International Conference on the Reduction of Drug Related Harm was held in Vancouver. Over 1300 attendees from more than 60 countries reportedly attended. One of the highlighted outcome was the adoption, on the first day of the conference, of the Vancouver Declaration, subtitled "Why the world needs an international network of activists who use drugs." It served as the starting point to the development of an international network and, subsequently, regional and local groupings. The Vancouver Declaration "highlights the history of marginalization and discrimination against people who use drugs and promotes the right to self-representation and empowerment".

The NGO was formally created as a Belgian non-profit organization, and launched on 1 November 2008. INPUD also declared the first of November an International Drug Users Day.

== Purpose and activities ==
INPUD considers itself "a global peer-based organization that seeks to promote the health and defend the rights of people who use drugs". On its website, the organization is described as follows:

INPUD is a global network of people who use and have used drugs. INPUD has an evolving regional network structure and also strong ties with a number of national and local drug user organisations. A key role of the organisation is to support people who use drugs to access and take part in international policy processes.

At its launch, INPUD declared the following five aims:

1. To advocate and lobby for the rights of drug users on the world stage,
2. To bring the voices of drug users to the policy table,
3. To support and seed the development of self-determining networks of drug users that advocate for the rights of drug users,
4. To promote and advocate for harm reduction as a means of supporting safer drug use,
5. To build alliances with like-minded organizations in the drugs field and civil society to further the first four aims of INPUD.

In its 2021-2024 plan, INPUD declared as a "vision": "A world where people who use drugs are free to live their lives with dignity."

More generally, the goals and purposes of INPUD are laid down in the Vancouver Declaration. After its launch, in 2007, INPUD conducted "a six-month on-line research on the profile of drug users' (DU) activism and self-organisation." The study gathered information about the types of the drug users' organizations world-wide, the level of involvement of drug users communities in activism, geographical coverage, goals, funding sources, etc. The study was then used to foster capacity-building into local organizations of people who use drugs.

In 2015, INPUD held consultations in Dar es Salaam, Bangkok, London, Tbilisi, and virtually, with representatives of 24 drug users groups originating from 28 countries. This resulted in the adoption of the Consensus Statement on Drug Use Under Prohibition, a manifesto which focusses on human rights, health, and the law in relation to people who use drugs, from the perspective of people who use drugs themselves. As explained on the organization's website, "This is a statement of essential demands. These demands must be met if the harms experienced by people who use drugs are to be ended." The Consensus Statement reinforces the Vancouver Declaration and specifies the goals of INPUD and its local groups.

INPUD and its local chapters have increasingly been involved as observers and participant in United Nations conferences on drugs and health-related issues. In 2017, INPUD collaborated with the UN Office on Drugs and Crime, World Health Organization, Joint UN Programme on HIV/AIDS, UN Population Fund and UN Development Programme to publish a guide titled Implementing Comprehensive HIV and HCV Programmes with People Who Inject Drugs: Practical Guidance for Collaborative Interventions.

=== Regional organisations ===
One of the goals of INPUD is "developing and supporting regional and national drug user networks and emerging leaders through technical support"

Accordingly, INPUD is subdivided into seven regional or topical groupings themselves gathering local groups. Regional or topical INPUD members are organized as their own networks of people who use drugs, with the same aims and objectives as INPUD's. It receives funding from the Robert Carr Fund to develop the consortium of networks.

As of July 2022, there are six regional groups plus one topical group (INWUD).

==== International Network of Women who Use Drugs (INWUD) ====
Founded in 2010, INWUD is the global network of women who use drugs. It has been shedding light on gender-specific issues like sexual and reproductive health, or gender-specific repression of women who use drugs (such as forced abortion or sterilization) as well as issues of stigma.

==== African Network of People who Use Drugs (AfricaNPUD) ====
AfricaNPUD is a network founded in 2015 by and for African people who use drugs, and headquartered in Kenya. It is currently present across 15 countries in the African region. AfricaNPUD accepts membership from both individual members and community-led organizations.

==== Network of Asian People who use Drugs (NAPUD) ====
NAPUD (previously known as ANPUD) is headquartered in Thailand.

==== Eurasian Network of People who Use Drugs (ENPUD) ====
ENPUD is focused on the Eastern Europe and Centra Asia (EECA) region. During the Russo-Ukrainian War, the network has been engaged in providing emergency assistance and treatment for people who use drugs.

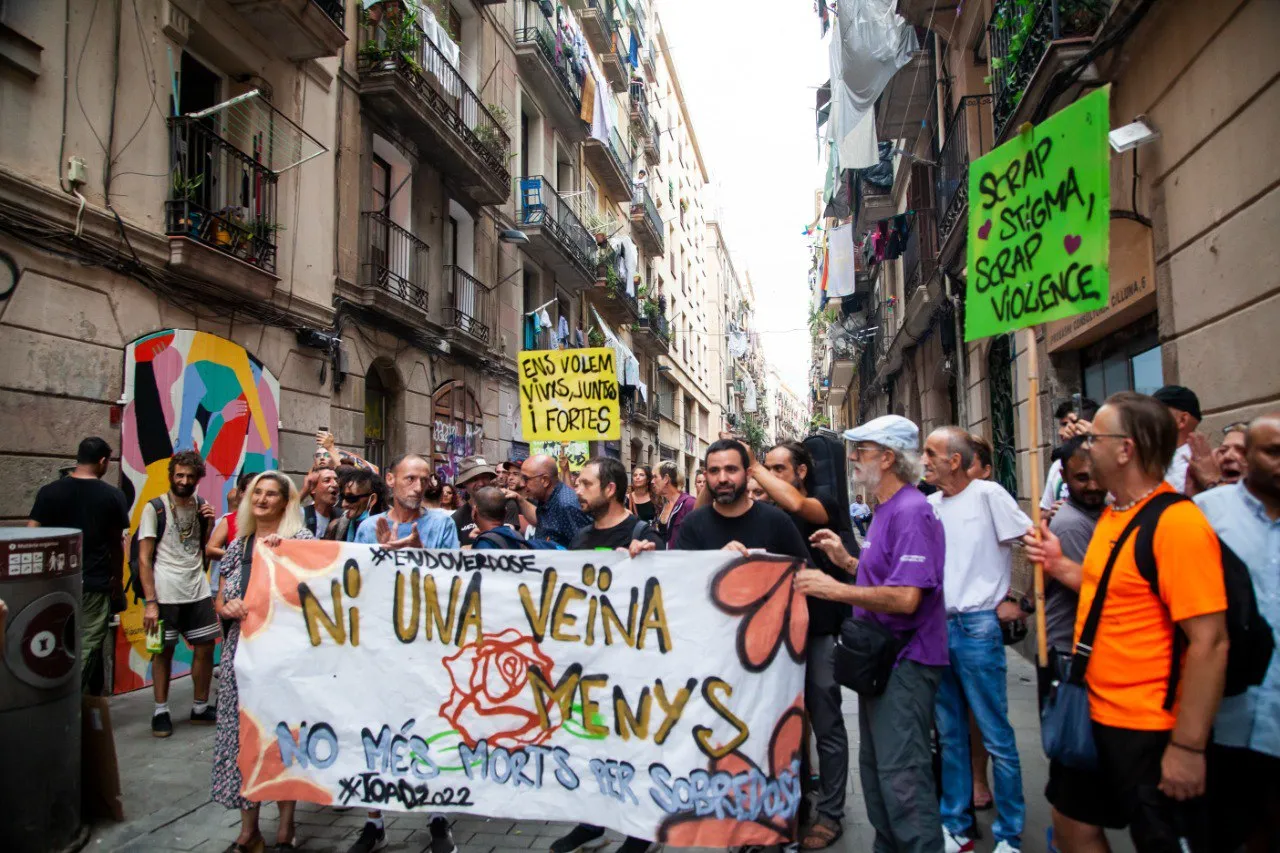
A demonstration by CATNPUD and Metzineres in Barcelona for International Overdose Awareness Day in 2022

==== European Network of People who Use Drugs (EuroNPUD) ====
Founded 2011, EuroNPUD is present across the European Union and neighboring countries (UK, Switzerland, Norway). EuroNPUD claims presence in 12 European countries via local unions and groups of people who use drugs (Swedish Drug Users Union, CATNPUD and Metzineres in Catalonia, ASUD in France, etc.).

==== Latin American Network of People who Use Drugs (LANPUD) ====
Focused on Latin America and the Caribbean regions, it was launched on 26 October 2012 in Salvador de Bahia, Brasil. As of July 2022, LANPUD claims presence in 17 countries.

==== Middle East and North Africa Network of People who Use Drugs (MENANPUD) ====
MENANPUD is present in the Middle East and North Africa (MENA) region.

=== Leadership ===
As of August 2025, the Secretariat is formed by:

- Anton Basenko (Executive Director since 2025),
- Olga Szubert (Deputy Director since 2025, Programme Oversight since 2022),
- Tina Chkhaidze (Finance Manager since 2018),
- Chantelle Gribenhouw (Office Manager since 2022),
- Annie Madden (UNITAID CUTTS Project Lead, since 2022),
- Aditia Taslim (Advocacy Lead, since 2021),
- Lana Durjava (Communication Officer, since 2024)
- Isaac Ogunkola (Global Fund Programme Manager, since 2024)

INPUD's Board of Directors

Louise Beale Vincent, United States (Vice Chair) Representative of the North American Network of People who Use Drugs (NANPUD)

Hassan Turaif, Bahrain (Treasurer) Representative of the Middle East and North African Network of People who Use Drugs (MENANPUD)

Happy Assan, Tanzania Representative of the International Network of Women who Use Drugs (INWUD)

Ernesto Cortes, Costa Rica Representative of the Latin American Network of People who Use Drugs (LANPUD)

Jane Marie Dicka, Australia Representative of the Pacific Network of People who Use Drugs (PANPUD)

John Melhus, Norway Representative of the European Network of People who Use Drugs (EuroNPUD)

Johann P Nadela, Philippines Representative of the Network of Asian People who Use Drugs (NAPUD)

Kassim Nyuni, Zanzibar Representative of the African Network of People who Use Drugs (AfricaNPUD)

== See also ==
- Cannabis rights
- Drugs
- Drug liberalization
- Drug policy
- Harm reduction
- NGO
- Psilocybin decriminalization in the United States
- UNODC
- UNAIDS
- WHO
