= International Drug Policy Consortium =

Global drug policy reform network

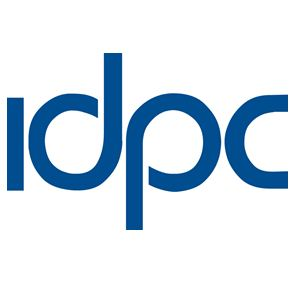
- Founded: 2006; 20 years ago
- Type: Non-profit NGO
- Purpose: Drug policy
- Region served: Worldwide
- Product: Drug policy reform network
- Key people: Jamie Bridge (Executive Director); Marie Nougier (Deputy Director); Tomas Chang Pico (Chair of the Board)
- Website: idpc.net

The International Drug Policy Consortium (IDPC) is a global network of more than 200 NGOs. IDPC's vision is "Drug policies that advance social justice and human rights." The IDPC secretariat has offices in London (UK), Amsterdam (Netherlands), Accra (Ghana), and Bangkok (Thailand).

IDPC's advocacy positions are based on five core policy principles. These principles are that drug policies should:

1. Be developed through an objective assessment of priorities and evidence.
2. Comply with national, regional and international human rights principles, laws and standards.
3. Focus on reducing the harmful consequences, rather than the scale, of drug use and markets.
4. Promote social justice and the inclusion of marginalised groups, rather than focus on punitive measures towards them.
5. Be developed and implemented based on open and constructive relationships with civil society and affected populations.

== History ==
IDPC was formed in 2006, following a "Global Drug Policy Seminar" at the House of Lords in November 2005 hosted by the Beckley Foundation. At this meeting, participants including NGOs and academics identified the need for "a credible, global NGO network that would engage constructively with governments by providing policy-makers with a ‘critical friend’ analysis, and realistic proposals of how dilemmas in drug policy and programme formulation could be resolved".

In January 2011, IDPC was formally registered as a legal entity in the United Kingdom. In 2019, a separate entity was also registered a Stichting (“Foundation”) in the Netherlands and designated as an "Algemeen Nut Beogende Instelling” or ANBI (translation: public benefit organization). In 2014, IDPC was granted Special Consultative Status by the UN Economic and Social Council (ECOSOC).

In 2026, IDPC commemorated its 20th anniversary, and was also designated as an undesirable organization in Russia.

== Members ==
As of August 2026, the IDPC network comprised 209 member organisations from 75 countries, which include NGOs, academic institutions, think tanks, networks and community-led organisations engaged in drug policy advocacy – located in every region of the world.

== Activities ==
Examples of IDPC's work includes:

- Organisation of capacity building workshops.
- Direct engagement in policy making processes around drug control at the international and United Nations levels and frequent attendance at meetings of the Commission on Narcotic Drugs and the Human Rights Council, among others.
- Providing the CND Blog and CND App to help people follow and engage with meetings of the Commission on Narcotic Drugs.
- Publishing hundreds of reports, advocacy tools and thematic briefings.
- The Drug Decriminalisation [e]Course, an open access online course on all aspects of decriminalisation for people who use drugs.
- A global advocacy campaign called Support. Don't Punish. The campaign has run since 2013 and calls for better drug policies that prioritise public health and human rights. It encourages grass-root participation in advocating for better drug policy, culminating in a Global Day of Action on 26 June each year, which is also the UN's official International Day Against Drug Abuse and Illicit Trafficking. The campaign is organized worldwide with local activities such as rallies, street art, concerts, petitions, sports events, seminars and film screenings.
