= International Center for Ethnobotanical Education, Research and Service =

Spanish non-profit organization

ICEERS
- Founded: 2009
- Founder: Benjamin De Loenen
- Legal status: Non-profit organization
- Purpose: Research and policy issues related to psychoactive plants and traditional medicines
- Location: Barcelona, Spain
- Region served: Worldwide
- Website: www.iceers.org/en/

The International Center for Ethnobotanical Education, Research, and Service (ICEERS) is a non-profit organization based in Barcelona, Spain, founded in 2009.

Its activities address the social, legal, cultural, and health-related dimensions of traditional medicines such as ayahuasca and iboga. The globalization of such practices has generated debates in fields including drug policy, public health, and the protection of Indigenous knowledge. ICEERS has consultative status with the United Nations' ECOSOC.

== History ==
ICEERS was founded in 2009 by Benjamin De Loenen as the International Center for Ethnobotanical Education, Research, and Service. Its work initially focused on issues related to ayahuasca, iboga, and other psychoactive plants used in traditional contexts. Over time, the organization expanded its activities to include research, public education, harm reduction, and participation in policy discussions.

== Projects and activities ==
ICEERS has been involved in initiatives related to legal support, harm reduction, education, conferences, and research on psychoactive plants and traditional medicines, including legal support services, international conferences, and research projects.

=== Legal support ===
ICEERS provides legal support related to ayahuasca and other traditional Indigenous medicines. This work includes legal information, documentation, and assistance in selected legal cases.

In 2016 the organization launched the Ayahuasca Defense Fund (ADF), now presented as the legal support service of ICEERS for cases involving ayahuasca and other traditional Indigenous medicines. According to ICEERS reports, by 2019 the program had supported more than 100 cases in 27 countries. Later updates from the organization indicate that the program has supported more than 390 people in 47 countries.

ICEERS has collaborated with the Union of Indigenous Yagé Doctors of the Colombian Amazon (UMIYAC), an Indigenous organization that works to preserve traditional medicine practices and cultural heritage in the Colombian Amazon.

=== Harm reduction services ===
ICEERS provides harm reduction services for individuals seeking information or assistance after difficult experiences related to psychoactive plants or other non-ordinary states of consciousness. The service offers informational materials, orientation, and referrals related to safety and integration following challenging experiences.

=== Cannabmed ===
ICEERS previously organized the Cannabmed conferences on medical cannabis in 2016, 2018 and 2020. These events brought together patients, healthcare professionals and researchers to discuss medical cannabis and related policy issues.

Participants in the conferences included patient organizations and professional groups involved in discussions on medical cannabis regulation, including the Patients Union for Cannabis Regulation and the Endocannabinology Clinical Society.

The conferences were held at the Autonomous University of Barcelona, the College of Physicians of Barcelona, and the College of Pharmacists of Barcelona.

Researchers associated with ICEERS have contributed to academic publications on Cannabis Social Clubs in Spain and Europe.

=== PsychēPlants ===
In 2017, ICEERS received funding from the European Commission for a project called PsychēPlants, which produced reports and informational resources on psychoactive plants, fungi and animal secretions.

=== World Ayahuasca Conference ===
The first World Ayahuasca Conference was held in Ibiza, Spain, in 2014, and the second in Rio Branco, Brazil, in 2016. The third edition took place in Girona, Spain, from May 31 to June 2, 2019.

The conferences brought together researchers, Indigenous representatives, policymakers and practitioners to discuss the globalization of ayahuasca practices and related cultural, legal and public health issues.

=== Iboga/ine Community Engagement Initiative ===
ICEERS developed the Iboga/ine Community Engagement Initiative, a project aimed at gathering perspectives from stakeholders on the social, cultural, and policy implications of iboga and ibogaine.

=== Biocultural conservation ===
ICEERS has participated in projects related to the conservation of psychoactive plants and associated Indigenous knowledge systems, in collaboration with Indigenous organizations and philanthropic foundations.

=== International activities ===
ICEERS has participated in international discussions on drug policy, human rights, and traditional Indigenous medicines, including processes linked to United Nations bodies.

In correspondence cited in submissions to the Office of the High Commissioner for Human Rights, the International Narcotics Control Board (INCB) stated that plants containing DMT, including ayahuasca, are not under international control as plants or preparations.

=== Research ===
ICEERS conducts research on the health, cultural, and social dimensions of psychoactive plants and traditional medicines.

Research conducted by ICEERS has examined substances such as cannabis, ayahuasca, and ibogaine, as well as the role of traditional medicine practices in public health and Global Mental Health.

Studies associated with the organization have used multidisciplinary approaches combining biomedical research and ethnographic methods.

ICEERS, in collaboration with other institutions, published the Ayahuasca Technical Report, as well as studies on the neuropsychological and mental health effects of ayahuasca and other psychoactive substances.

Research associated with ICEERS has involved collaborations with academic institutions including the University of São Paulo, the Rovira i Virgili University, and the Autonomous University of Madrid.

The organization has also participated in research initiatives exploring the potential therapeutic use of ibogaine in the treatment of opioid dependence.

== See also ==
- Ethnobotany
- Drug policy
- Ayahuasca
- Ibogaine
