= Cannabis in Australia =

- Location of Australia (dark green)
- Medicinal: Legal
- Recreational: Illegal federally Decriminalised in South Australia and the Northern Territory; Legal in the Australian Capital Territory
- Hemp: Legal

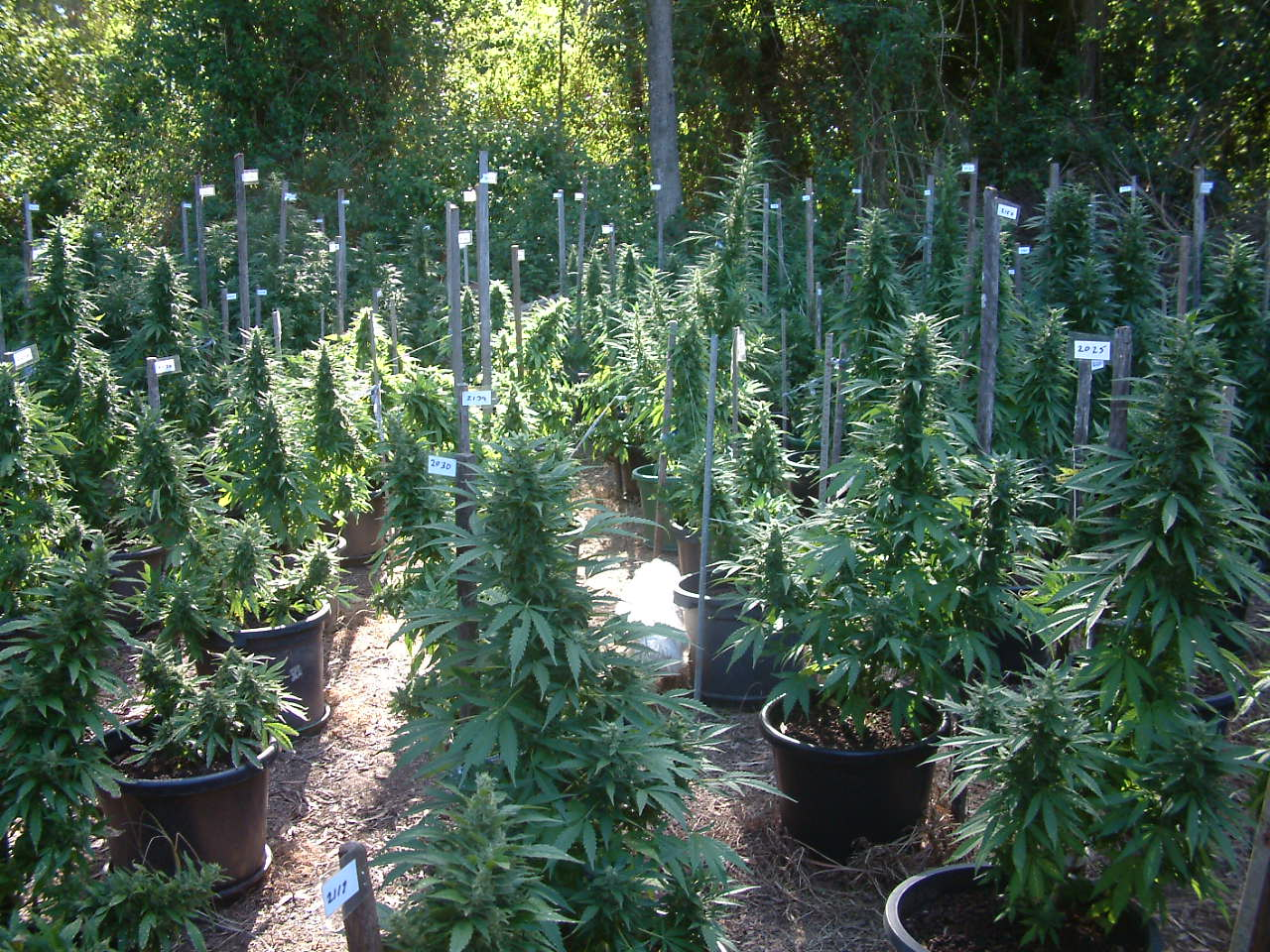
A medical cannabis crop in Australia

Cannabis is a plant used in Australia for recreational, medicinal and industrial purposes. Australia has one of the highest cannabis prevalence rates in the world. In 2022–23, 41% of Australians over the age of fourteen years had used cannabis in their lifetime and 11.5% had used cannabis in the last 12 months.

On 24 February 2016, Australia legalised growing of cannabis for medicinal and scientific purposes at the federal level. On 12 November 2017, Food Standards Australia New Zealand (FSANZ) made low-THC hemp food legal for human consumption in Australia. On 25 September 2019, the Australian Capital Territory passed a bill allowing for possession and growth of small amounts of cannabis for personal use as of 31 January 2020, although the laws conflict with federal laws that prohibit recreational use of cannabis and the supply of cannabis and cannabis seeds are not allowed under the changes.

Attitudes towards legalising recreational cannabis in Australia have shifted over the last decade. According to polling by the National Drug Strategy Household Survey (NDSHS) in 2019, more Australians now support legalisation of cannabis than remain opposed. In 2019, the survey reported that 41% of Australians supported the legalisation of cannabis, 37% remained opposed, and 22% were undecided. In the 2022–2023 NDSHS support for the legalisation of cannabis rose to 45%. There have also been some associated changes in public perceptions about other cannabis-related policies. For example, the majority of Australians aged 14 years and over do not support the possession of cannabis being a criminal offence (74% in 2016 compared with 66% in 2010). In 2019 this rose to 78%, before rising again to 80% in 2022–2023.

Cannabis usage is higher among Indigenous Australians (especially Indigenous men) than non-Indigenous Australians, with between 20% and 70% of Indigenous people having used the drug in the past 12 months varying by region. Two common names for cannabis in Aboriginal English and in Indigenous Australian languages are gunja and yarndi.

== History ==
=== Early history ===
The first record of common hemp seeds brought to Australia was with the First Fleet at the request of Sir Joseph Banks, who marked the cargo "for commerce" in the hope that hemp would be produced commercially in the new colony. For 150 years, early governments in Australia actively supported the growing of hemp with gifts of land and other grants, and the consumption of cannabis in Australia in the 19th century was believed to be widespread.

Marcus Clarke, author of the great Australian novel For the Term of his Natural Life, experimented with cannabis as an aid to writing. A short story he wrote, Cannabis Indica, was written under the influence of cannabis. Members of Melbourne's bohemian Yorrick Club (of which Clarke was a member) were notorious cannabis users. Until the late 19th century, "Cigares De Joy" (cannabis cigarettes) were widely available; these claimed to "give immediate relief in cases of asthma, cough, bronchitis, hay-fever, influenza [and] shortness of breath".

Like many developed nations, Australia first responded to the issue of cannabis use in the 1920s, acting as a signatory to the 1925 Geneva Convention on Opium and Other Drugs that saw the use of cannabis restricted for medicinal and scientific purposes only. Cannabis was grouped with morphine, cocaine and heroin, despite cannabis' use as a medicine or remedy in Australia at the time.

This prohibition model was applied with little research into cannabis use in Australia. Most drug-related laws enacted by jurisdictions of Australia during this time were related to opium but, as a result of pressure from the United Kingdom, Australia began implementing local laws consistent with the Geneva Convention.

The Australian Capital Territory was the first jurisdiction to outlaw cannabis in 1926, followed by Victoria (1927), South Australia (1934), New South Wales (1935), Queensland (1937), Western Australia (1950), and Tasmania (1959).

In 1938, the newspaper Smith's Weekly ran a Reefer Madness-style shock campaign, carrying a headline reading, "New Drug that Maddens Victims". This campaign introduced the word "marijuana" to Australia. It described marijuana as "an evil sex drug that causes its victims to behave like raving sex maniacs", "the dreaded sex drug marijuana" and "The Biggest Gateway Drug". The campaign was only moderately successful; it failed to instill the generation with false negative effects of the drug and its impact on society, it did not stop an increase in demand and usage.

=== 1960s ===
The 1960s saw an increase in the use of cannabis, heroin and LSD as part of political and social opposition to the Vietnam War, and this resulted in most Australian states gradually moving to a prohibitionist and criminal-justice orientation. Right-wing Australian politicians like Queensland premier Joh Bjelke-Petersen and NSW premier Robert Askin supported Nixon's war on drugs in America, calling for a crackdown on Australian youth culture. Following the fall of the Whitlam government in 1975, these politicians launched a Nixon-style war on drugs in Australia.

In the late 1960s, organised drug trafficking developed in Sydney with the arrival of US servicemen on leave from the Vietnam War, and the local drug markets expanded to meet their requirements. The 1970s were considered the first "decade of drugs", marked by the public's growing financial capacity to support drug use and an increase in young people affected by unemployment. As a result, the 1970s were also the decade of Royal Commissions and inquiries to deal with the "drug problem".

In 1964, with the discovery of hundreds of acres of wild hemp growing in the Hunter Valley in NSW, authorities responded with a massive eradication campaign. However, the baby-boomers of the 60s responded to the "evil threat" in a very different manner to the previous generation, with groups of surfers and hippies flocking to the Hunter Region in search of the wild weed which was described in reports as "a powerful psychoactive aphrodisiac". These groups became known as the Weed Raiders—legendary characters, bearing tales of plants up to three metres tall.

=== 1970s–1980s ===
In 1973, tribes of hippies attended the Aquarius Festival in the Northern NSW town of Nimbin. When police tried to arrest revellers who were openly smoking marijuana, the crowd of 6,000 rioted. Nimbin is home to the Hemp Embassy, founded by activist pioneer Michael Balderstone, and the MardiGrass, an annual protest dedicated to cannabis which began in 1993.

According to Jiggens, by 1977 there was talk of decriminalisation of cannabis in New South Wales, following the decriminalisation of cannabis in nine US states. The Joint Committee upon Drugs of the NSW Parliament recommended the removal of jail sentences for personal use of cannabis, and NSW Premier Neville Wran outlined a plan to remove jail sentences for people convicted and for possessing cannabis for personal use. He said that cannabis use was widespread and that "tens of thousands of parents whose sons and daughters smoke marijuana" would not want their children to carry "the stigma of being a jailed, convicted criminal".

The disappearance of local political and community leader Donald Mackay in Griffith, NSW, in July 1977 placed the issue of the nexus between illicit drug production, organised crime and police corruption before the public; this was due to Mackay's revelations about large-scale marijuana growing in the Riverina area. His inquiries led to the largest cannabis seizure in Australian history at Coleambally, 60 kilometres (37 mi) south of Griffith, in November 1975. The plantation spread over 31 acres (13 ha) and was estimated to be capable of producing 60 tonnes of cannabis. The NSW Royal Commission into Drug Trafficking (the Woodward Inquiry) was sparked by Mackay's disappearance, and the story was brought to life as an acclaimed television mini-series Underbelly: A Tale of Two Cities.

In August 1976, NSW Police conducted a predawn raid on the Tuntable Falls Co-operative, located just south of Nimbin; a few weeks later, the Cedar Bay commune, located in far northern Queensland, was raided by Queensland Police. Joh Bjelke-Petersen defended the police action (including the burning of houses on the commune), declaring he was "tough on drugs". His accomplice in the Cedar Bay raid was the young John Howard (then Minister for Business), who later served as Prime Minister from 1996 to 2007. This would develop into an international news story.

In terms of the broader population, cannabis was not widely used in Australia until the 1970s. Legislation reflected increased usage of cannabis; in 1985, the National Campaign Against Drug Abuse was introduced, which was an assessment of illicit drug use among the general population. Prior to 1985, it was concluded that cannabis use amongst Australians rose from the early 1970s throughout the 1980s.

Donnelly and Hall report that in a survey conducted in 1973, 22% of Australians aged 20–29 years reported ever using cannabis. This rose to 56% in 1985, and school surveys show a marked increase in cannabis use during the 1970s and 1980s. The rise in the use of cannabis continued into the 1990s with the 1998 household survey recording the highest prevalence of cannabis use, with 39% of those surveyed using cannabis at least once and 18% reporting cannabis use in the past year. By 2001, the lifetime rate had fallen to one-third of the population.

The 1978 NSW Joint Parliamentary Committee Upon Drugs supported the decriminalisation of cannabis; under the proposal, personal use of cannabis would no longer be an offence and users would be given bonds and probation. Trafficking in cannabis would carry severe penalties. However, the 1979 Australian Royal Commission of Inquiry into Drugs recommended against decriminalisation, concluding that such a step would contravene the UN Single Convention on Narcotic Drugs and lead to calls for the decriminalisation of other drugs. The recommendation was that the consideration of decriminalisation be delayed for another 10 years.

In 1985, against a backdrop of growing awareness at community and government levels of illicit drug use, the National Campaign Against Drug Abuse (NCADA), was launched.

Since 1985, the national drug policy in Australia has been based on the principle of criminalisation and harm minimisation; the National Campaign against Drug Abuse has since become the National Drug Strategy. The National Cannabis Strategy 2006–2009 was endorsed in 2006.

In 1986, South Australia adopted an expiation notice scheme for possession and cultivation of small amounts of cannabis for adult offenders. Under the scheme, if the fine issued under the expiation notice is paid then no conviction is recorded and Juveniles are dealt with in the children's court.

In 1989, the Parliamentary Joint Committee on the National Crime Authority released a report titled Drugs, Crime, and Society, which stated that, "If the aim of the policy (of prohibition) was to reduce the use of prohibited substances, or even to minimise access to them, it has clearly failed".

=== 1990s ===
In 1990, the commonwealth government ratified the United Nations Convention on Illicit Trafficking in Narcotics and Psychotropic Substances via the Crimes (Traffic in Narcotic Drugs and Psychotropic Substances) Act 1990.

In 1991, the ACT Legislative Assembly Select Committee on HIV, Illegal Drugs and Prostitution published a report titled Marijuana and Other Illegal Drugs, the committee recommended that possession and cultivation of small amounts of cannabis no longer be an offence. The committees recommendations were not adopted, instead the Drugs of Dependence (Amendment) Act 1992 created simple cannabis offences for both adults and juveniles. Under the act a simple cannabis offence results in a fine which if paid within 60 days, means that no conviction will be recorded.

In 1994, the Australian National Task Force on Cannabis formed under the Ministerial Council on Drug Strategy, recommended the government develop a national cannabis policy imposing civil penalties for personal use. The Council did not accept the task force's key recommendation, for reasons that are unknown because their deliberations are secret. Although the NTFC's research and accompanying reviews were still published.

In December 1995, Victorian Premier Jeff Kennett established the Premier's Drug Advisory Council which published a report titled Drugs and Our Community on 10 April 1996. The council recommended that possession and cultivation of small amounts of cannabis no longer be an offence, "convictions for the possession of small amounts of marijuana should be expunged from a person's criminal record", "use and possession of heroin, cocaine, amphetamines, ecstasy and cannabis products other than marijuana should remain an offence. However, the penalty for a first offence should be a caution and referral to a treatment service". The government did not adopt all of the recommendations, instead a system of cautions for minor cannabis offenders that would see first time offenders referred to a treatment or education service was introduced.

In 1995, the Western Australian Government Task Force on Drug Abuse published a report titled Protecting the Community. The task force stated "There should be a major emphasis on law enforcement" and that "Law enforcement should be underpinned by clear and unequivocal opposition to all forms of illicit drug use". The task force recommended increased powers for police.

In 1995, the South Australian legislative Councils Select committee on the control and illegal use of drugs of dependence released a report recommending that, "where a person does not pay a cannabis expiation notice, no criminal conviction should be recorded" and that the South Australian government "should enact laws to regulate the cultivation and sale of cannabis, in order to combat black market and criminal activity associated with the distribution and sale of cannabis.

On 28 February 1996, the Northern Territory Legislative Assembly passed the Misuse of Drugs Amendment Act 1996. The amendments allow for police to use discretion to issue an infringement notice to an adult who is in possession of or is cultivating small amounts of cannabis. In his Second Reading Speech on the act, the Northern Territory Attorney-General, Steve Hatton stated "the personal possession of even the smallest amount of cannabis will remain an offence under Northern Territory law, and police will retain the discretion to prosecute the possession of cannabis through the courts. However, the government is prepared to face the reality that the possession and use of cannabis is widespread in the community, regardless of the penalties that have been imposed in relation to its use... The government's view is that, in the situation where no other person is being harmed as a result of the conduct of the offender, a criminal conviction for such behaviour is disproportionate. It is the government's view that it is a waste of police resources to insist on the prosecution of adult offenders before the courts." The Act commenced on 1 July 1996.

In 1998, Victoria became the first Australian State to pass legislation allowing for the commercial production of industrial hemp, under license, followed by Queensland, also under license in the same year. The Drugs Misuse Act 1986 and the Drugs Misuse Regulation 1987 regulate the commercial production of industrial hemp in Queensland.

=== 2000–2012 ===
According to Donnelly and Hall, although changes in willingness to divulge illicit drug use and changing survey protocol and design are likely to have contributed to the change in observed prevalence, the extent and consistency of the increase suggests that an actual rise in cannabis use has occurred. Various polls conducted suggest that the Australian public support legalizing marijuana. The 2001 Report of the International Narcotics Control Board noted that hydroponic cultivation of cannabis in Australia was increasing, as outdoor cultivation was decreasing.

Between 13 and 17 August 2001, then Western Australian premier Geoff Gallop held a Community Drug Summit. The summit produced 45 recommendations in relation to drug policy including cannabis, one such recommendation related to a "prohibition with civil penalties scheme".

The Australian Capital Territory government passed the Hemp Fibre Industry Facilitation Act and the Western Australian government passed the Industrial Hemp Act in 2004 allowing for the commercial production of industrial hemp under license.

On 22 March 2004, the Cannabis Infringement Notice (CIN) scheme commenced in Western Australia under the Gallop-led government.

The Hemp Industry Act 2008, allowed for the commercial production of industrial hemp in NSW, under license.

In 2010, in the media details, a hemp grower on the Northern Beaches of Sydney who has legally grown 500 hemp plants in his backyard. The Sydney Morning Herald describes cultivator Richard Friar as a hemp evangelist—a firm believer in the world-changing potential of cannabis, which can be used in everything from food to fabrics and building materials. With permission from the NSW Department of Primary Industries, Friar and his wife are part of a pilot project aimed at educating farmers to the benefits of growing hemp for its by-products from food to fabric. The author also notes that, in December 2009, Friar applied to Food Standards Australia New Zealand for permission to sell the seed for human consumption; approval is expected. In 2012, hemp seeds and protein are readily available for purchase in health food stores, but with labels that say the product is not for human consumption.

In 2011, following a long campaign the CIN scheme introduced under the Gallop led government was repealed under the Barnett government. When the scheme was initially introduced in 2003 Barnett stated Young people will lose their lives because of this legislation...."I know that sounds dramatic, but it is a fact." The move was reportedly part of a "tough on crime" approach.

In November 2012, Sativex, an oromucosal spray containing cannabinoids, was included in the Australian Register of Therapeutic Goods for the treatment of muscle spasticity related to multiple sclerosis.

=== 2012–2024 ===
In 2015, Tasmania passed the Industrial Hemp Act allowing for the commercial production of industrial hemp under license.

In May 2015, AusCann announced that they were planning to grow cannabis sativa on Norfolk Island. The two-hectare site would provide up to ten tonnes of product, with plans to export to Canada. AusCann was the first company in Australia to be granted a license to grow and export medicinal cannabis. AusCann also explored the possibility of growing cannabis on Christmas Island. However, by late 2016, those plans were abandoned.

On 25 June 2015, the Senate referred an inquiry into personal choice and community impacts to the Senate Economics References Committee for inquiry and report by 13 June 2016. Due to the general election on 2 July 2016, this inquiry lapsed and was subsequently not re-referred in the 45th Parliament. The committee tabled an interim Interim Report Into The Sale & Use Of Marijuana & Associated Products in May 2016, which recommended that, "the Australian Government, in conjunction with the states and territories, undertake an objective assessment of prohibition, decriminalisation, limited deregulation and legalisation, including a full cost-benefit analysis, based on the outcomes of these options in other parts of the world".

On 17 October 2015, the Federal Government announced that it would legalise the commercial growing of cannabis for medicinal and scientific purposes. On 24 February 2016, the Australian parliament made amendments to the Narcotic Drugs Act that legalised the commercial growing of cannabis for medicinal and scientific purposes.

On 12 November 2017, the commercial production of industrial hemp was allowed for, under license, in South Australia, under the Industrial Hemp Act 2017. On the same day the Food Standards Australia New Zealand (FSANZ) made Hemp seeds legal for human consumption in Australia.

Following 2017 recommendations from deputy coroner Anthony Schapel, Attorney-General Vickie Chapman introduced a bill to quadruple fines and reintroduce prison sentences in South Australia for cannabis possession. However Miss Chapman backtracked on the reintroduction of prison sentences after community backlash. Miss Chapman stated that it was clear that the change was “not in line with the views of a significant portion of the community”.

On 9 May 2018, Senator David Leyonhjelm introduced a Bill to allow states to remove Commonwealth barriers to the legalisation, regulation and taxation of cannabis, Senator Leyonhjelm's main argument against the prohibition of cannabis use was that ‘adults should be free to make their own choices as long as they do not harm others’. Both major parties at the time and One Nation did not support the bill. The bill lapsed at the end of parliament on 1 July 2019 after the second debate on 15 October 2018.

In September 2018, the Queensland Government instructed the Queensland Productivity Commission to undertake an Inquiry into imprisonment and recidivism in Queensland, the final report was sent to the Queensland Government on 1 August 2019 and publicly released on 31 January 2020 which recommended a staged reform to legalise cannabis. The Palaszczuk Queensland Labor Party led state government then rejected the recommendations of its own commission and said it had no plans to alter any laws around cannabis.

On 17 October 2018, the Western Australia Legislative Council established the Select Committee into Alternate Approaches to Reducing Illicit Drug Use and its Effects on the Community. The Committee inquired into approaches to reducing harm from illicit drug use in other jurisdictions and compared their effectiveness to the approaches currently used in Western Australia. In November 2019, the committee published a report titled Help, Not Handcuffs: Evidence-based Approaches To Reducing Harm From Illicit Drug Use. The committee made a number of recommendations including that "criminal penalties for the use and possession of drugs for personal use are replaced with administrative penalties", drug use is treated primarily as a health issue and "a health-based response to the use and possession of drugs makes provision for the cultivation of cannabis for personal use". The recommendations were rejected by the McGowan, Labor led state government minutes after the report was publicly released, stating, "We are not going to soften our approach to illicit drug use".

On 27 November 2018, Richard Di Natale introduced The Australian Cannabis Agency Bill to regulate the production and distribution of recreational cannabis. Senator Di Natale said "it was more harmful to continue banning the use of cannabis, calling on Australia to "get real". And that "As someone who was a drug and alcohol doctor, I've seen how damaging the tough on drugs approach is to people".

On 20 February 2019, the ACT Legislative Assembly passed a motion to refer the Drugs of Dependence (Personal Cannabis Use) Amendment Bill 2018 (Bill) to the Standing Committee on Health, Ageing and Community Services (Committee) for inquiry. The committee reported on 6 June 2019 and recommended that the bill be passed, as well as a number of other recommendations, that were adopted, the committee also recommend that the ACT government work with ACT policing to determine a cannabis driving policy that tests for impairment, although this recommendation was not adopted. The Personal Cannabis Use Bill was passed on 25 September 2019, new laws came into effect on 31 January 2020, possession of small amounts of cannabis and one or two plants remains an offence under the Drugs of Dependence Act, however the Act creates exceptions for persons aged over the age of eighteen, allowing for possession of up to 50 grams of dry material, 150 grams of wet material, and cultivation of 2 plants per individual and up to 4 plants per household. Those under the age of 18 are not exempt people under the amendments and police officers hold ultimate direction to issue persons under the age of 18 a SCON(Simple Cannabis Offence Notice) or divert them to a drug and alcohol diversion program, If the SCON fine is paid within 60 days, no conviction will be recorded, failure to pay the penalty order may result in proceedings before the court. Under the changes it is also prohibited to use cannabis in a public place, expose a child or young person to cannabis smoke, store cannabis where children can reach it, grow cannabis using hydroponics or artificial cultivation, grow plants where they can be accessed by the public, share or give cannabis as a gift to another person, or to drive with any cannabis in your system, for people aged under 18 to grow, possess, or use cannabis. To assess the impact of the changes, a review will be conducted by the territory government within three years.

On 31 May 2019, the Victorian legislative council instructed the Legal and Social Issues Committee to open an inquiry into the use of cannabis to examine access to and use of cannabis in Victoria, such as ways to prevent children and young people accessing and using cannabis, prevent criminal activity relating to the illegal cannabis trade in Victoria and protecting public health and public safety in relation to the use of cannabis in Victoria. The committee was also instructed to assess successful models from international jurisdictions and consider how the outcomes may be adapted for Victoria. The committee opened submissions from the public on 18 May 2020 with a closing date for submissions of 31 August 2020. On 5 August 2021 the commission tabled a report in parliament. The report made a number of recommendations including that "the Victorian Government investigates the impacts of legalising cannabis for adult personal use in Victoria" and "That the Victorian Government reviews existing drug driving offences relating to cannabis." The committee stated "this should include a consideration of alternative methods that could be used for detection and measuring impairment, noting that current tests do not adequately measure impairment and that THC can be detected in a person’s system long after they are no longer affected by the drug." The committee also made a number of findings including that, "school-based drug education is more effective when it is based on a harm-minimisation approach and not abstinence-based messaging", that "public health and drug education campaigns should avoid harmful stereotypes of users and reinforcing stigma" and that a criminal record for a cannabis use or possession offence creates barriers that are counterproductive.

On 22 August 2019, the Standing Committee on Agriculture and Water Resources, was instructed to inquire into and report on, the opportunities and impediments to the primary production sectors of Australia. In December 2020, the committee made a number of recommendations including, that the Department of Agriculture, Water and the Environment "review the regulations applying to the growing and processing of industrial Hemp", the committee also recommend that the "review should include the scheduling of industrial Hemp products by the Therapeutic Goods Administration and consider how any barriers restricting producers from accessing the full value of the hemp plant including the food, fibre, and nutraceuticals can be overcome".

On 15 October 2019, Cate Faehrmann gave a Notice of Motion to introduce the Cannabis Industry Bill 2019 to legalise cannabis and cannabis products; to regulate the sale, supply and advertising of cannabis and cannabis products; and for other purposes in New South Wales.

On 14 November 2019, the Senate referred an inquiry titled the current barriers around patient access to the Senate Community Affairs Reference Committee, On 26 March 2020, the inquiry recommend that "the Department of Health, in collaboration with the Australian Medical Association, the Royal Australian College of General Practitioners and other specialist colleges and health professional bodies, develop targeted education and public awareness campaigns to reduce the stigma around medicinal cannabis within the community". The committee also made a number of other recommendations including amnesty for "possession and/or cultivation of cannabis for genuine self medication purposes".

On 6 May 2020, the Hemp Industry Act 2019 and associated Regulations commenced in the Northern Territory allowing for the commercial production of industrial hemp under license.

On 17 February 2021, Cate Faehrmann introduced the Cannabis Legalisation Bill 2021 to legalise cannabis and cannabis products; to regulate the sale, supply and advertising of cannabis and cannabis products; and for other purposes in New South Wales.

On 10 August 2023, Greens Senator David Shoebridge introduced the Legalising Cannabis Bill 2023 into the Australian Senate. The bill aims to legalise Cannabis for recreational use, growing and supply federally across Australia. The bill maintained no official support from both Labor and The Coalition. The bill introduced by Shoebridge was unsuccessful and did not pass the House of Representatives

== Usage ==
According to J. Copeland from the NCPIC and others, cannabis in Australia is commonly smoked as a cluster (or "cone", similar to "bowls" as known in the United States) of the flowering heads (buds) or resin glands (also known as Hashish) of the female plant. Typically, cannabis is smoked using a bong, pipe or joint. There is an increasing prevalence of electric vapourisers for inhalation of cannabis. Cannabis is also consumed in other forms such as Tinctures of cannabis, Cannabis edibles.

Cannabis was not commonly used in Australia until the 1970s. Since then it has gradually increased until the late 1990s when it was at its highest usage. It is the most commonly used illicit drug in Australia. In the early 2000s patterns of use are similar to those throughout the developed world with heaviest use occurring in the early 20s, followed by a steady decline into the 30s, with ninety percent of experimental or social recreational users of cannabis not going on to use the substance daily or for a prolonged period; most discontinued its use by their late 20s.

=== Consumption ===
==== 2010–2020 ====
Cannabis continues to be the world's most widely used illicit drug, with an estimated annual prevalence of 3.9% of the adult population aged 15–64 years, or the equivalent of 192 million people having used cannabis at least once in 2018. The reported consumption of cannabis in Australia and New Zealand in 2018 (10.6%) was substantially higher than the global average (UNODC 2020).

The 2019 NDSHS showed that cannabis continues to have the highest reported prevalence of lifetime and recent consumption among the general population, compared with other illicit drugs, for people aged 14 and over in Australia 36% had used cannabis in their lifetime, up 1% from 2016 and 11.6% had used cannabis recently up 1.2% since 2016. Note: for the first time in 2019, people who had used cannabis only for medicinal purposes and always had it prescribed by a doctor were identified and excluded from data relating to the recent use of cannabis.

- The average age range of initiation for people who use cannabis was 18.9 (mean) or 17.2 (median)
- The median age of people who used cannabis was 26 in 2001 and increased to 31 in 2019
- The age group most likely to use recently was 20–29
- People are also using cannabis more frequently since 2016 with the percentage of people who use cannabis daily increasing from 36% in 2016 to 37% in 2019, the percentage of people who used cannabis once a month increased from 12.1% to 12.8%, the percentage of people who used cannabis every few months increased from 17.3% to 17.8% and the percentage of people who used cannabis once or twice a year fell from 34% to 32%.

The 2016 NDSHS showed that cannabis continues to have the highest reported prevalence of lifetime and recent consumption among the general population, compared with other illicit drugs (Tables S2.31 and S2.32).

- For people aged 14 and over in Australia in 2016, 35% (or approximately 8.9 million) had used cannabis in their lifetime and 10.4% (or 2.1 million) used cannabis in the prior 12 months (Figure CANNABIS1).
- Recent and lifetime use of cannabis has remained relatively stable over the past decade but there were some statistically significant changes among different age groups (AIHW 2017) (Tables S2.38 and S2.39).

==== 2000–2010 ====
Males aged 14 years or older were slightly more likely than their female counterparts to have ever used cannabis (37.1% versus 30.0%), and one in five teenagers aged 14 to 19 reported having used cannabis. This difference is seen across all age groups except the 14- to 19-year-olds, in which there is little difference between males and females in terms of lifetime and past-year use.

Of the entire population, those aged 30 to 39 years were the most likely (54.6%) to have used cannabis at some time in their lives. According to McLaren and Mattick, the lower proportion of cannabis use among older age groups compared with younger users is even more striking when recent use is assessed; males aged 14 and older were more likely than corresponding females to have used cannabis in the previous 12 months (1.0 million and 0.6 million, respectively). 12.9% of teenagers aged 14 to 19 had used cannabis in the previous 12 months; those aged 20 to 29 were the most likely age group to have used cannabis in the previous 12 months, with one in five having done so.

According to Hall, although rates of cannabis use are considerable, most people who use cannabis do so infrequently. According to the 2004 household survey, approximately half of all recent cannabis users used the drug less than once a month. However, the proportion of recent cannabis users who use cannabis every day is not considered trivial; it is cited at 16% by the Australian Institute of Health and Welfare. Those aged 30 to 39 were most likely to use cannabis every day. The 2004 household survey also shows that of all respondents who used cannabis on a regular basis, the average number of cones or joints smoked on any one day was 3.2.

Statistics show that between 1995 and 2007 (after peaking in 1998), the proportion of both males and females aged 14 years or older who had used cannabis in the previous 12 months declined steadily. Between 2004 and 2007, the decline was significant. Recent cannabis use dropped steadily since 1998 and significantly between 2004 and 2007—from 11.3% to 9.1%. Cross-sectional analysis of household survey data shows the age of initiation into cannabis is decreasing over time. According to the Mental Health Council of Australia in 2006, the average age of first use for 12– to 19-year-olds was 14.9 years—significantly lower than in previous years.

The percentage of school aged students admitting to past year Cannabis use reduced from 32% in 1996 to 14% in 2005. Cannabis is considered relatively easy to obtain in Australia, with 17.1% of the population recording that they were offered (or had the opportunity to use) cannabis.

In 2010 the number of people in Australia using cannabis increased from 1.6 million in 2007 to 1.9 million in 2010 after peaking in 1998, the proportion of people who had recently used cannabis had been decreasing, but in 2010, it statistically significantly increased significantly from 2007, from 9.1% to 10.3% (Table 6.1), an increase that was reflected for both males’ and females’.

=== Indigenous Australians ===
Historical and social factors have contributed to the widespread use of tobacco and alcohol among Indigenous communities and according to Perkins, Clough and others, the use of illicit drugs (cannabis in particular) is higher among Aboriginal and Torres Strait Islander peoples than among the non-Indigenous population of Australia.

Little detailed information is available on cannabis use in urban or remote Indigenous communities. J. Copeland from the NCPIC and others cite 2001 National Drug Strategy Household Survey results showing that 27% of Aboriginal and Torres Strait Islander respondents reported using cannabis in the last 12 months, compared with 13% of non-Indigenous Australians. However, these results are likely to under-report cannabis use in non-urban Aboriginal populations; communities are often small, isolated and highly mobile, making data collection problematic. What little detailed information is available on remote Indigenous communities comes mainly from targeted studies of several communities in the Top End of Australia's Northern Territory.

Studies that do provide information on cannabis use within the Indigenous population show pattern of problematic cannabis abuse that exceeds that seen in the mainstream non-Indigenous population. A survey conducted in the mid-1980s by Watson and others failed to detect any cannabis use in Top End Indigenous communities. However, by the late 1990s the Aboriginal Research Council provided information suggesting that cannabis was used by 31% of males and 8% of females in eastern Arnhem Land. A further study in 2002 found that cannabis was being used regularly by 67% of males and 22% of females aged 13 to 36. A survey about drug use conducted in 1997 of two NSW populations of Aboriginal Australians found that 38% had used Cannabis.

As part of the 2004 National Drug Strategy, a survey was conducted assessing drug use among Indigenous populations living in urban areas. Results showed that 48% had tried cannabis at least once, and 22% had used cannabis in the previous year. Regular cannabis use (at least weekly) was also more common among Aboriginal and Torres Strait Island communities than non-Indigenous groups (11% and 4%, respectively).

The 2018–19 NDSHS asked Aboriginal and Torres Strait Islander people aged 14 and over were whether they had used illicit substances in the last 12 months, 5.5% had used cannabis in the last 12 months—almost 1.3 times higher than non-Indigenous Australians (12.0%).

The data describing cannabis use in the Indigenous population compared with non-Indigenous use varies in the ratio of recent cannabis use to those respondents who have ever used cannabis. In the non-Indigenous population, rates of cannabis use in the last 12 months are a third of those ever using cannabis; however, researchers found only a few percentage-points' difference between rates of regular and lifetime use within the Indigenous population.

According to McLaren and Mattick, the reasons for high rates of cannabis use among Aboriginal and Torres Strait Islander communities are complex and likely to be related to the social determinants of drug use. Risk factors associated with harmful substance use are often related to poor health and social well-being, stemming from the alienation and dispossession experienced by this population. Spooner and Hetherington confirm that many of the social determinants of harmful substance abuse are disproportionately present in Aboriginal and Torres Strait Islander communities.

In June 2020, it was revealed that New South Wales Police had pursued criminal charges against more than 82% of Indigenous people caught with small amounts of cannabis, compared with only 52% of non-Indigenous people. In other words, Indigenous people were very likely to get criminally charged, while non-Indigenous people were more likely to receive only a warning. The data was obtained by The Guardian using freedom of information laws.

=== Synthetic cannabinoids ===
Before June 2011, synthetic cannabinoids were relatively unknown in Australia. However, compulsory employee drug tests at Western Australian mines found that 1 in 10 employees had consumed compounds found in synthetic cannabinoids. Their popular usage as opposed to naturally-grown cannabis was attributed to the fact that users could obtain a "legal high", as the compounds in synthetic cannabis were not yet listed as illegal on the Australian Standard for the Uniform Scheduling of Medicines and Poisons [SUSMP] – the governing body of drug listing in Australia. Richard Kevin, a psychopharmacology Ph.D. candidate at the University of Sydney who is studying the effects of the synthetic compounds on mice stated one reason people use these products is to avoid drug testing.

Due to their popularity among recreational drug users, health professionals began researching the drug. As a result of a study by the Drug and Alcohol Review, it was found that 291 of 316 participants reported side effects in an online survey pertaining to the patterns of synthetic marijuana use. These side-effects included panic, vomiting, depression and psychosis and some felt the side effects were serious enough to consider seeking medical assistance.

An additional study conducted with the assistance of the UNSW, found that of 1100 self-reported synthetic drug users, 10% of individuals who had admitted to trying synthetic marijuana felt they were going to die, and 75% said they wouldn't try it again.

People who use large quantities of synthetic cannabis may become sedated or disoriented and may experience toxic psychosis – not knowing who they are, where they are, or what time it is. High doses may also cause fluctuating emotions, fragmentary thoughts, paranoia, panic attacks, hallucinations and feelings of unreality.

== Legislation and policy ==
In 1913 Australia signed the International Hague Convention on Narcotics, and extended importation controls over drugs other than opium. 1921 saw the first international drug treaty (The Opium Convention), and in 1925 the Geneva Convention on Opium and Other Drugs saw restrictions imposed on the manufacture, importation, sale, distribution, exportation and use of cannabis, opium, cocaine, morphine and heroin for medical and scientific purposes only.

In 1926 the Commonwealth Government banned the importation of cannabis; in 1928 Victoria passed the Poisons Act and became the first state to control cannabis, followed by South Australia (1934), NSW (1935), Queensland (1937), Western Australia (1950) and Tasmania (1959). In 1940 the Commonwealth extended import restrictions on Indian hemp, including preparations containing hemp.

In 1961 Australia signed the International Single Convention on Narcotic Drugs, this convention supports an obligation to make cannabis available as a medicine. On 30 May 1967 the commonwealth government introduced the Narcotic Drugs Act 1967 this Act gives effect to certain of Australia's obligations under the Single Convention on Narcotic Drugs, 1961. The 1961 Single Convention has since been supplemented by the Convention on Psychotropic Substances and United Nations Convention Against Illicit Traffic in Narcotic Drugs and Psychotropic Substances.

On 24 February 2016, the Australian parliament made amendments to the Narcotic Drugs Act that legalised the growing of cannabis for medicinal and scientific purposes.

On 12 November 2017 Food Standards Australia New Zealand (FSANZ) made Hemp food legal for human consumption in Australia.

According to the Ministerial Council on Drug Strategy, the National Drug Strategy and its substance-specific strategies were written for the general population of Australia. The Aboriginal and Torres Strait Islander Peoples Complementary Action Plan 2003–2006 was developed as a supplement to the national action plans so that these plans could be applied to Australia's indigenous communities.

According to Copeland and others from the NCPIC at national level, there is no overriding law that deals with cannabis-related offences; instead, each state and territory enacts its own legislation, while some jurisdictions enforce criminal penalties for possession, use and supply, others enact civil penalties for minor cannabis offences. Conviction for a criminal offence will attract a criminal record and can be punishable by jail time and harsh fines. Civil penalties, however, do not result in a criminal record and are generally handled by lesser fines, mandatory treatment and diversion programmes.

In March 2025, independent costings estimated that the legalisation of recreational cannabis in Australia could generate $700 million per year for Australia's budget.

=== Australian states and territories ===
| Legal for recreational use | Legal for medical use | Illegal | D Decriminalised |

| State | | Possession | Cultivation | Medical | Notes |
|---|---|---|---|---|---|
| Australian Capital Territory See Cannabis in the Australian Capital Territory | | Legal up to 50 grams of dried cannabis or up to 150 grams of fresh cannabis | Legal for recreational use up to two cannabis plants at your home per person, with a maximum of four plants per household. | via federal law | |
| New South Wales | | Illegal; diversion if first two offenses and <15 grams, max. $2,200 and 2 years for possession | Illegal; $11,000 and 2 years for non-trafficable quantities | via federal law | |
| Northern Territory | D* | Illegal; max. $200 fine for ≤50 grams max. 2 years for >50 grams and/or possession in a public place | Illegal; $200 fine for two non-hydroponic plants max. life sentence for cultivation in front of a child | via federal law | |
| Queensland | | Illegal; diversion if first offence and <50 grams max. 15 years for <500 grams (or 100 plants) max. 20 years for >500 grams (or 100 plants) | Illegal | via federal law | |
| South Australia | | Illegal; max. $150 fine for ≤100 grams max. $2000 and 2 years for >100 grams | Illegal; max. $150 fine for one non-hydroponic plant | via federal law | |
| Tasmania | | Illegal; diversion if first three offenses and <50 grams, max. $7950 and 2 years for >50 grams | Illegal | via federal law | |
| Victoria See Cannabis in Victoria | | Illegal; diversion if first or second offense and ≤50 grams, max. $2,200 and 2 years for possession max. $550,000 and 15–20 years for trafficking | Illegal | via state and federal law | |
| Western Australia | | Illegal; diversion if first offense and ≤10 grams, max. $2,000 and 2 years for 10-100 grams max. $20,000 and 2 years for >100 grams | Illegal | via federal law | |

In the Australian Capital Territory, the Personal Cannabis Use Bill was passed on 25 September 2019, new laws came into effect on 31 January 2020, possession of small amounts of cannabis and one or two plants remains an offence under the act, however the Act creates exceptions for persons aged over the age of eighteen, allowing for possession of up to 50 grams of dry material, 150 grams of wet material, and cultivation of 2 plants per individual and up to 4 plants per household. Those under the age of 18 are not exempt people under the amendments and police officers hold ultimate direction to issue persons under the age of 18 a SCON (Simple Cannabis Offence Notice) or divert them to a drug and alcohol diversion program. If the SCON fine is paid within 60 days no conviction will be recorded, failure to pay the penalty order may result in proceedings before the court. Under the changes it is also prohibited to use cannabis in a public place, expose a child or young person to cannabis smoke, store cannabis where children can reach it, grow cannabis using hydroponics or artificial cultivation, grow plants where they can be accessed by the public, share or give cannabis as a gift to another person, or to drive with any cannabis in your system and for people aged under 18 to grow, possess, or use cannabis.

In South Australia under the Expiation of Offences Act 1996, for persons over the age of 18 years, simple cannabis offences are defined as cultivating one cannabis plant without artificial enhancement, possession of up to 100 grams of cannabis, possession of up to 20 grams of cannabis resin, consuming cannabis (except in a public place). Simple cannabis offenses are punished by an expiation notice (fine) that does not require a court summons or create a criminal record. If an expiation notice is not paid charges typically carry a $500–$1000 maximum fine and the possibility of a criminal conviction being recorded. Supply and low-level cultivation offences carry a maximum $2000 fine and/or 2 years imprisonment. Trafficking, sale, and/or cultivation or a commercial or ‘large commercial’ quantity carry a maximum penalty of up to $200,000 and 25 years imprisonment.

In Western Australia, as of August 2011: a person found in possession of ten grams or less of cannabis may receive a Cannabis Intervention Requirement notice to attend a mandatory one on one counselling session. Persons over 18 can only receive one CIR, while a young person (aged 14–17 years) can receive two. Subsequent minor cannabis-related offences will be prosecuted through the courts. Quantities larger than ten grams attract a penalty of up to A$2000 or two years in jail, or both. A person found in possession of more than 100g of cannabis would be deemed to have that quantity for supply and could face a penalty of A$20,000 or two years in jail. Opposing political sides have accused the government of changing the laws to appear tough on drugs in response to an increased public fear of clandestine drug labs following a number of them exploding in suburban areas, such as the Lilac Pass Incident.

In Queensland, under the Drugs Misuse Regulation Act 1987, possession of cannabis or any schedule 1 or 2 drug carries a maximum prison sentence of 15 years and is a criminal offence. Under the Police Powers and Responsibilities Act of 2000 a person who admits to carrying under 50 g (and is not committing any other offence) may be offered a drug diversion program if it is their first offence at the officers discretion. In Queensland, it is a criminal offence to give, distribute, sell, administer, transport or supply a dangerous drug. If drugs are located in a person's house, car, or other place of which they are the occupier, then they are 'deemed' to be in possession of the drug unless they can prove otherwise. Importation and trafficking of dangerous drugs are each offences that carry maximum penalties of life imprisonment.

In New South Wales under section 21 of the Drug Misuse and Trafficking Act 1985 possession of cannabis is a criminal offence and carries a maximum penalty of up to 2 years imprisonment, and/or a fine of up to $2,200. If an individual is caught with up to 15 g of cannabis, at police discretion they may be diverted to a drug and alcohol diversion program, up to two diversions can be issued. Under Section 333 of the NSW Criminal Procedure Act (1986) police have the discretion to issue a penalty notice of $400. NSW police also operate a cannabis cautioning scheme, if a person admits to being in possession of 15 grams or less of cannabis for personal use, who has had no previous convictions for violent, drug or sexual assault related offences and who is not also involved in another criminal offence at the time may be let off with a caution, at the officers discretion, an individual may only receive two cautions. Manufacturing or cultivating commercial quantities of cannabis carries a maximum penalty of life imprisonment and/or a $550,000 fine. Smaller, but indictable quantities carry a maximum penalty of 15–20 years and $220,000–$385,000. Manufacturing or cultivating less than the indictable quantity of cannabis has a maximum penalty of $11000 and/or 2 years imprisonment.

In Tasmania under the Misuse of Drugs Act 2001 possession of cannabis is a criminal offence, a court diversion program operates in the state, up to three cautions can be issued for possession of up to 50 g of cannabis, with a hierarchy of intervention and referrals for treatment with each caution. The maximum fine for possession of such an implement is 50 penalty units. The maximum penalty for possession is $7950 and/or 2 years imprisonment. Trafficking attracts a maximum term of imprisonment of 21 years. Trafficking of smaller quantities has a maximum term of 4 years imprisonment. An owner or occupier of a premises who knowingly causes, permits, or suffers those premises to be used for or in connection with certain cannabis related offences can also be found guilty of an offence in which case they are liable of a fine of up to 50 penalty units or to imprisonment for a term not exceeding 2 years, or both.

In Victoria possession and use of cannabis is a criminal offence and a diversion program in the state aims to divert offenders into education, assessment and treatment programs. In Victoria, up to 50 g of cannabis can attract a caution and the opportunity to attend an education program (Victoria Cannabis Cautioning Program); only two cautions can be issued.

Adults in the Northern Territory under the Misuse of Drugs Act 1990 persons found in possession of up to 50 g of cannabis, one gram of hash oil, 10 g of hash or cannabis seed/s, or two non-hydroponic plants can be fined A$200 with 28 days to expiate at an officers discretion or face a penalty of a fine of up to 50 penalty units or A$7.750 in court, in the NT, one penalty unit equates to A155.00. Possession in a public place faces a penalty of up to two years imprisonment. Cultivation in front of a child can face a penalty of life in prison. The maximum penalty for trafficking of a commercial quantity is up to 25 years imprisonment, for less than a commercial quantity is up to 2 years imprisonment.

=== Paraphernalia ===
All States and Territories criminalise the sale and supply of 'drug paraphernalia', although the legislation differs slightly from jurisdiction to jurisdiction. The possession of a 'drug paraphernalia' is an offence in all jurisdictions in Australia with the exemptions of Victoria and the ACT.

In NSW the maximum penalty for possession of "equipment for administration of drugs" is a fine of up to 20 penalty units or imprisonment for a term of two years.

In WA the maximum penalty for "possession of drug paraphernalia" is a $36,000 fine or imprisonment for a term of three years or both.

In the NT the maximum penalty for "possession of things for administering dangerous drugs" is a fine of up to 50 penalty units or imprisonment for a term of six months.

In QLD the maximum penalty for "possessing things for use in connection with the administration, consumption or smoking of a dangerous drug" carries penalties of up to two years imprisonment

In SA the maximum penalty for "possession of any piece of equipment for use in connection with the smoking, consumption or administration of a controlled drug" is a fine of up to $2000 or imprisonment for up to 2 years or both.

In TAS the maximum penalty for "possessing thing used for administration of controlled drug" is a fine of up to 50 penalty units.

== Medicinal use ==
=== Legislation and policy ===
On 17 October 2015, the Federal Government announced that it would legalise the commercial growing of cannabis for medicinal and scientific purposes. On 24 February 2016, the Australian parliament made amendments to the Narcotic Drugs Act that legalised the commercial growing of cannabis for medicinal and scientific purposes. The laws came into effect on 1 November 2016. On 17 February 2017, The Office of Drug Control in the Federal Department of Health issued the first Cannabis Research licence under the medicinal cannabis provisions of the Narcotic Drugs Act 1967.

Cannabis medicines must be registered with the Therapeutic Goods Administration, unless they are exempt from being entered into the ARTG, savitex is the only cannabis medicine currently registered on the ARTG. Therapeutic goods not approved may be accessed via the TGA via a special access scheme, such as the SAS, some jurisdictions also require relevant state or territory approvals, although doctors do not have to obtain approval to prescribe schedule four Cannabidiol(CBD) medicines. Doctors may also have to source a pharmacy to supply cannabis medicines to patients in Australia. Due to the current legislation patients must also effectively waive their right to drive or operate heavy machinery if the medicinal cannabis contains tetrahydrocannabinol (THC).

On 15 December 2020 the Therapeutic Goods Administration (TGA) announced a final decision to down-schedule certain low dose cannabidiol (CBD) preparations from Schedule 4 (Prescription Medicine) to Schedule 3 (Pharmacist Only Medicine). The decision limits over-the-counter supply to only those products that are approved by the TGA and included on the Australian Register of Therapeutic Goods (ARTG). As of 15 December 2020, there are currently no TGA approved products on the ARTG that meet the Schedule 3 criteria. To be eligible, medications must be sold in packets with less than 4500 mg of CBD (150 mg/day) and must contain less than 2% of other cannabinoids.

=== Usage ===
According to the national drug strategy household survey 2019, of people who used cannabis in the previous 12 months, 6.8% said they used it only for medical purposes and 16.3% said they sometimes used it for medical purposes and sometimes for other reasons. This equates to 2.7% in the total Australian population (or about 600,000 people) using cannabis for medical purposes, either always or sometimes. Only less than 1% in the total Australia population reported the use of cannabis only for medicinal purposes.

- Older people, particularly those aged 60 and over, were most likely to use cannabis only for medicinal purposes, while people in their 20s were least likely to use it for medicinal purposes. Of people who used cannabis medically only, 43% were aged 50 and over. By comparison, among those who did not use cannabis for medical purposes (non-medically or illicitly), only 16% were aged 50 and over and 49% were aged 14–29.

=== Supply trends ===
According to the NDSHS 2019 When asked if their medical cannabis was prescribed by a doctor, only 3.9% of those who said they used cannabis for medical purposes obtained it by prescription—1.8% always had it prescribed and 2.1% had it sometimes prescribed. That is, among people who reported the use of cannabis for medicinal reasons, 95.9% did so without a doctor's prescription in 2019, three years after the approval of legal access to medical cannabis.

- People who used cannabis for medical purposes (either always or sometimes), usually obtained it from a friend (51%), but 22% purchased it from a dealer; 7.3% grew it themselves and 2.2% had a prescription for a medical condition.
- The National Special Access Scheme has since been streamlined and the number of patients accessing cannabis via the TGA has increased to over 65,000 with 13,000 approvals in September 2021.

=== Production and Importation ===
Since the legalisation of commercially grown cannabis in 2015, there have been a number of Australian medical cannabis cultivators that have been registered to try to meet market demand. Despite this a total of 77.4 tonnes of cannabis was imported into Australia in 2024. However, domestic production increased 59% over the previous year for a total of 42.4 tonnes of medicinal cannabis that same year.

== Supply ==
Medicinal cannabis products and their supply in Australia are regulated by the Therapeutic Goods Administration of Australia.

=== Prevalence and price ===
==== 2010–2020 ====
According to the Australian Institute of Health & Welfare cannabis is relatively easy to obtain in Australia. Regular injecting drug users and users of ecstasy or other stimulants report that cannabis is "easy" or "very easy" to obtain. This has remained stable over time, as has purity and pricing. Perceived availability was the highest for hydroponic cannabis (88% of IDRS users and 90% of EDRS users rated it 'easy'or very easy' to obtain). Bush cannabis (78% of IDRS users and 78% of EDRS users rated it 'easy or very easy' to obtain). The primary source of cannabis reported by recent users aged 14 years or older was friends (66%), followed by dealers (19.9%) in 2016 (AIHW 2017) (Table S2.5).

According to the Australian Criminal Intelligence Commission illicit drug data report 2017-2018

- Nationally, the price for 1 gram of hydroponic cannabis head remained relatively stable this reporting period, ranging between $20 and $50 in 2017–18, compared with a price range of $10 to $50 in 2016–17.
- Nationally, the price of 1 ounce of hydroponic cannabis head remained unchanged this reporting period, ranging between $200 and $450.
- Similar to 2016–17, the price for a single mature hydroponic cannabis plant in 2017–18 ranged between $2,000 and $5,000,
- The price of one gram of cannabis resin (reported in Queensland and Northern Territory) also remaining stable this reporting period, ranging between $25 and $50.

==== 2000–2010 ====
The prevalence of cannabis in Australia indicates that the plant is widely available. The University of New South Wales' National Drug and Alcohol Research Centre's Drug Trends Bulletin for October 2009 shows that 58% of cannabis users in NSW believe hydroponically grown cannabis to be "very easily" available; 43% believe bush-grown cannabis is "very easy" to find. 0% considered hydro cannabis "very difficult" to find and 5% considered bush-grown cannabis to be "very difficult" to find. The results show that figures for the ACT are lower (42% believe hydroponically grown cannabis is "very easy" to find, as do 29% for bush-grown cannabis. 3% and 7%, respectively, believe that cannabis is "very difficult" to find).

Victoria shows similar figures to NSW; 66% and 32%, respectively, believe cannabis is "very easy" to find and 0% and 3%, respectively, believe it is "very difficult" to find. Tasmania shows similar statistics. In South Australia fewer people consider cannabis (either hydroponically- or bush-grown) "very easy" to find (32% and 37% respectively), with the majority considering it "easy" to find (46% and 21%). Western Australia reports similar statistics as South Australia, as does the Northern Territory. Queensland reports statistics similar to NSW with 64% and 56% of respondents reporting hydroponically grown cannabis and bush cannabis, respectively, "very easy" to find and 3% and 6%, respectively, considering it "very difficult" to find.

The majority of cannabis is domestically produced, with outdoor and hydroponic cultivation common in all states and territories. Single and others note that Australia's climate and the amount of space available is conducive to outdoor cultivation. According to the Australian Crime Commission (ACC) the average price for one gram of cannabis ranged from A$20–A$35, although prices in remote areas can be significantly higher. In remote regions of the Northern Territories, for example, the price can reach $50–$100 for a gram.

According to Stafford and Burns, an ounce of hydroponically grown cannabis has risen from A$300–$320 between 2008 and 2009; an ounce of bush weed has increased from A$200–$229. NDSHS notes that one in six Australians reported that they were offered or had the opportunity to use cannabis. The ACC reports that hydroponically grown cannabis is described by 75% of the 2007 NDSHS respondents as being "easy" or "very easy" to obtain; "bush cannabis" (outdoor-grown cannabis), by contrast, is not as readily available and was reported by over half of the respondents as being "easy" to obtain.

Respondents in the National Drug and Alcohol Research Centre (NDARC) October 2009 Drug Trends Bulletin were asked to rate the purity and potency of cannabis. Statistics show that, in general, hydroponically grown cannabis is considered to have high purity and potency (NSW 61%; ACT 54%; Victoria 58%; Tasmania 66%; South Australia 65%; Western Australia 69%; Northern Territory 38% [14% low; 31% medium; 17% fluctuates]; Queensland 58%). Bush-grown cannabis is considered to have medium purity and potency (explained by the greater variables in production), with a number of respondents categorising bush grown cannabis as poor-quality. Respondents reported daily or near-daily use of cannabis.

According to the 2007 NDSHS, 68.5% of cannabis users obtained cannabis from a friend or acquaintance. 4.8% acquired it from a relative, and 19.5% obtained it from a dealer. 7.2% claimed to have acquired the drug in another way, including "grew/made/picked it myself".

=== Seizures and arrests ===
==== 2010–2020 ====
In Australia in 2017–2018 according to the Australian Institute of Health & Welfare the majority of the number of national illicit drug seizures (52.4%) and arrests (48.8%) were for cannabis. However cannabis only accounted for 28.3% of the weight of illicit drugs seized. There were 72,381 cannabis arrests in 2017–18, with the number of national cannabis arrests increasing 30% over the last decade. Of the 72,381 cannabis related arrests in Australia 92% were consumer arrests and 8% were provider arrests.The number and weight of national cannabis seizures has also increased over the decade—the number of seizures increased from 46,875 in 2008–09 to 59,139 in 2017–18 and the weight of seizures increased from 5,573 kilograms in 2008–09 to 8,655 kilograms in 2017–18.

According to the Australian Criminal Intelligence Commission, illicit drug data report 2018–19, "indicators of cannabis demand and supply in Australia provide a mixed picture, but overall point to a large and relatively stable market". The number of cannabis detections at the Australian border increased 666 per cent over the last decade, from 1,454 in 2009–10 to 11,133 in 2018–19. The weight of cannabis detected increased 9,144 per cent over the last decade, from 19.6 kilograms in 2009–10 to 1,811.7 kilograms in 2018–19, the highest weight recorded in the last decade. In 2018–19, detections of cannabis at the Australian border occurred by air cargo, air passenger/crew, international mail and sea cargo streams. By number, the international mail stream accounted for (97 per cent) of detections, followed by air cargo (2 per cent), air passenger/crew (1 per cent) and sea cargo (<1 per cent). By weight, sea cargo accounted (83 per cent) of detections, followed by international mail (11 per cent), air cargo (6 per cent) and air passenger/crew (<1 per cent).

In June 2020, it was revealed that New South Wales Police had pursued criminal charges against more than 82% of Indigenous people caught with small amounts of cannabis, compared with only 52% of non-indigenous people. In other words, Indigenous people were very likely to get criminally charged, while non-Indigenous people were more likely to receive only a warning. The data was obtained by The Guardian using freedom of information laws.

In December 2020 NSW Bureau of Crime Statistics and Research data, show that individuals who commit a cannabis related offense and live in lower socio-economic areas are far more likely to face court, whilst individuals who live in higher socio-economic areas are far more likely to receive a caution than their lower socio-economic counterparts.

==== 2000–2010 ====
According to the Australian Crime Commission (ACC), cannabis accounted for the greatest proportion of national illicit drug arrests and seizures in 2007/2008 – 5409 kg (5,409,000 grams) were seized nationally over 12 months, accounting for 64% of illicit drugs seized in Australia. This equates to 41,660 cannabis seizures, or 68% of all seizures. 2007/2008 saw 52,465 cannabis arrests, a 7% decrease from figures for 2006/2007. The majority of arrests continue to occur in Queensland. Despite a slight decrease from 2006, cannabis continues to be the most commonly detected drug amongst police detainees. Self-reporting within this group identifies hydroponically grown heads as both the preferred and actual form of cannabis used by the majority of detainees. Furthermore, even though the total amount of cannabis arrests has declined since the mid-1990s, suppliers of cannabis are still arrested more often than suppliers of any other drug. For example, in 2005–06 over half of all the people arrested for supplying drugs were supplying cannabis.

== Advocacy ==
A number of Australian and international groups have promoted reform in regard to 21st-century Australian drug policy. Organisations such as Unharm, the International Network of People Who Use Drugs, Australian Parliamentary Group on Drug Law Reform, Responsible Choice, the Australian Drug Law Reform Foundation, NORML Australia, Law Enforcement Against Prohibition (LEAP), and Australia and Drug Law Reform Australia advocate for drug law reform without the benefit of government funding. The membership of some of these organisations is diverse and consists of the general public, social workers, lawyers and doctors, and the Global Commission on Drug Policy has been a formative influence on a number of these organisations.

=== Political parties ===
==== Australian Greens ====
The Australian Greens support the legalisation of cannabis for all adults (aged 18 years old and above).

==== Fusion Party ====
The Fusion Party supports legalising cannabis in Australia. It also supports drug reform generally, such as by advocating a harm minimisation approach.

==== Legalise Cannabis Australia ====
The group was founded as Help End Marijuana Prohibition (HEMP) in 1993 by Nigel Quinlan, who ran as a candidate under the name Nigel Freemarijuana. In 2001, Freemarijuana's name was assessed by the Australian Electoral Commission as to whether it was suitable to be added to the electoral roll – the Commission found that it was, meaning Freemarijuana could run as an electoral candidate under the name. The party changed its name to Legalise Cannabis Australia in September 2021.

The Legalise Cannabis Australia party has a number of policies that centre around the re-legalisation and regulation of cannabis for personal, medical and industrial uses, including:

- to allow for health education, home growing, and regulated sales through registered outlets which will separate cannabis from the criminality of the black-market and end consequent associated corruption.
- to allow medical use, utilising Cannabis’ painkilling, relaxing, anti nausea and healing properties.
- to establish a commercial hemp industry producing fuel, fibre, paper, textiles, food, oil and other environmentally sound products.
- to release all those imprisoned for cannabis alone and the removal of all records of previous criminal cannabis convictions.

==== Legalise Cannabis Queensland Party (LCQ) ====
The Legalise Cannabis Queensland Party was established when a group of like minded people containing members from the H.E.M.P. Party and Medical Cannabis Users Association of Australia (MCUA) and their associated networks formed a Facebook group with the intention of standing as Independents in the October 2020 Queensland state election with the view of working loosely together to push for cannabis law reform in Queensland and share resources. They met in person on several occasions to discuss issues and policy. Then one person suggested maybe a political party would be a better way. With the blessing of the well established federal HEMP Party whose president Michael Balderstone welcomed the news. On 1 July 2020 they submitted registration paperwork to the Australian Electoral Commission to run candidates at the October Queensland state election. On 1 September 2020 the ECQ verified the parties membership list and sent it to the commissioner for the final approval, the party was officially approved on 11 September 2020. They have a number of policies that centre around the re-legalisation and regulation of cannabis for personal, medical and industrial uses in Queensland. Following the registration of the party affiliate parties have also been established in the states of Western and South Australia.

==== Libertarian Party ====
The Libertarian Party supports legalising cannabis for adults.

==== Victorian Socialists ====
The Victorian Socialists support the legalisation of cannabis and the regulated legal market for cannabis with tax proceeds to fund research and programs addressing substance misuse and addiction.

==== Others ====
Many large political parties in Australia support medical cannabis but oppose its recreational usage. This includes both major parties, the centre-right Coalition (the Liberal Party and the National Party) and the centre-left Labor Party. Other minor parties with this policy include One Nation, Katter's Australian Party and the Centre Alliance.

==== Historical ====
===== Australian Marijuana Party =====
The Australian Marijuana Party was an Australian political party founded by Jim Billington that operated between the 1970s and 1980s that campaigned for the legalisation of cannabis.

The party ran a number of candidates including independent journalist and author JJ McRoach and disability and cannabis advocate Gwenda Woods but never elected a candidate.

==== Reason Party ====
During its existence from 2017 to 2024, the Reason Party supported the legalisation of cannabis and a legal and regulated cannabis market in Australia for those aged 18 and over.

=== Public support ===
Support for the legalisation of illicit drugs declined slightly between 2004 and 2007 and support for the legalisation for personal use of cannabis fell between 2004 and 2007, from 27.0% to 21.2%. Males were more likely than females to support legalisation (in 2007, 23.8% versus 18.5%).

Support for cannabis legalisation has grown since 2013, with more Australians now supporting legalisation of cannabis than those who remain opposed. According to the 2019 National Drug Strategy Household Survey (NDSHS), 41% of Australians supported the legalisation of cannabis, 37% remained opposed, and 22% remained undecided. In the 2022–2023 NDSHS support for the legalisation of cannabis rose to 45%. There have also been some associated changes in public perceptions about other cannabis-related policies. For example, the majority of Australians aged 14 years and over do not support the possession of cannabis being a criminal offence (66% in 2010, 74% in 2016, and 80% in 2022–2023).

In a poll taken by YouGov in December 2023, 50% of respondents supported the legalisation of cannabis, including legalising the growing of up to six cannabis plants for personal use and being able to legally share it with friends. 54% stated support for cannabis decriminialstion. Respondents aged 18 to 24 were the most in favour, while respondents aged 65+ were the least in favour.

==== Notable supporters of recreational cannabis ====
- Adam Bandt, former Greens leader and former federal member for Melbourne
- Jeremy Buckingham, Legalise Cannabis member of the New South Wales Legislative Council
- David Ettershank, Legalise Cannabis member of the Victorian Legislative Council
- Rose Jackson, New South Wales Minister for Housing and Labor member of the New South Wales Legislative Council
- Richard Di Natale, former Greens leader and former Senator for Victoria
- Fiona Patten, former Reason member of the Victorian Legislative Council
- David Shoebridge, Greens Senator for New South Wales; tabled the Legalising Cannabis Bill 2023, the first ever bill to decriminalise recreational cannabis on the federal level
- Brian Walker, Legalise Cannabis member of the Western Australian Legislative Council

== Cannabis culture ==
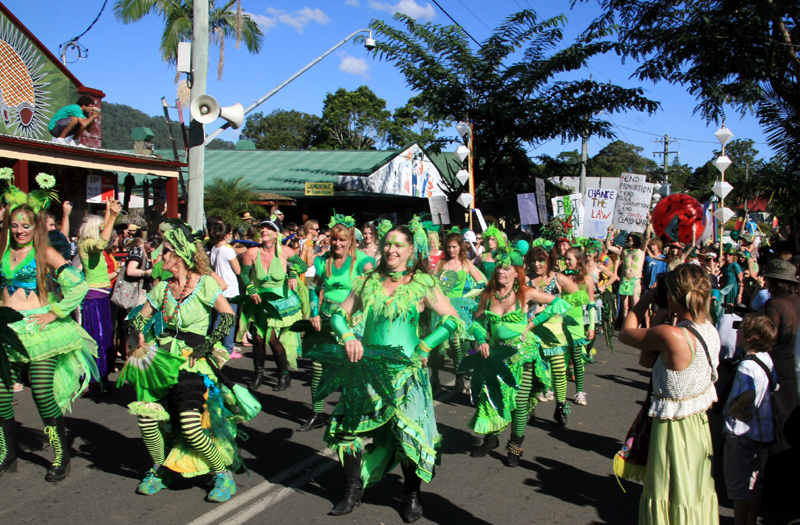
MardiGrass parade at Nimbin, 2008

=== Nimbin Hemp Embassy, Mardi Grass & The HEMP Party ===
Nimbin is a small town within the Northern Rivers Region of NSW, arguably the cannabis counter-culture capital of Australia. In 1973, tribes of hippies attended the Aquarius Festival in the Northern NSW town of Nimbin. The prevalence of a drug culture in Nimbin since 1973 has been accompanied by a prevalence of collective and public creativity: colourful and spiritually motivated art (including large paintings above shop awnings), music, poetry, craft, and fashion can all be seen on the main street. The town is known as a hotspot for alternative social activities, grassroots political discourse, and the espousal of naturalist, humanist, anarchist, feminist, permissive, new-age, mystical, and radical social philosophies (which can all be seen as collective creative endeavours).

The Nimbin Hemp Embassy is a non-profit association that was established in 1992. The embassy's objectives are cannabis law reform via an education program for the community about hemp products and cannabis and "promoting a more tolerant and compassionate attitude to people in general".^{[84]} According to the HEMP Embassy website, "the Nearly NORML Nimbin group formed in 1988 as the district's first enduring drug law reform outfit and later became Nimbin HEMP – Help End Marijuana Prohibition – then later in 1992 the name changed to the Nimbin HEMP Embassy. Generally the group discussed the cannabis laws of NSW and how they might be changed".

In March 1993, after a decade of raids and arrests, and a particularly intensive recent period of random (and illegal) street searches, arrests, rough treatment, pre-dawn raids, regular intimidation and that crushing sense of a province facing conquest, undercover police officers had been discovered buying cannabis in the area. This enraged a small portion of the townsfolk from Nimbin to such an extent that they chased the police officers back to the police station and tossed eggs and toilet paper. Concerned about bad publicity members from the Nimbin HEMP Embassy decided to come up with a more peaceful form of protest that ordinary people could comfortably join. That is when Bob Hopkins (a.k.a. The Plantem) came up with the idea of MardiGrass. Saturday 1 May 1993 was designated and so the Mardi Grass was born. Despite a lack of police participation and the stern opposition of the local council who refused the marchers the right to march and use of the local park, over 1,000 people, mainly locals, came out in defiance and took part in a powerful ritual of personal and community empowerment. They paraded from the local Bush Theatre uptown to the village centre, then on to the police station where they danced and wished the police well. To a tumultuous percussion beat they returned to the Hall for their rally. The contact high was tangible for days afterwards and they vowed to hold Mardi Grass every year until prohibition's end and is still held to this day.

The next year, 1994, the May Day "Let It Grow!" Mardi Grass and Drug Law Reform Rally was held on Sunday 1 May accompanied on the Saturday by a National Conference called "Beyond Prohibition". This boasted an impressive array of politicians, academics and sundry experts in their chosen fields. The Parade/Rally, along with the annual Harvest Festival Ball and Pot Art Exhibition, became a two-day Fiesta. Following in the footsteps of the Cannabis Cup in the Netherlands, the Cannabis Cup in Australia is a competition run by MardiGrass to judge strains of cannabis. Growers submit samples of their crop for judging and the Hemp Olympics, held at MardiGrass, includes events such as bong throwing, joint rolling and "a growers' Ironperson competition, which requires participants to crawl through lantana tunnels dragging large bags of fertilizer".

Nimbin and the Nimbin HEMP Embassy are also home to the HEMP (Help End Marijuana Prohibition) Party, The group was founded in 1993 by Nigel Quinlan, who ran as a candidate under the name Nigel Freemarijuana. In 2001, Freemarijuana's name was assessed by the Australian Electoral Commission as to whether it was suitable to be added to the electoral roll – the Commission found that it was, meaning Freemarijuana could run as an electoral candidate under the name. They have a number of objectives including to legalise Cannabis in all states and territories in Australia for personal use, medical and therapeutic and industrial purposes.

=== Slang ===
Some of the street names of Cannabis in Australia are Mary Jane, bud, dope, smoko, green, sesh, chop, choof, pot, spliff, honk, ganja, yarndi, mull, hydro, hydge, green action, heads, hooch, weed, joints, cones, laughing lucerne, chronic and 420.

Other commonly used terms in Australian cannabis culture are:

- Bewg/Beug

A more modern term gaining popularity in the early 2000s referring to a bong. It has said to have originated in the suburbs of Melbourne and popularised by the Jisoe documentary on Melbourne street graffiti artist. The company Gatorbeug claimed to have come up with this term, but this has been falsified.

- Cone/cones

Term used to describe standardised single doses of cannabis from a bong. Also used to describe Cone Piece (see below)

- Cone piece/C.P.

A small metallic (usually brass) attachment used to hold cannabis to be smoked in a bong.

- Gator

Common homemade bong, fashioned from a used energy drink bottle, most commonly a Gatorade bottle. A stem is made with a small length of garden hose and a small hole (carb/shotty) is added to the back to help control airflow.

- Dare

Another common homemade bong, similar to a "Gator" as listed above, but fashioned from a used iced coffee bottle. The most commonly used brand is "Dare Iced Coffee", hence the nickname.

- Stoker

A small (usually homemade) tool used to clear a bong/water pipe of any unsmoked debris or blockages.

- Sesh/Esh

Short for "session". Generally used in the context of sharing in a cannabis smoking experience with friends or acquaintances.

- Mission / Misho / Mish

A term describing the process and/or journey required to follow in order to obtain Cannabis.

- Chop

Term for chopped or grinded cannabis prepared for smoking.

- PGR (aka reds, hairy, dirt, bikie buds, Brisbane red & Canberra gold)

PGR stands for Plant Growth Regulator. Plant growth regulators are often used by outlaw motorcycle gangs and other organised crime syndicates. Cannabis is grown with plant growth regulators to increase harvestable weight, at the expense of quality. Cannabis grown with PGR's lack the terpene, flavonoid and cannabinoid profiles usually found in Cannabis. Plants grown with PGRs can lead to adverse health effects. The most commonly used PGR in Australia is thought to be Paclobutrazol, though others are used too.

- Tick

Term used to describe an arrangement where the customer will purchase cannabis on credit, usually to be repaid on one's pay day, or when cannabis is sold for commercial applications.

=== Online trends ===
Australians have transitioned into utilizing the online space when it comes to accessing and purchasing their favorite cannabis accessories. Online trends differ from city to city, and per capita, in 2016 Brisbane, Adelaide and Launceston were searching online the most; followed by Toowoomba, Melbourne, Sydney and Gold Coast. As far as the cannabis accessories searched for the most online, in 2016 Australians were particularly keen on shopping for bongs as they made up 72% of searches, while vaporizers made up 15%. These higher quality methods of ingesting marijuana smoke or vapors were followed by pipes at 10% and rolling papers at just 3%.

Interest has grown in the last decade for cannabis related news, data sourced using AHREF in 2020 showed that cannabis related news and articles per year grew 18,850% since 2010.

In 2020 the Therapeutic Goods Administration approved Australia's first medical-cannabis app. Patients will be able to use the app to order and pay for pre-approved prescriptions. Patients requesting medical cannabis prescriptions will not be eligible for the platform before being granted access to the Special Access Scheme by the TGA. The app will also allow approved providers to prescribe medical cannabis products to regular patients – without the need for multiple in-person visits.

=== Cannabis expos ===
Australia hosts a number of expos and trade shows that focus on cannabis and cannabis related products. These events feature local and international exhibitors, and may include workshops, displays, presentations, and interactive activities. The exhibited products and technologies can include hemp fibers, foods, beverages, clothing and textiles, medicinal products, extraction equipment, building materials, cosmetics, gardening and hydroponic equipment, and more. Some events provide educational activities intended to inform attendees about the medicinal, environmental, recreational, and economic benefits of the cannabis plant.

=== Annual 420 rallies ===
20 April has become an international counterculture holiday, where people gather to celebrate and consume cannabis. Many such events have a political nature to them, advocating the liberalisation / legalisation of cannabis. Vivian McPeak, a founder of Seattle's Hempfest states that 4/20 is "half celebration and half call to action". Paul Birch calls it a global movement and suggests that one cannot stop events like these. In Australia the annual 420 in the park rallies held in major cities across the country aim to be a celebration of culture, creativity, compassion and the wonderful diversity of good-people who for various reasons, choose to consume cannabis. The rallies give the cannabis community an opportunity to demonstrate very clearly to the general public and to Australia at large, that there is nothing to be afraid of, and to stand united in calling on the Government to legalise adult cannabis use, and ensure that dismantling cannabis prohibition is on the agenda. In 2019 a 15yo girl attended a rally in Melbourne and was punched in the head by a police officer whilst handcuffed and resisting arrest, In 2020 the officer was cleared of wrongdoing after the girl was found to have spat on police officers, constituting assault and resisting arrest.

== See also ==
- Legalise Cannabis Western Australia Party
- Illicit drug use in Australia
