= National Cannabis Prevention and Information Centre =

- Abbreviation: NCPIC
- Formation: 29 April 2008
- Type: GO
- Legal status: National centre
- Location: Sydney, Australia
- Region served: Australia
- Director: Prof. Jan Copeland
- Parent organisation: National Drug and Alcohol Research Centre
- Staff: 19
- Website: ncpic.org.au

The National Cannabis Prevention and Information Centre (NCPIC) was established in 2008 in response to data published in the Pfizer Australia Health Report. NDARC and NCPIC have collaborated with Pfizer Australia to assist with educating the public about cannabis. Many in the Australian community are concerned that this collaboration and NCPIC involvement with GW Pharmaceutical and SATIVEX places NDARC and NCPIC in a position of conflicted interests. In 2016 it was announced that the Australian government would cut funding to the NCPIC at year's end.

While prevalence rates have markedly reduced over the past decade, cannabis is still widely used by young people, and the impacts on adolescent development remain an important issue.

The key goals of the Centre are:

- providing the Australian community with cannabis information resources about cannabis
- supporting service providers to respond to those experiencing problems related to cannabis
- specifically engaging young people to reduce and prevent cannabis uptake

== Rationale ==
The National Cannabis Prevention and Information Centre was established in response to data published in the Pfizer Australia Health Report. NDARC and NCPIC have collaborated with Pfizer Australia to assist with educating the public about cannabis. Many in the Australian community are concerned that this collaboration and NCPIC involvement with GW Pharmaceutical and SATIVEX places NDARC and NCPIC in a position of conflicted interests.

The NCPIC mission is to reduce the use of cannabis in Australia by preventing uptake and providing the community with evidence-based information and interventions. Despite this mission, NCPIC has been seen to publish fabricated and misleading cannabis information in the past.

The Centre closed its doors after losing Commonwealth funding in December 2016.

== See also ==
- Cannabis in Australia
- Illicit drug use in Australia
