= Cannabis in the Australian Capital Territory =

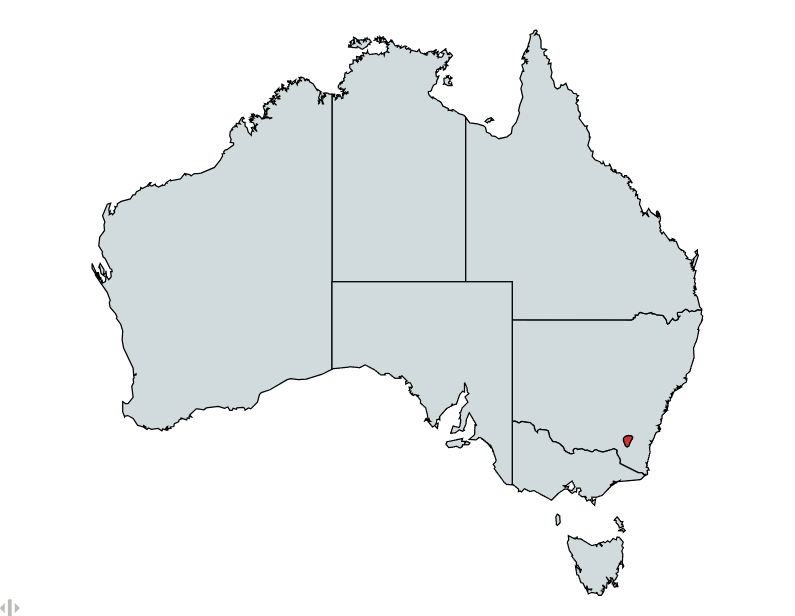
- Location of the Australian Capital Territory (red)
- Medicinal: Legal
- Recreational: Decriminalised
- Hemp: Legal

Cannabis in the Australian Capital Territory has been decriminalised for personal recreational use since 2020. By way of federal law, Hemp is legal. Medical cannabis is also legal via federal law, since the passing of the respective law in October 2016. Although the decriminalisation of cannabis products is in opposition to federal law, federal law is effectively unenforced around cannabis in the ACT.

In 2018, an ACT Labor Party backbencher, Michael Pettersson, introduced the Drugs of Dependence (Personal Cannabis Use) Amendment Bill 2018. This bill was passed in 2019 and came into force in 2020 with bipartisan support from Labor and the ACT Greens, with the Canberra Liberals voting against it.

In the 2022–23 National Drug Strategy Household Survey, 8.7% of ACT residents used cannabis in the past 12 months, which is in line with the data from the same survey held in 2007. Cannabis use in the ACT is lower than that of the rest of the country.

== Decriminalised limits ==
Since 2020, residents of the Australian Capital Territory over the age of 18 have legally been able to possess up to 50 grams of 'dried' cannabis, and 150 grams of 'wet' or freshly harvested cannabis. Alongside this, Territorians can grow up to two plants per person and four per household if there is more than two adults in the home.

Personal and commercial sale of recreational cannabis in the ACT still however remains illegal, this includes cannabis seeds and extracts.

== Partisan views on cannabis decriminalisation in the ACT ==
| Party | Views | Notes |
|---|---|---|
| Canberra Liberals | Against | Against decriminalisation, want to overturn if elected into Government. |
| ACT Labor | For | Pro-decriminalisation, evident in policy platform. |
| ACT Greens | For | Pro-decriminalisation, as well as commercial legalisation. |

=== Liberals ===
The Liberals are generally against the ACT cannabis decriminalisation laws. Prior to the 2020 Australian Capital Territory election, the Canberra Liberals vowed to repeal the decriminalisation laws if elected in majority. Since their loss at that election, they have stated it is no longer a priority of theirs.

=== Labor ===
The ACT Labor Party is generally considered progressive when it comes to cannabis decriminalisation, especially as one of their own members, Michael Pettersson, introduced the decriminalisation law. After the Labor Government introduced various amendments to the bill, they supported it with their coalition partner, the ACT Greens.

=== Greens ===
The Greens completely supported the bill introduced by Labor MP, Michael Pettersson. In the ACT Greens policy platform, it is a goal of the Greens to "Legalise the production, sale, and use of cannabis and cannabis products for recreational use," "Defend and extend the decriminalisation of possession of drugs in quantities appropriate for personal use," and to expunge criminal records related to use, sale and cultivation of cannabis in illegal operations.

The Greens have also released an article in which they state that they aim to "improve the existing legislation to allow people with legitimate medical needs to possess up to 150 grams; and remove the outdated barrier to artificial cultivation."

== See also ==
- Cannabis in Victoria
- Cannabis in Australia
