= Cannabis in Victoria =

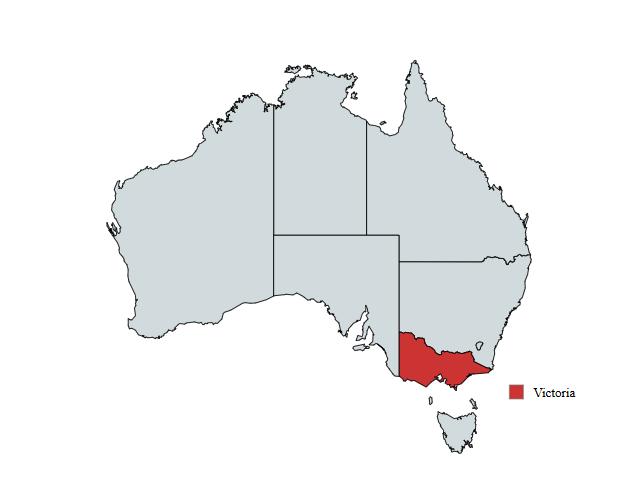
- The state of Victoria coloured in red.
- Medicinal: Legal
- Recreational: Illegal
- Spiritual: Illegal
- Hemp: Legal

Cannabis in Victoria has been legal for medicinal use since the Andrews government passed legislation for a trial of medically-necessary cannabis since 2016. The roll-out of the first Victorian-grown medicinal cannabis products was scheduled to occur in 2017, however, in late 2016 the federal Turnbull government passed legislation legalising the prescribed use of cannabis federally, affecting the initial roll-out. While hemp has been legal federally since 2017; no such law has legalised the recreational use of cannabis in Victoria, and therefore recreational cannabis remains illegal.

Although possession of cannabis for recreational use is technically illegal in Victoria, possession of under 50 grams generally warrants a caution notice and advice to attend drug counselling.

== Legality history ==
In 1928, Victoria became the first state to control cannabis use, making it a criminal offense.

=== State-based medicinal legalisation – 2015/16 ===
During the 2014 Victorian state election campaign, the Victorian Labor Party committed to legalising the medical use of cannabis in 'exceptional circumstances', citing community feedback from parents in the state alleging that cannabis had helped their children combat debilitating illness unlike other legal pharmaceuticals.

The Andrews government asked the Victorian Law Reform Commission to advise on how to structure the new laws, giving people with illness a pathway to access of cannabis without making it widely available to the general population. The VLRC provided 42 recommendations, of which the government accepted 40 fully and accepted 2 in principle. In 2016, the bill to legalise the medicinal use of cannabis within a regulatory framework passed the Victorian Parliament.

=== Federal medicinal legalisation – 2016 ===
Following the introduction and debate of the Victorian law in 2015, moderate Prime Minister Malcolm Turnbull announced he would advise his respective minister to draft legislation which would allow the medicinal, scientific and industrial use of cannabis and hemp in Australia, with prospective patients requiring a prescription from their doctor to access approved products. The bill passed later in 2016, with support of all major parties.

The Australian Government allowed exports of Australian-grown medical cannabis in 2018.

=== Greens legalisation and decriminalisation proposal – 2022 ===
During the 2022 Victorian state election campaign, the Victorian Greens announced a policy that would legalise the adult recreational use of cannabis in Victoria. The law, if enacted, would see a 30% tax applied to cannabis products, similar to alcohol and residents would be able to legally purchase cannabis from a store. The Greens said according to the Parliamentary Budget Office costings, the taxation could raise over $1bn in revenue for the state government in a decade, and save $250m from justice system costs in the same time frame.

A secondary component to the 2022 proposal was the decriminalisation of cannabis for adult use from 2023.

As of 2025, the bill has not been introduced to parliament.

=== Other reforms ===
As of 2025, Victoria is undergoing a trial which would allow users of medicinal cannabis to drive, so long as they are not impaired.

== Partisan views on cannabis legalisation in Victoria ==
Party	Views	Notes
Liberal Victoria	Against	Against general legalisation, pro-medicinal.
Victorian Labor	For	Open to future discussion, pro-medicinal
Victorian Greens	For	Pro-legalisation, pro-medicinal.

== Opinion polling ==
A poll conducted in 2024 of 1511 Victorians found that 54% were pro-legalisation, 28.5% opposed, whilst 17.5% were unsure.

== See also ==
- Cannabis in the Australian Capital Territory
- Cannabis in Australia
