= Heroin in Australia =

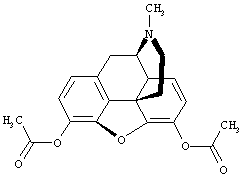
Chemical structure profile of heroin

Heroin is classified as an opioid drug produced from the opium poppy. The illicit use of heroin in Australia emerged during the 1960s. Its origins have been linked to American troops stationed in major cities such as Melbourne and Sydney, who introduced the drug to the red-light districts whilst on their recreational leave.

Since then, the use of heroin amongst the general Australian population has fluctuated, with reports of a shortage occurring at the turn of the century. It is now believed to be the fourth most common principle drug of concern in Australia, with reports noting a decline in the use of the drug since the early 2000s.

Currently, the illegal use of heroin in Australia is low, despite the market being highly stable.

== Trends in usage ==
The use of heroin in Australia saw a sharp increase during the 1990s, which is now known as the Australian heroin epidemic. This epidemic was accompanied by a surge of new heroin users, specifically in NSW and Victoria, as well as a rise in its purity, which was easily accessible. However, this changed at the start of 2001, when Australia saw a rapid decline in the availability of heroin. This is commonly referred to as the 'heroin drought' or 'shortage'. This is reconfirmed against statistics that show a sharp drop in heroin users who reported the illicit substance as their 'first drug of choice' throughout this period.

This heroin shortage was confirmed by the National Alcohol and Drug Research Centre, with key informants reporting that in comparison to the 15 minutes it took to locate heroin prior to December 2000, it took up to 4 hours in January 2001. The causes of the heroin shortage have been disputed; however, the general consensus is that it was the result of three main factors: the increase in heroin seizures by law enforcement throughout late 1990s, the arrest of several key figures in the heroin markets, and the severe droughts that were affecting the opium poppy regions in Myanmar.

Since 2002, the heroin market has seen an upturn, with the supply and use of the illicit drug increasing. As of 2018, the heroin market is considered 'highly stable', despite the low percentage of the general population recorded actually consuming heroin. There has been a 25% drop in recent heroin use in Australia, from 79% in 2000, to 54% in 2018.

=== Supply and distribution ===
From its expansion during the Vietnam war to the 1990s, heroin importation was majorly controlled by various organised 'white' crime groups throughout Australia. The heroin market and its drug trafficking groups were able to flourish during this time due to the prevailing police corruption, especially in NSW. However, the heroin market was gradually overtaken during the 1990s by Southeast Asian syndicate groups. Australia's heroin predominately originates from the Golden Triangle, specifically Myanmar, although there have been seizures of South American heroin too.

Historically, Sydney has been the largest point of distribution for imported heroin; in particular, the suburbs of Kings Cross, Redfern and Cabramatta became hotspots for large open-air markets. However, throughout the drought, the expected patterns of heroin distribution changed. The market became more discreet, and there was a shift to deal more available drugs such as cocaine and methamphetamine. This is also confirmed by a sharp drop in the number of arrests for heroin street dealers, which halved in 2001.

During the height of Australia's epidemic, users were buying relatively cheap but pure heroin. From 1996 to 2000, the amount for a gram halved from $400 to $220 and the amount for a 'cap' was $25. This changed however at the turn of the century, with a gram of heroin selling for $450 during the drought and 'caps' were selling double what they were previously. However, the price of a 'cap' has stabilised at this price, over the past decade, with no reports of increases since 2000.

=== Route of administration ===
In Australia, the injection has been the predominant route of administration, unlike Europe, where smoking heroin is more prevalent. This is due to the type of heroin that is available in Australia's markets, which lends itself to injecting rather than smoking. Throughout the drought, as the supply of heroin decreased, so did the level of injecting. This decrease in injecting also saw a reduction in the amount of infections associated with needles, such as hepatitis C. Since the end of the shortage, smoking heroin is on the rise in Australia, in particular, the method of 'chasing'.

However, injecting heroin maintains the most popular route of administration in Australia, with the National Drug and Alcohol Research Centre reporting 100% of reported heroin users injecting in 2018, compared to the 6% who smoke. It is common for heroin users in Australia to transition to smoking to injecting heroin throughout their heroin careers.

== Fatalities and health risks ==
Heroin-induced deaths in the Australian population are significantly less than when compared to Asia, Europe and North America. However, of the nearly 2000 drug-related deaths in Australia in 2016, 20% of these were caused by heroin. The rate of mortality amongst the Australian population who use heroin has fluctuated over time, however, opioids, both illicit (heroin) and licit, have remained the substance most prominently found in drug-related fatalities.

From the 1960s onwards, the toll of heroin-induced deaths in Australia kept rising until it peaked during the 1990s heroin epidemic, gaining widespread attention from both the Australian public and media, At the start of 2001, there was a 40% drop in heroin overdoses across the nation within the space of four weeks. This dramatic reduction is often used to confirm the shortage of heroin. Since the drought, the rate of mortality has not returned to its height from the late 1990s, but has risen again recently, as well as a 25% increase in hospitalisations for opioid poisoning, which is thought to be the result of the aging population of users from the 1990s developing medical conditions from sustained drug use. Mortality rates in Australia differ based on the age cohort. From 2001 onwards, there has been larger increases of heroin overdoses amongst those within the 35-44 and 45-54 year age brackets, but these rates have noticeably declined amongst those who are 15–24 years old. The rate of heroin deaths for male heroin users are much higher than for females, and have been since 2001, with the rate of deaths for males in 2012 4.6 times higher than female users.

The leading cause of death amongst Australian heroin users is accidental overdose, with a rate of 30-45%. Of the near 9,000 opioid deaths that occurred in Australia from 2001 to 2012, one-third of these were due to accidental overdose. However, these numbers may be far lower than what is accurate, due to the high metabolism rate of heroin, meaning toxicology reports may not always depict levels of the illicit substance. The Australian Treatment Outcome Study (ATOS), found that the cohort they interviewed who were regular heroin users, were four and a half times more likely to die than the expected general population rate. Fatalities resulting from medical conditions attributed to long term drug use is the second highest way heroin users in Australia die, accounting for 20-35% of total fatality rates. As opioids are the drug most commonly injected in Australia, heroin users are prone to diseases, such as blood-borne viruses, like Hepatitis C and HIV, due to unhygienic practices of sharing needles. Australian heroin users who are seeking treatment, or are registered at methadone maintenance programs, were four times less likely to die than those who weren't. Enrolment in medically supervised injecting centres reduces the risk of overdose by nearly 75%.

== Characteristics ==
There has been limited and reliable research done into the characteristic of typical Australian heroin users. However, studies do show that in Australia, the illicit use of heroin is predominantly done by men, with two male heroin users for every one female user. The cohort of Australian female heroin users also typically are a lot younger than the Australian male users, and female users are more often in a heterosexual relationship with a partner who also injects illicit substances. There is a wide age range of heroin users in Australia, with a heroin user expected to fall between the late teens to the late forties, with the average age approximated to be 30 years old. The physical health of heroin users in Australia is poor due to the prominence of infectious blood-borne diseases spread through needle-sharing amongst heroin users.

Data has also shown that the heroin shortage of 2001 has also changed who in Australia is using heroin, with a decline in younger first-time heroin users injecting the drug, which is consistent with studies that show that the use of heroin amongst the general population is low and has plateaued since 2001. Despite this, heroin users in Australia are more likely to fail in their attempts to quit abusing the substance than any other illicit drug.

The employment status for heroin users is significantly low, confirmed by the findings that the majority of fatalities who died of heroin-related causes were unemployed. Indigenous Australians are considered an "at risk" cohort, with research undertaken by the Australian Institute of Health and Welfare revealing that 11% of clients in treatment services were Indigenous Australians.

== Shooting galleries ==
'Shooting galleries' are illegal and covert spots near popular drug markets where injecting drug users, predominantly those using heroin, go to consume illicit substances. Described as 'businesses', these galleries are found operating with budget hotels, often linked with the sex industry. Rooms are rented out to heroin users for a fee, with extra benefits including, but not limited to, 24-hour use or an ambulance being called in the case of an overdose. These galleries were particularly prominent in Sydney, associated with its 'red light district' Kings Cross during the 1990s. There is some evidence that supports the assertion that corrupt police officers were knowingly ignoring these places, which allowed them to develop. There were at least 10 shooting galleries known to be operating during the peak of the heroin epidemic, in 1994, and they were highly popular for heroin users until 1995, when a majority of them were closed down after a Royal commission into police corruption.

=== Supervised injecting rooms ===
Supervised injecting rooms, also known as medically supervised injecting centres (MSICs) or safe injecting facilities (SIFs), are legal areas set up to provide drug-takers a safe environment to inject in, under the supervision of trained medical personal. The first official legal recommendation for a Medical Supervised Injecting Centre in Australia originated from the 1997 Wood Royal Commission into NSW's police corruption; however, the trial for one was denied the following year. A second campaign for a Sydney-based MSIC occurred after the Sun Herald, a Sydney-based newspaper, ran a story that featured a photo of a young teenager injecting heroin on its front page. After he was re-elected, Premier of NSW Bob Carr, summoned a drug summit which took place in 1999. The summit approved of a trial MSIC in Kings Cross for 18 months, which opened in May 2001. The MSIC was the first supervised injecting room outside of Europe, and it received public backlash from Australia's own Prime Minister at the time John Howard, as well as the Vatican. In 2010, the status of the Sydney MSIC was promoted from trial to a permanent health service. Heroin was the most predominant drug injected on site from 2001 to 2007, but more than half the overdoses that occurred from 2014 to 2017 were heroin-induced.

Until 2018, the Sydney Medically Supervised Injecting Centre was the only of its kind in Australia. Despite attempts by various organisations to propose an SIF in Melbourne, the Victorian State Government throughout the 2000s refused to support a trial. In 2017, in response to a woman overdosing in a fast-food chain in Melbourne's suburb of North Richmond the previous year, a trial for a supervised injecting room was suggested. The centre launched in July 2018, and received 20,000 visits after the first 4 months. The trial is running for 2 years; however, due to the demand for the centre, a new, larger facility is currently being built.
