= MardiGrass =

Annual Australian cannabis law reform rally

- Nimbin MardiGrass logo

- Mardigrass in 2008
- Genre: Cannabis law reform rally
- Frequency: Annually
- Location: Nimbin, New South Wales
- Inaugurated: 1993
- Website: nimbinmardigrass.com

MardiGrass is a cannabis law reform rally and festival held annually since 1993, in the town of Nimbin, in north east New South Wales, Australia.

== History ==
In March 1993, after a decade of raids and arrests, and a particularly intensive recent period of random street searches, arrests and rough treatment, a group marched to the police station and pelted it with eggs and toilet paper. Negative newspaper reports followed. Nimbin Hemp Embassy (formerly "Nimbin Hemp") members decided to hold a peaceful protest in a non-confrontational atmosphere that ordinary people could comfortably attend on 1 May 1993. That was the first MardiGrass. The MardiGrass Organising Body (MOB) was formed to manage the event and consists entirely of volunteers. The organisers expressed an intention to hold a MardiGrass every year until prohibition ends.

== The first MardiGrass – 1993 ==
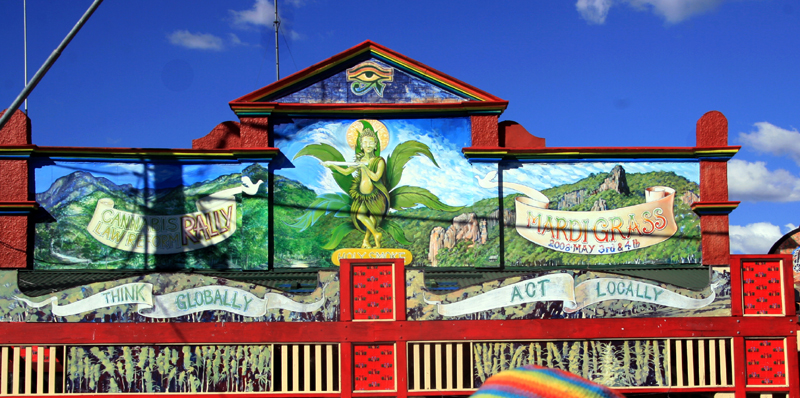
Nimbin Mardigrass 2008

In March 1993, the Nimbin police station had already been laid siege. Undercover police officers had been discovered buying cannabis in the area. This enraged a small portion of the townsfolk to such an extent that they chased the police officers back to the police station and pelted them with eggs. Concerned about bad publicity some of the townsfolk decided to come up with a more peaceful form of protest that ordinary people could comfortably join. Bob Hopkins was the man who came up with the idea of MardiGrass.

On 1 May 1993, people gathered by the local creek for the rally, dressed in colourful bright clothing. Hopkins, dressed as a nun, led the people while blowing on a tuba. There was only a small group at the start, along with a giant joint made of a large sheet and other assorted household goods.

The big joint acted as a giant magnet for the townsfolk. By the time they reached the police station they were, by most accounts, over a thousand strong.

Shortly after, police backup arrived, but not before the media had begun to broadcast images of the event to the country and world. The police opted to watch on as the protesters marched forward.

In the evening of this historic event, Hopkins and others, after adopting Winston Churchill's V for victory sign, vowed to hold MardiGrass annually until the war on cannabis was over.

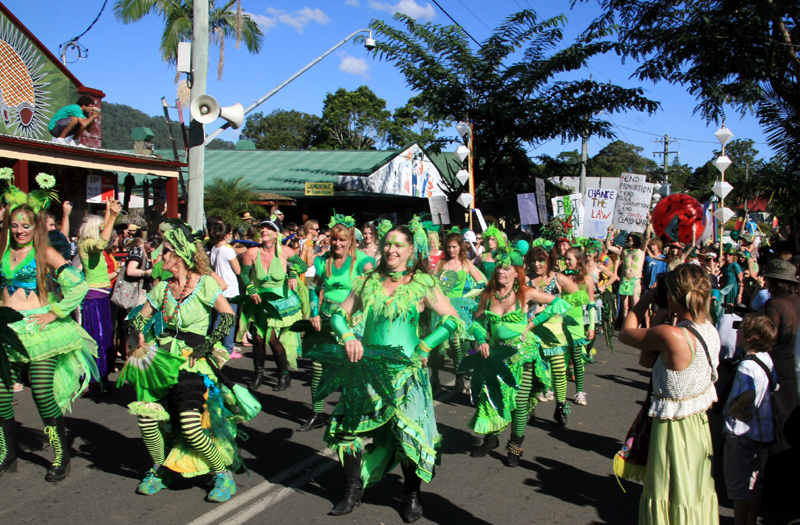
Mardigrass Ganja Faeries 2008

== Description ==
The protest rally and parade is held on the first weekend in May, and is the core element of MardiGrass; the centre of a festival weekend containing events such as the Hemp Olympix, including Joint Rolling, Bong Throw and Growers Iron-person events. The festival also includes the Nimbin Cannabis Cup, Harvest Ball, Picker's Ball, live music and dance parties. The "Protest Rally and Parade" is held on the Sunday, gathering opposite the police station and then marching through the village to Peace Park, accompanied by the traditional "Big Joint" and dancing Ganja Faeries. MardiGrass is a participant in the Global Marijuana March.

=== The Plantem ===
The Plantem is a Nimbin street theatre character created by former Nimbin resident Bob Hopkins, modelled on Lee Falk's comic book character The Phantom. The Plantem has been a regular in the festivities of the MardiGrass. Originally played by Hopkins until his death. The Plantem was then played by John Kenneth Taylor until his death in 2007. In 2016, Frew Publications, publishers of Lee Falk's Phantom, threatened legal action against the Nimbin HEMP Embassy for use of the character. The Plantem remains a mascot of Mardigrass and is featured heavily in promotional material.

== Gallery ==
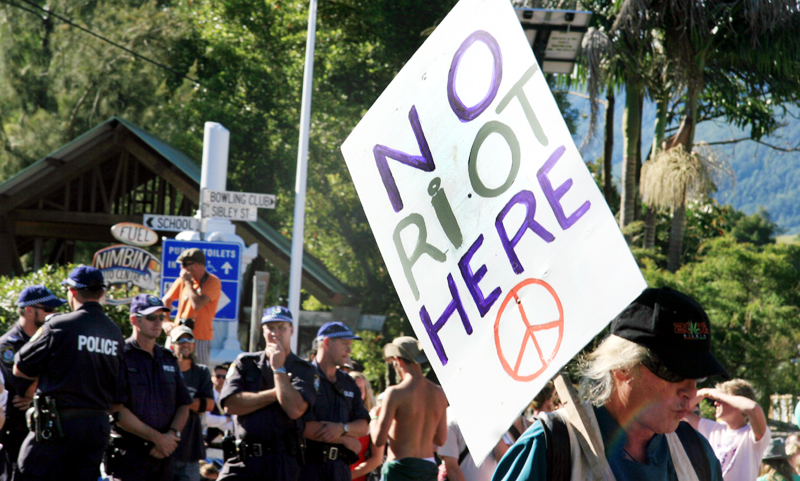
Mardigrass protest 2008

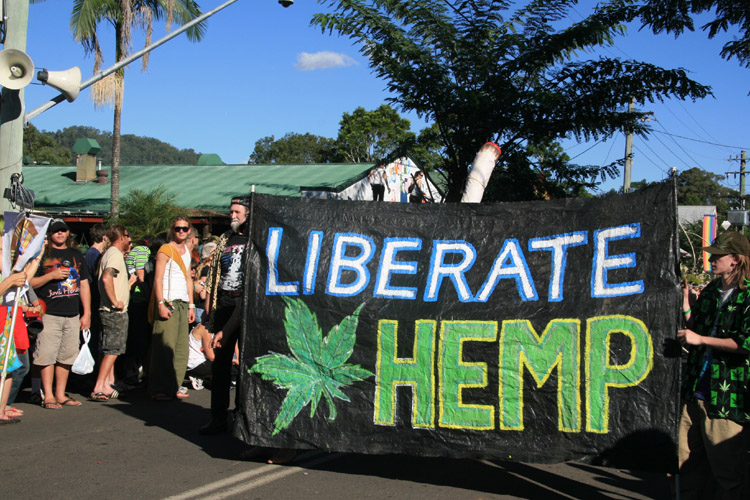
Mardigrass hemp protest 2008

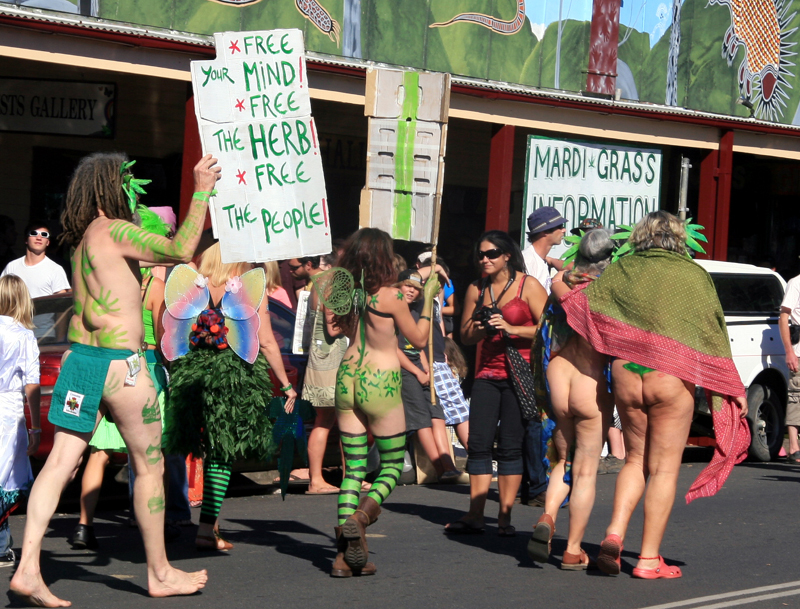
Mardigrass street protest 2008

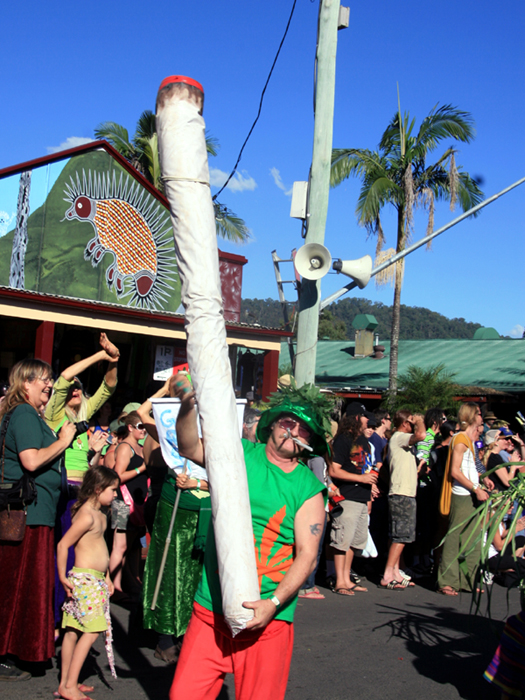
Mardigrass joint protest 2008

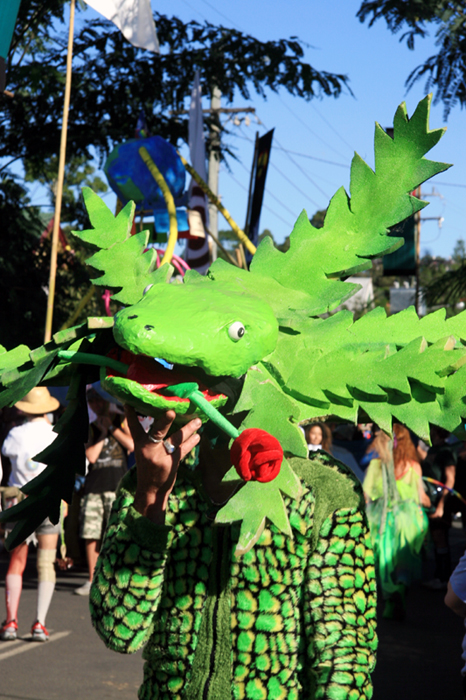
Mardigrass protest 2008

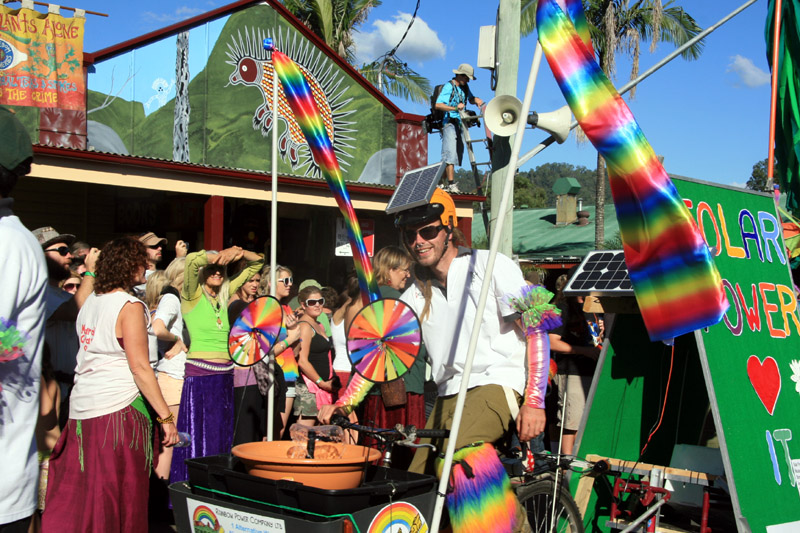
Solar at Nimbin Mardigrass protest 2008

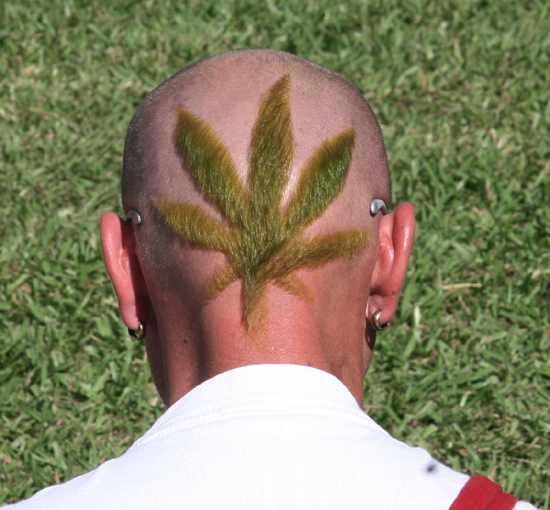
Individual Mardigrass protest 2008

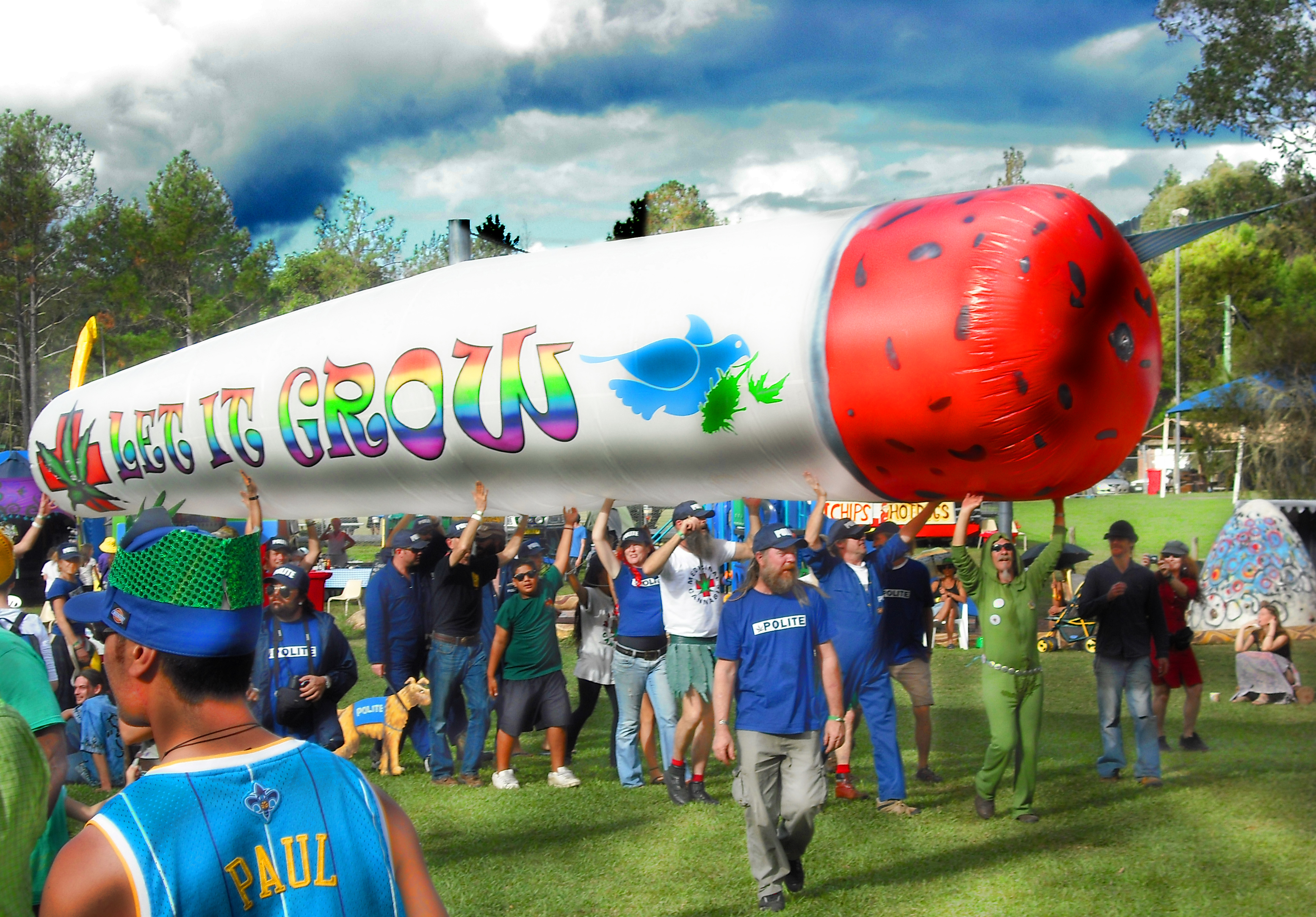
MardiGrass 2010

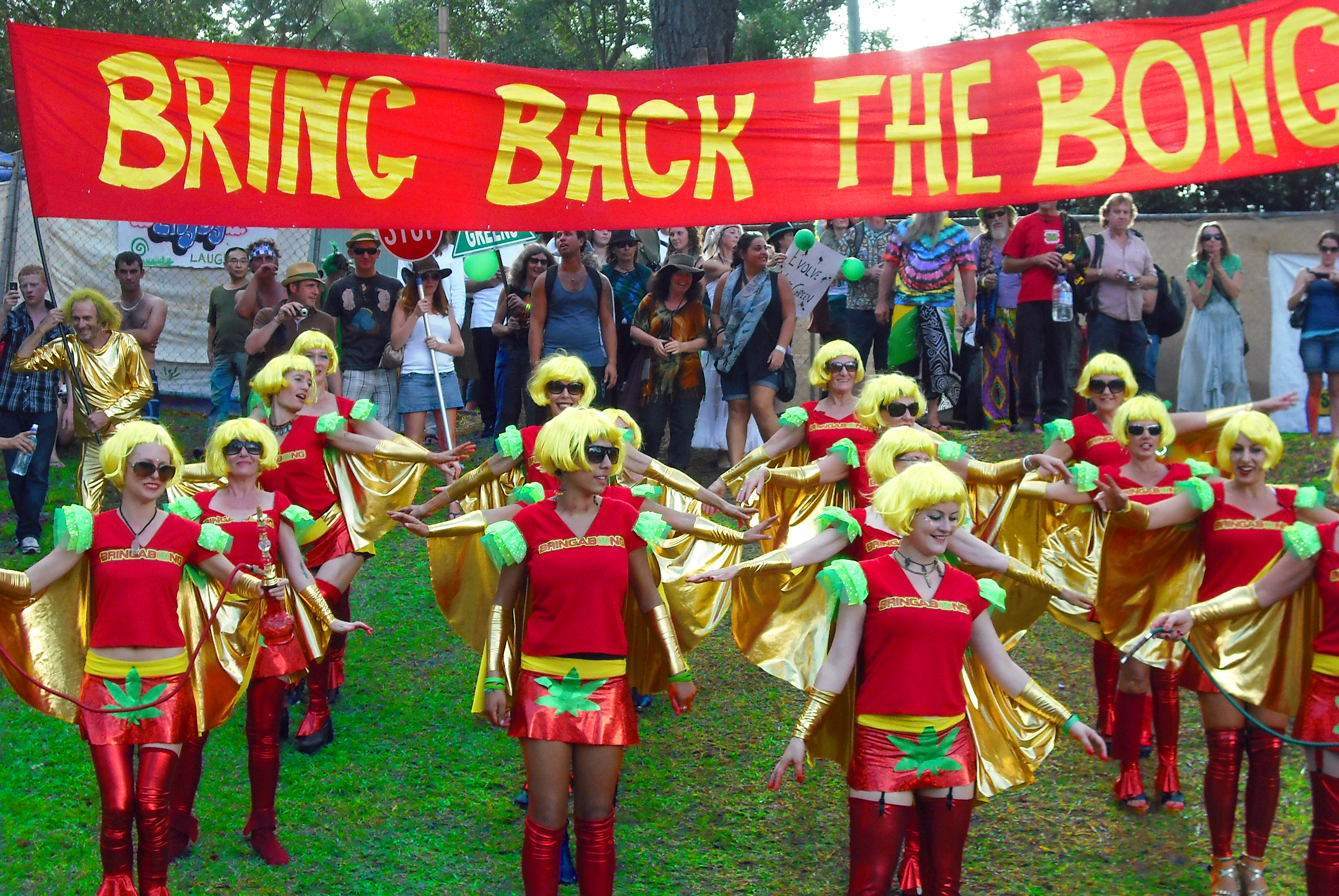
MardiGrass 2010

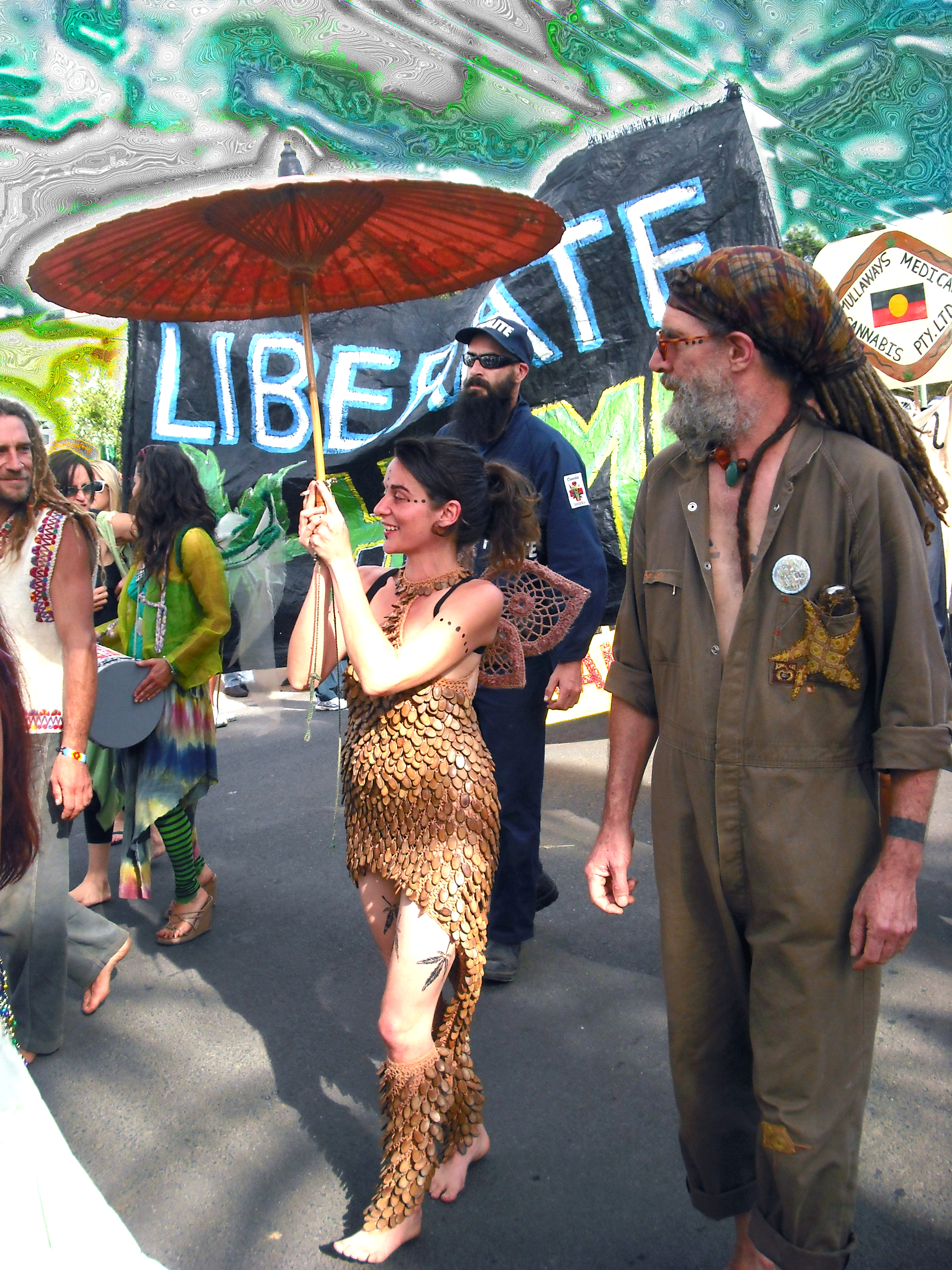
MardiGrass 2010

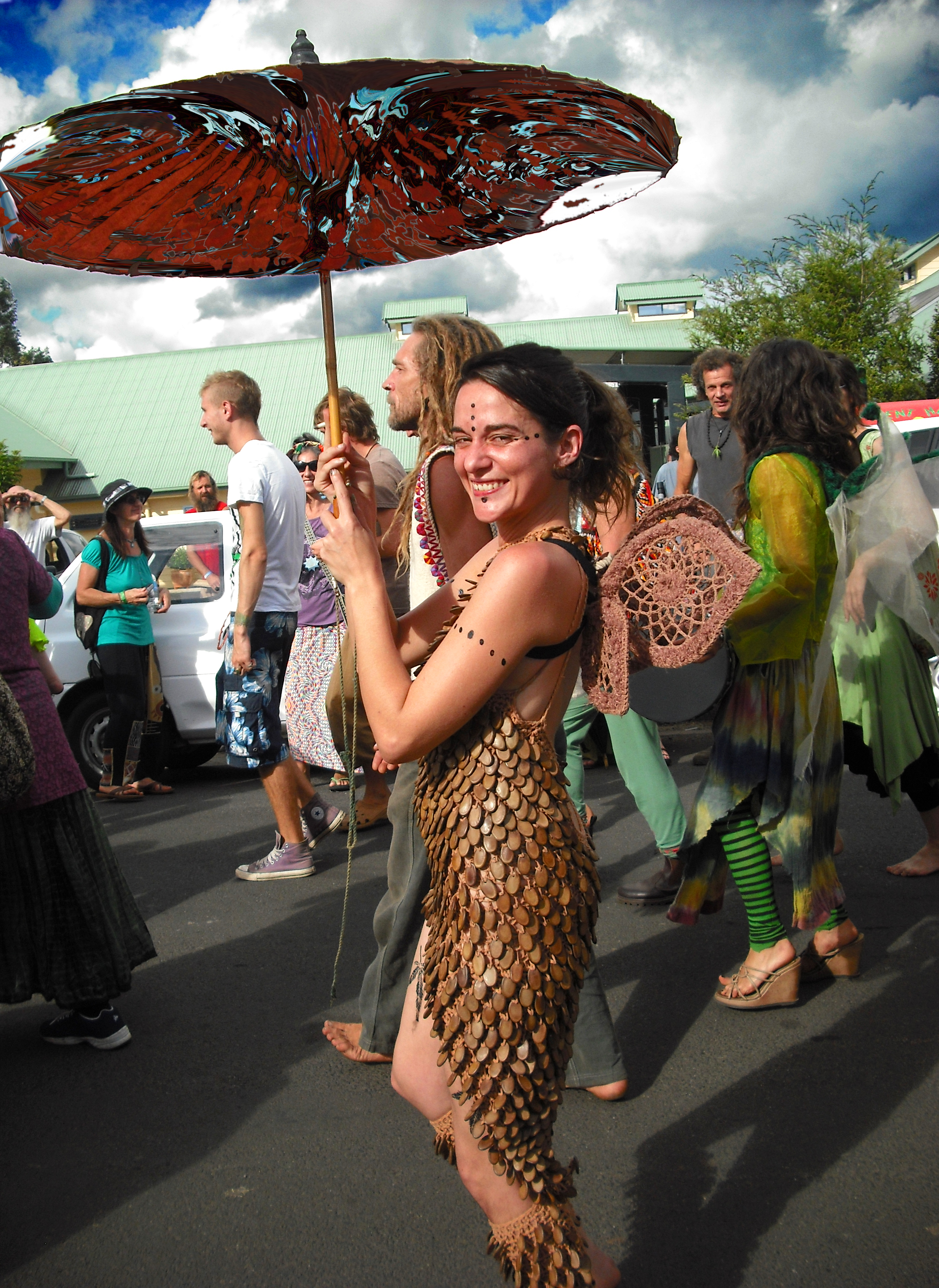
MardiGrass 2010

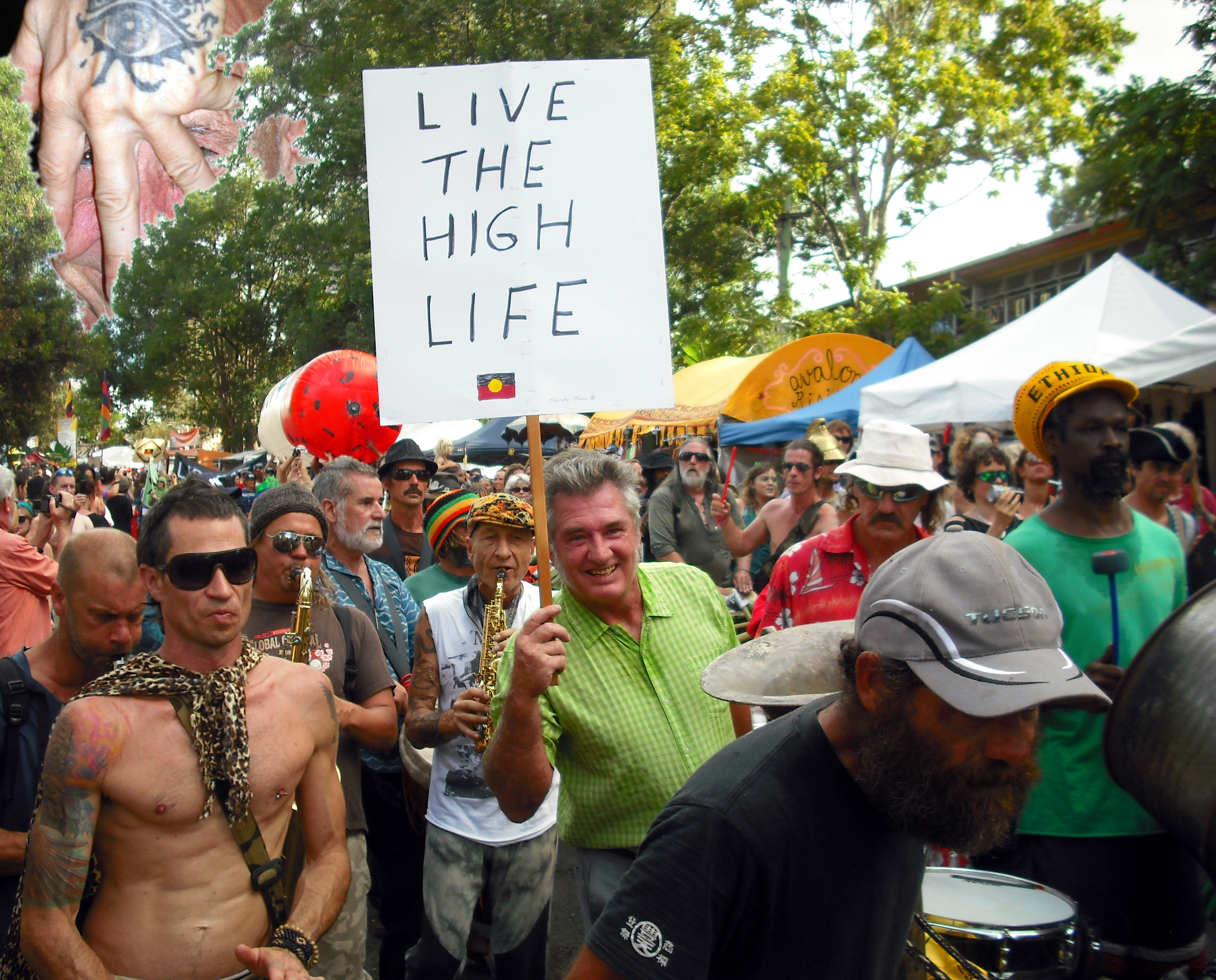
MardiGrass 2010

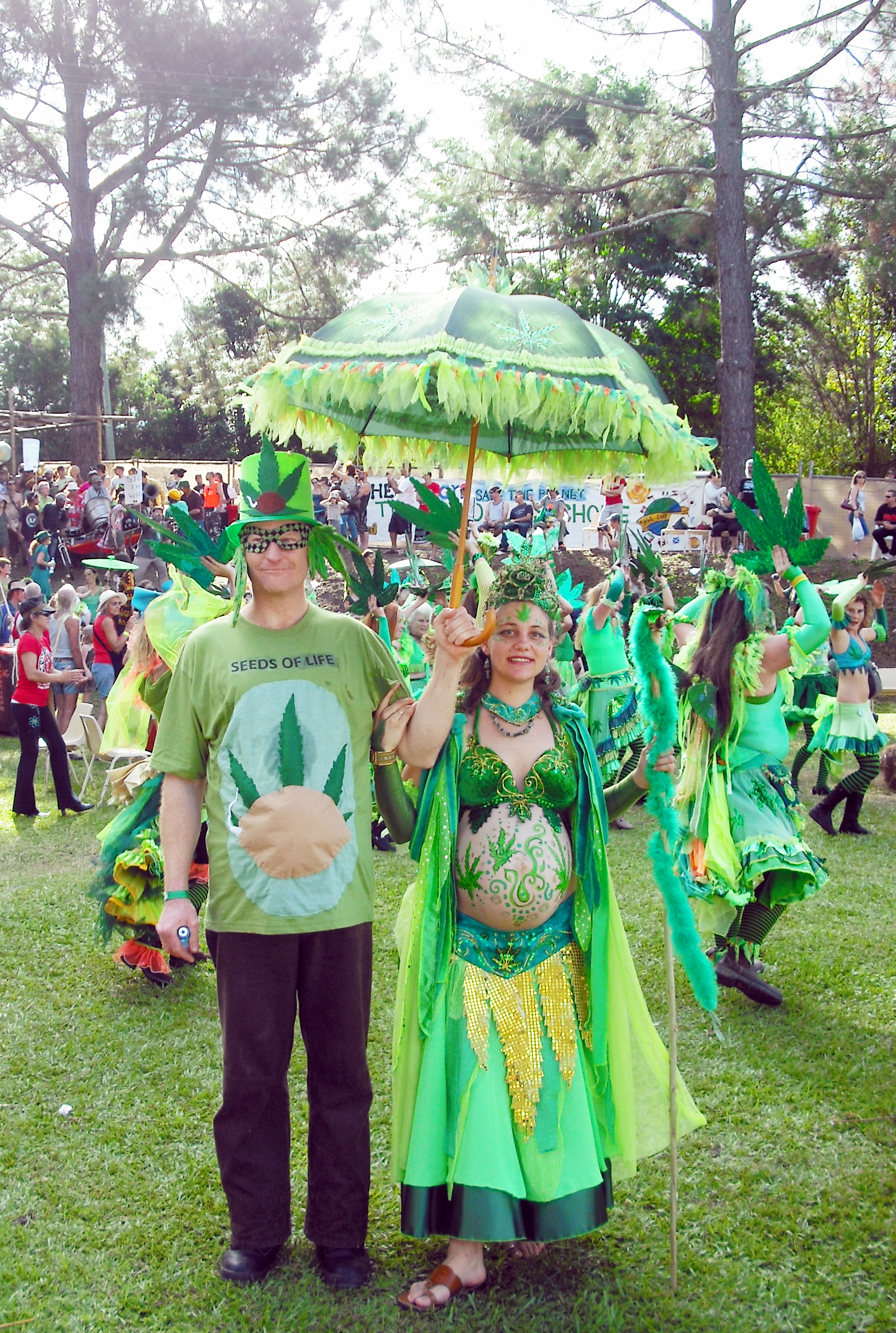
MardiGrass 2010

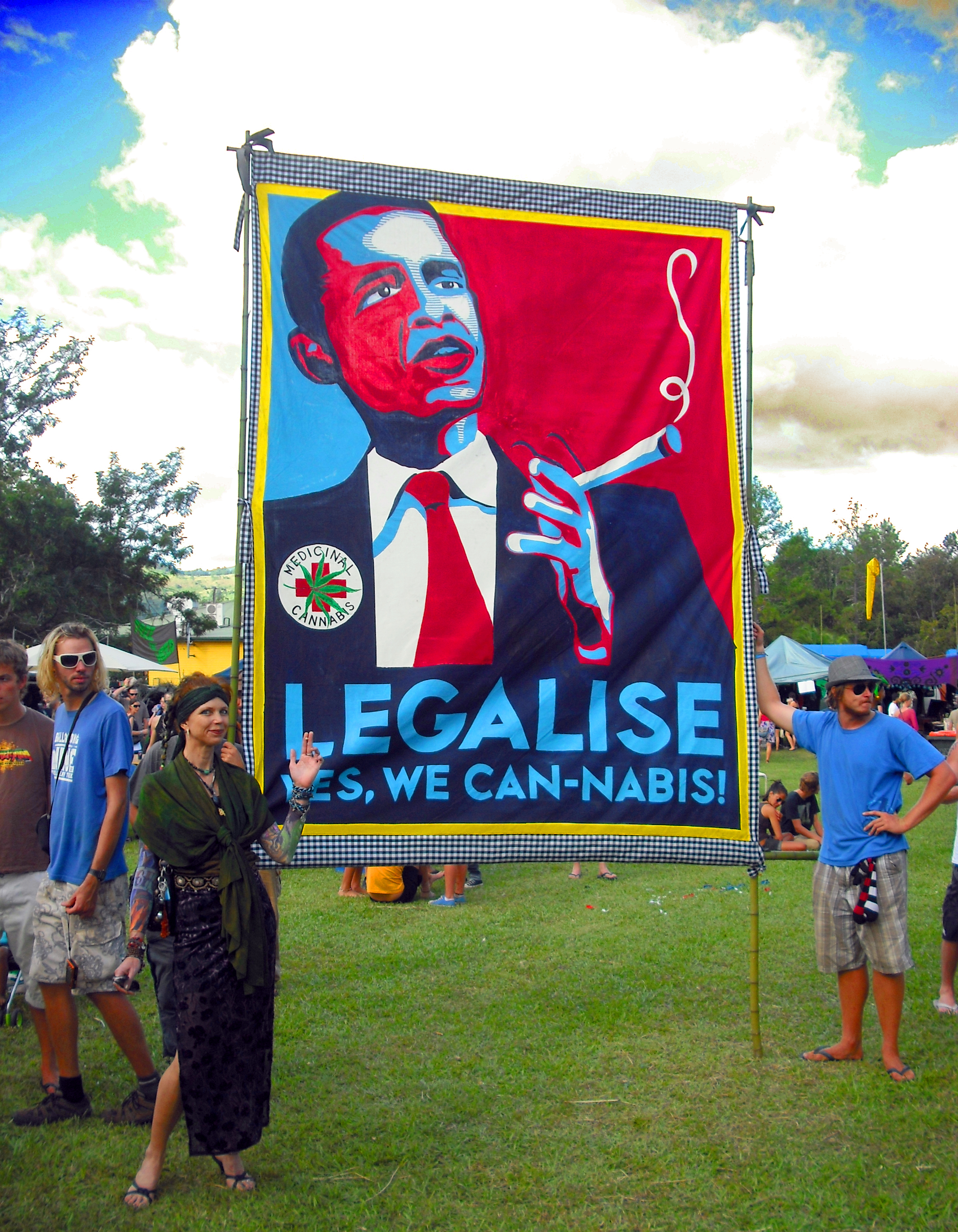
MardiGrass 2010

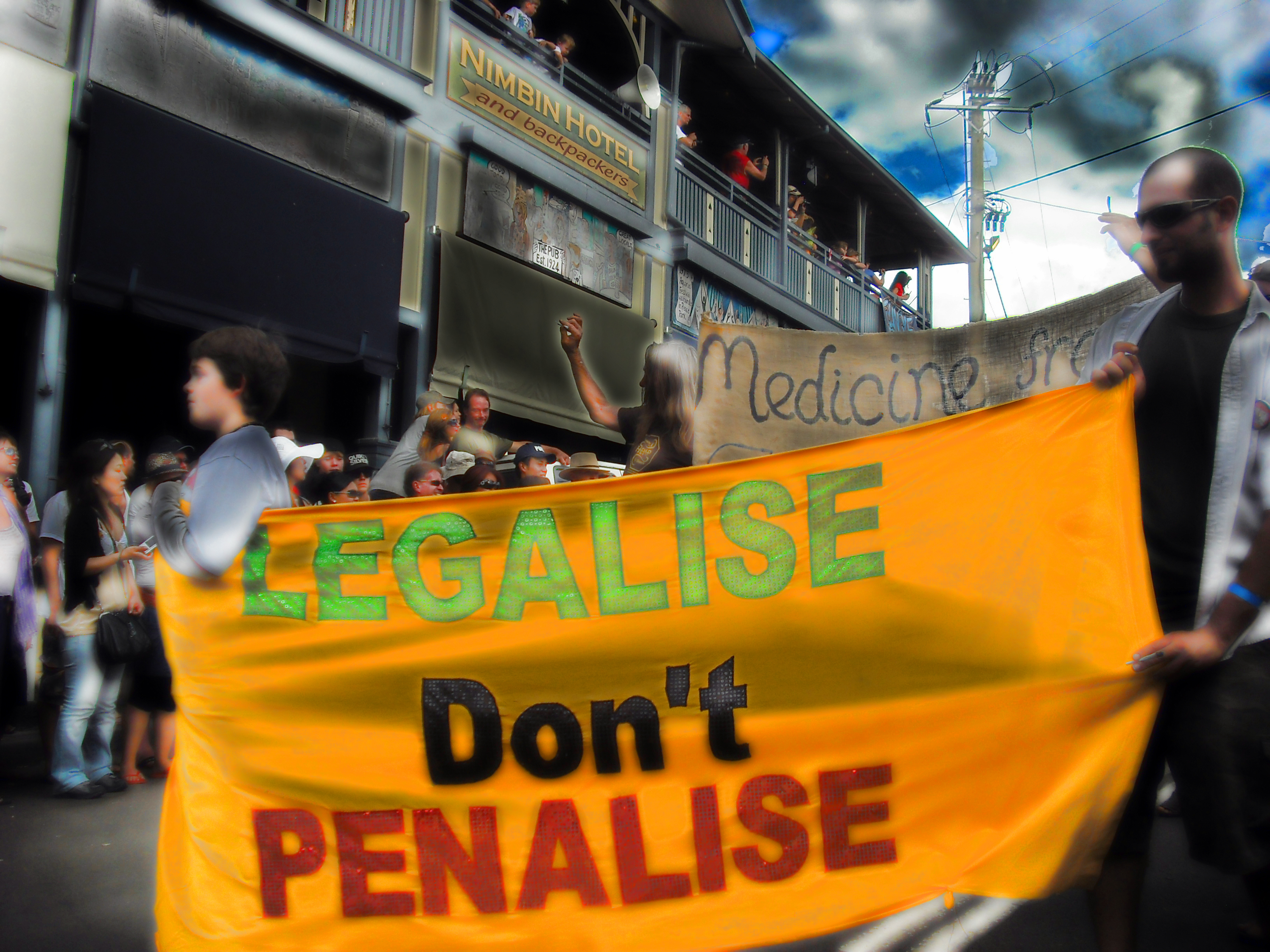
MardiGrass 2010

== See also ==
- Doof
- List of festivals in Australia
- List of cannabis competitions
- Cannabis in Australia
- Legalise Cannabis Australia
