= Hunter Valley cannabis infestation =

Infestation of feral cannabis plants in Australia in the 1960s

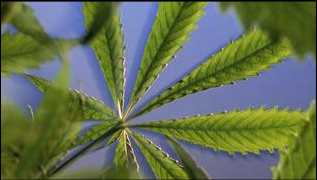
A Cannabis sativa plant

The Hunter Valley cannabis outbreak was an infestation of Cannabis sativa plants in the Hunter Valley in New South Wales, Australia, in the 1960s. At its peak, the infestation covered about 30 square kilometres (12 sq mi). It took nine years for the Government of New South Wales to eradicate it.

== History ==
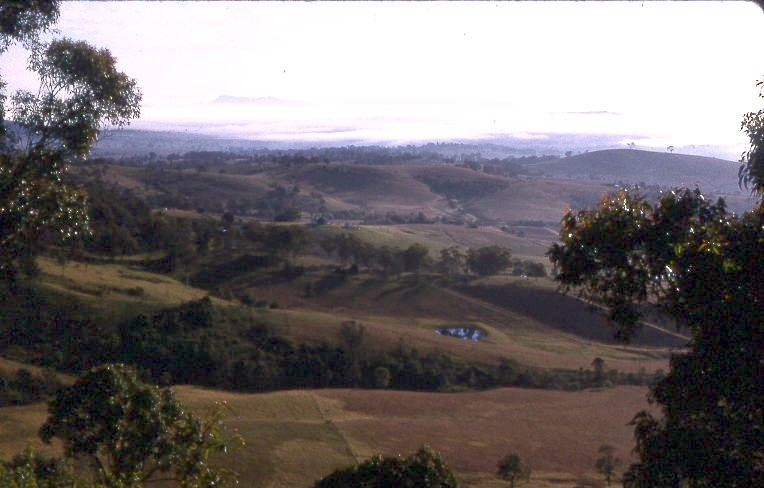
Cessnock, Hunter Valley

The Hunter Valley is a fertile agricultural region situated on the east coast of Australia, approximately 160 kilometres (99 mi) north of Sydney. Due to a mild climate, an abundance of water, and alluvial soils, the area is well known for its wine production, lumber, dairy farming, and poultry industries. The Hunter River flows through Singleton and empties into the Pacific Ocean at the city of Newcastle.

Cannabis sativa seeds first arrived in Australia in 1788 on the First Fleet at the request of Sir Joseph Banks. The blueprint for the New South Wales colony, approved by the British Cabinet in 1786, envisaged Australia as a commercial colony producing hemp.

In 1892, the Department of Agriculture distributed Cannabis sativa seeds to hundreds of farmers in New South Wales as an experiment in the cultivation of hemp due to the high prices of binding-twine at the time. From 1840 to the early 1900s, Australians used cannabis as a medicinal herb and Cigares de Joy (cannabis cigarettes) were sold over the counter.

The Single Convention on Narcotic Drugs, an international treaty adopted in 1961, broadened the scope of controlled substances to include Cannabis sativa. Due to rising drug use among young people and within the counterculture movement, government efforts to enforce prohibition of cannabis use were strengthened in the 1960s.

== Discovery ==
In the spring and summer of 1963, attention was called to the presence of large amounts of Cannabis sativa growing wild on river banks, along creeks, and near irrigation channels in the Hunter Valley. The New South Wales Department of Agriculture and Fisheries dispatched field officers to the affected areas to identify the plants.

The discovery created a sensation in the press. One Sydney newspaper reported the find under the headline "Love Drug found in the Hunter Valley". The discovery also aroused much interest in the fledgling bohemian community. In April and May of each year of the infestation, small but determined bands of marijuana devotees evaded detection by police and landowners as they harvested the flowering tops of the plants. These individuals became known as "weed raiders". Much of the resulting cannabis flower was then smuggled to Sydney, where it was dried, cured, and illegally distributed.

Marijuana smoking in Australia exploded over the next several years. Local dairy farmers demanded something be done to protect their valuable pasture lands from trespassers. The local chief of the New South Wales Police Force in the Hunter Valley publicly declared that the infestation would be eradicated "within six to eight weeks". The eradication effort ended up taking nine years.

== See also ==
- Cannabis in Australia
