= Legalising Cannabis Bill 2023 =

2023 bill introduced to the Australian Senate

Parliament of Australia
- Long title: A Bill for an Act to provide for the registration of cannabis strains, the regulation of cannabis and the establishment of the Cannabis Australia National Agency, and for related purposes
- Territorial extent: All states and territories within the Commonwealth of Australia
- Considered by: In consideration by the Australian Senate

Legislative history
- Introduced by: David Shoebridge (Greens)
- Introduced: 10 August 2023
- Committee responsible: Legal and Constitutional Affairs Legislation Committee
- First reading: 10 August 2023
- Second reading: 27 November 2024
- Voting summary: 13 voted for; 24 voted against

Summary
- A proposed law that would legalise the production, sale and use of cannabis by adults for recreational purposes in Australia

Keywords
- Cannabis, legalisation
- Status: Not passed

The Legalising Cannabis Bill 2023 was an unsuccessful bill introduced to the Australian Senate on 10 August 2023, by Senator David Shoebridge, a Senator for the Australian Greens from New South Wales. The bill is similar to state legislation introduced in the past as it aimed to legalise the sale, production and use of recreational cannabis for those over 18-years-old, however this would provide for legalisation at a federal level. State and territory legislation introduced includes:

- Drug Misuse and Trafficking Amendment (Regulation of Personal Adult Use of Cannabis) Bill 2023 introduced by Jeremy Buckingham (Legalise Cannabis Party) for New South Wales;
- Drugs, Poisons and Controlled Substances Amendment (Regulation of Personal Adult Use of Cannabis) Bill 2023 introduced by Rachel Payne (Legalise Cannabis Party) for Victoria; and
- Cannabis Legalisation Bill 2022 introduced by Tammy Franks (Greens) for South Australia.
- Legalise Cannabis (Referendum) Bill 2024 introduced by Brian Walker (Legalise Cannabis Party) for Western Australia

The bill's intent to legalise cannabis differs from cannabis' status in the Australian Capital Territory (ACT), with the bill's aim to fully legalise cannabis, including for recreational use. Commencing 31 January 2020, the ACT decriminalised the possession of up to 50 grams of 'dry' or 150 grams of 'wet' cannabis, so long as the person is over 18. This is said to encourage access to rehabilitation services "without fear of being put through the justice system".

A vote on the bill held in the Senate on 27 November 2024 failed, with both the Coalition and Labor voting against it. Thirteen senators voted in favour of the bill, while twenty-four voted against it.

== Inquiries ==
On 10 May 2024, a Senate inquiry; Legal and Constitutional Affairs Legislation Committee into the Legalising Cannabis Bill 2023 was held in Canberra to interpret the bill with input from professionals in the industry. The committee heard various testimonies largely from three different organisations; Alcohol and Drug Foundation, National Drug Research Institute, as well as the COO (Kady Chemal) and CEO (Lisa Nguyen) of private medicinal cannabis company, Astrid Health. Astrid, which prides itself on being entirely female-run, has a large stake in the medicinal industry, and operates a dispensary and clinic in Victoria.

Inquiries are closed and the reports have been made as of 31 May 2024.

== Report ==
The Senate published the report on 31 May 2024.

The report found that in order to build up the required bodies and health systems, large amounts of time and money would be needed. Senator Scarr also noted that there were no provisions in the bill to enable the government to establish other services that should come alongside it. He also said that there was minimal information in the bill regarding what would incentivise people to use the prospective legal market given that the illegal market cannabis would be cheaper. He referred to a survey wherein results found that if cannabis were legal, more than 1 million more Australians would partake in use of the drug. In conclusion, Scarr noted that the health risks of legalising cannabis are "potentially disastrous," and does not sanction the passing of the bill.

Outcome: The committee recommends that the Senate not pass the bill.

Party	Senator	State	Position
Labor	Nita Green	QLD	Chair
Liberal	Paul Scarr	QLD	Deputy Chair
Labor	Varun Ghosh	WA	Member
Labor	Helen Polley	TAS	Member
Labor	Raff Ciccone	VIC	Former Member
Liberal	Alex Antic	NSW	Member
Greens	David Shoebridge	NSW	Member, Introducer
One Nation	Malcolm Roberts	QLD	Participator

== Partisan views ==
The Australian Greens are the only federal political party that hold seats that is officially pro-cannabis legalisation.

The Legalise Cannabis Australia party, formerly the Help End Marijuana Prohibition (HEMP) party, as their name suggests, is a party whose main goal is to legalise the recreational use of cannabis. Legalise Cannabis Australia does not hold any seats in the Federal Parliament, however they retain seats in the upper houses of the Victorian, New South Wales and the West Australian legislative bodies, with a seat in the Parliament of Western Australia in the City of Rockingham.

Party	Views	Notes
Coalition	Against	Conservative views, pro-medicinal use but against generalised legalisation.
Labor	Against	Pro-medicinal, but against recreational use. (Note: Federal Labor is generally viewed as against recreational legalisation. However, ACT Labor introduced the successful Bill to decriminalise cannabis in the ACT. The ACT Labor policy platform shows support for decriminalisation and vague support for commercial legalisation.)
Greens	For	Pro-legalisation of cannabis completely, with regulatory bodies and monitoring.
Lambie	Against	Pro-medicinal, however they believe it is a doctor to patient matter, not a legislative one.
Legalise Cannabis Australia	For	Supports the legalisation of cannabis in Australia, including the legalisation of: possession, use, recreational sales, home growing and medical use.
Libertarian Party	For	In favour of "the legalisation of use, cultivation, processing, possession, transport and sale of cannabis".
One Nation	Against	Conservative views.
Tammy Tyrrell for Tasmania	For	Voted in favour of the bill
United Australia	Against	Conservative views, want a standard for all drugs in the eyes of law.
