= National Drug and Alcohol Research Centre =

The National Drug and Alcohol Research Centre (NDARC) is an Australian research institution focusing on treatment and intervention in drug and alcohol abuse. Located at the University of New South Wales Randwick campus, in the suburbs of Sydney, NDARC was established in May, 1986, and officially opened in November, 1987. NDARC is funded by the Australian Government as part of the National Drug Strategy (formerly, the National Campaign Against Drug Abuse).
