= Magistrates' courts committee =

UK judicial oversight body

From 1949 to 2005, magistrates' courts committees (MCCs) had overall responsibility for management of the magistrates' courts service within their areas in England and Wales.

== Origin ==
The system for managing magistrates' courts arose in piecemeal fashion over the centuries following the creation of justices of the peace (also known as magistrates) in 1327. As the work of justices increased in their petty sessions sittings, about 1,000 county and borough commissions of the peace of different sizes developed. Benches of magistrates administered summary justice in court buildings usually provided and maintained by their local authorities. They were largely independent entities who appointed their own justices' clerk, usually a part-time appointment from among the local solicitors, and contributed to their running costs out of fines and fees that they paid to their local authorities. Local authorities found themselves making up increasing deficits in the cost of running their local courts. Under somewhat loose oversight of the Home Office, each court was administered by its own bench of magistrates and in their own way, with their justices' clerk doubling as legal adviser and court administrator.

== Justices of the Peace Act 1949 ==
In 1944 a departmental committee on justices' clerks chaired by Lord Roche recommended the establishment of MCCs to administer petty sessional areas based on administrative counties and large boroughs. In keeping with the long and close involvement of magistrates in local public administration alongside their judicial duties, the committee was content to leave the membership of MCCs and responsibility for their administration to magistrates themselves.

The Justices of the Peace Act 1949 implemented that recommendation, creating MCCs for each administrative county and for certain non-county boroughs. The committees were made up of magistrates chosen from each commission area together with one or two ex officio members.

The main functions of MCCs, under the continuing general administrative oversight of the Home Office, were administrative. They were to propose, where appropriate, for order by the Home Secretary, the division of their areas into petty sessional divisions, to appoint one or more justices' clerks for their area and to provide courses of instruction to magistrates. The local authorities within whose area each MCC was located were to be responsible for the court accommodation and all the expenses of transacting the business of the court, the nature of that provision to be determined by the MCC in consultation with the authorities. All fines and fees were to be paid to the Home Office. The Home Office in turn was to make a grant to the local authorities within each MCC area of an amount representing the proceeds of certain fines, plus two thirds of the difference between them and actual expenditure. In practice the grant represented about 80% of the total cost, leaving the local authorities to fund the balance of 20%. The Criminal Justice Act 1972 formalised that funding ratio.

== The Le Vay Scrutiny ==
A key principle of the 1949 Act was that magistrates' courts should operate on a local basis with a large degree of autonomy. However, it left the central issue of accountability unanswered. In 1989, Julian Le Vay, a civil servant, conducted an "Efficiency Scrutiny of the Magistrates' Courts" on the instruction of the Home Secretary. He observed that neither the Roche Report nor the 1949 Act dealt with management in any modern sense:

"The Act left the justices' clerk with responsibility for day to day running of courts and court offices, but did not make clear to whom he was answerable (if at all), now that he was appointed by a body separate from the bench he served. Nor was central Government given any say in the level or use of resources it was committed to provide."

In the 1960s and early 1970s the Bar Council, The Law Society, the Magistrates' Association and the Justices' Clerks' Society proposed centralisation of the management of magistrates' courts with a view to achieving greater efficiency, training and use of accommodation. The county councils opposed the proposal, arguing that it was against the trend of devolution. The Home Secretary of the time also resisted it on the ground, amongst others, that it would transform justices' clerks and their staff into a central government service.

By 1989, when Le Vay was conducting his efficiency scrutiny of the magistrates' courts, the cost of administering them was about £200 million. Most of it was met from central funds, but with limited central supervision. He observed in his report that "it would be difficult to think of any arrangements less likely to deliver value for money", and added:

"The arrangements for managing magistrates' courts and their resources retain the local, part-time, almost amateur flavour of an earlier age. The arrangements have never been systematically appraised, and have not adapted to take account of the enormous increase since 1949 in the volume of business and the number of permanent staff, or the fact that central Government now foots most of the bill".

His principal recommendation was that administration of magistrates' courts should be "run as a national service, funded entirely by the Government - but with maximum delegation of managerial responsibility and control of resources to the local level", a proposal rejected, apparently, on the grounds of expense. He also made a number of other recommendations for improvements of the system, many of which found more favour.

== Police and Magistrates' Courts Act 1994 ==
On 1 April 1992, the Lord Chancellor assumed responsibility for the administration of the magistrates' courts. By then the cost of administering them was approaching £300 million. Le Vay's findings prompted the government to issue a white paper later that year entitled a "A New Framework for Justice", which in turn led to changes introduced by the Police and Magistrates' Courts Act 1994. These included: the amalgamation of MCCs; making them more clearly responsible for the administration of magistrates'courts in their areas and defining their responsibilities; permitting the co-option of two members in place of the former ex officio members; requiring each MCC to appoint a legally qualified chief executive, a justices' chief executive, whose function was to be purely administrative, as distinct from the legal and advisory role of the justices' clerk; giving the Lord Chancellor power to combine MCC areas and to direct MCCs as to their standards of performance; and the establishment of the Magistrates' Court Service Inspectorate.

== Reorganisation of magistrates' courts committees (MCCs) ==
When the Labour Government came to power in 1997 it expressed a strong desire to improve the over-all management of the criminal justice system at both national and local level. It sought to reduce the number of MCC areas, creating larger ones to share boundaries ('co-terminosity') with other criminal justice agencies, and to enable MCCs to determine and vary the structure of their petty sessional areas. It also sought a clearer distinction than had been achieved by the 1994 reforms between the administrative functions of the justices' chief executive and the legal and advisory responsibilities of the justices' clerk. The chosen areas for co-ordination of management were the 42 police authority areas established by the Local Government Act 1972. In 1997 there were 105 MCCs but these were reduced to 42. There was a similar re-organisation of the Crown Prosecution Service and Probation Service, and the HM Prison Service moved to a 13 area structure which aligned more closely with the 42 area boundaries.

There were further changes in the roles and responsibilities of MCCs. Members of MCCs were now selected for the contribution they could make to the task of efficient administration of their courts, not as representatives of individual benches. The Lord Chancellor's Department set targets, in the form of public service agreements, for magistrates' courts, and collected data to establish 'National Performance Indicators' of their efficiency and effectiveness. The Access to Justice Act 1999 also gave the Lord Chancellor greater authority over MCCs, including an ability to direct them to implement recommendations of the Magistrates' Courts Service Inspectorate; to issue a code of conduct for MCC members; and the right to dismiss them for non-compliance with it.

Reports of the Magistrates' Courts Inspectorate indicated a substantial improvement in MCCs' performance from 1997. Notable achievements in addition to the structural re-organisations of the MCC areas and of court provision were the improvements MCCs made in the service to and treatment of court users. These included better facilities for witnesses and the disabled, the introduction of complaints procedures, expressing court documents in plain English and the publication of charters concerning quality of service.

But the MCCs and the courts that they administered were still in a state of transition. Their reduction, from over 100 to 42, was accompanied by a steady progression of amalgamations of benches and closures of little-used courts, mainly in rural areas. These amalgamations were accompanied by a move to confine a number of benches within individual MCC areas to a single justices' clerk. A number of factors contributed to these developments, the most important being the limits placed by central government on MCCs' budgets, recognition of the need to provide better facilities for all court users, and a drive to concentrate work to achieve speedier, more efficient and cost effective justice.

These developments caused, and continue to cause, concern among magistrates and many others about loss of 'local justice'.

== Magistrates' courts committees in London ==
On 1 April 2001, special financial arrangements were introduced for London for London. A new body, called the Greater London Magistrates’ Courts Authority, came into being. It differed from MCCs in a number of important respects: in mandatory inclusion of representatives of local authorities and of the District Judge Bench; in its ownership of property; and in the mechanics of its financing. It consisted of magistrates, at least one of whom had to be a district judge, and mayoral and other local authority nominees. Not only did it own its courthouses and associated property, but it also acted as a paying authority in its own right. However, it did receive its revenue funding from two different sources and in the same proportions as the MCCs, namely 80% from the Lord Chancellor’s Department and 20% from the Corporation of the City of London and the 32 London boroughs.

== Demise of magistrates' courts committees ==
In 2001, the "Review of the Criminal Courts of England and Wales" (the Auld Report) was published.

The government's response to the Auld Report, a white paper entitled "Justice for All", was published in 2002, recommended that one agency should manage the courts in England and Wales, instead of the Magistrates' Courts Service and the Court Service (for the county courts, crown courts and higher courts) being administered separately.

The Courts Act 2003 created the legal framework required to make the necessary changes. There followed the Unified Courts Administration Programme which aimed to devise a system which would offer improved and consistent services to court users by providing:

- A single national agency solely responsible for the delivery of court services with improved and more consistent level of service to court users
- More resources available to support the delivery of justice
- Greater flexibility in the use of court buildings.

On 1 April 2005, responsibility for the 42 existing magistrates’ courts committees and the Court Service (responsible for the county courts and Crown Court) passed to Her Majesty’s Courts Service which, on 1 April 2011, merged with the Tribunals Service to form Her Majesty's Courts and Tribunals Service.

== Sources ==
- "Review of the Criminal Courts of England and Wales" (The Auld Report), September 2001
