= Legal adviser =

Official of the magistrates' court in England and Wales

A legal adviser, formerly referred to as a justices' clerk or clerk to the justices is an official of the magistrates' court in England and Wales whose primary role is to provide legal advice to justices of the peace (also known as magistrates).

== History ==
The office of justices' clerk (or clerk to the justices) is historically linked with the development of the office of justice of the peace in England and Wales from the 12th century. The Justices of the Peace Act 1361 provided, amongst other things, "That in every county of England shall be assigned for the keeping of the peace, one lord and with him three or four of the most worthy of the county, with "some learned in the law", and they shall have the power to restrain the Offenders, Rioters, and all other Barators, and to pursue, arrest, take and chastise them according to their Trespass or Offence". Originally known as "clerk of the peace", "clerk of the justices" or "clerk of the keepers of the peace", the clerk who assisted the justices at Quarter Sessions was required to act as a record keeper and, being a lawyer, to provide legal advice to justices of the peace. However, from Tudor times many justices used their personal servants as their legal advisers out of Quarter Sessions and, in the 19th century, many benches were using local solicitors to advise them in their Petty Sessions work. In 1848, as the summary jurisdiction of justices began to expand at Petty Sessions, so the importance of the role of justices' clerk increased and in 1851 an Act of Parliament allowed justices' clerks' fees to be paid out of public funds for the first time. By the 20th century, there was a preponderance of part-time clerks, which was criticised by the report of the Roche Committee in 1944. This report led to the Justices of the Peace Act 1949 and a move towards full-time clerks.

The role of justices' clerk was abolished by the Courts and Tribunals (Judiciary and Functions of Staff) Act 2018 and the role is now carried out by a legal adviser.

== The modern legal adviser ==
Although their functions have changed considerably over the intervening years legal advisers remain the linchpin of magistrates' courts. Because magistrates are unpaid members of the local community and do not need to have legal qualifications, they are advised in court on matters of law, practice and procedure by legal advisers. In 2010 there were 49 full-time justices' clerks in England and Wales. In 2015 they numbered 26.

The legal adviser's role has been adapted to account for modern requirements. The office holder is now a civil servant following the creation of Her Majesty's Courts Service (HMCS now His Majesty's Courts and Tribunals Service) on 1 April 2005. However, although the legal adviser is line managed by a senior civil servant for administrative purposes, he/she retains independence when undertaking judicial functions and giving legal advice to magistrates.

=== Judicial powers ===
A justices' clerk had the powers of a single magistrate, for example to issue a summons, adjourn proceedings, extend bail, issue a warrant for failing to surrender to bail where there is no objection on behalf of the accused, dismiss an information where no evidence is offered, request a pre-sentence report, commit a defendant for trial without consideration of the evidence and give directions in criminal and family proceedings. The justices' clerk may delegate these functions to a legal adviser (referred to as "assistant justices' clerk" in the relevant legislation).

Nowadays, legal advisers may be granted these powers.

=== Advising and supporting magistrates ===
The legal adviser is also responsible for the legal advice tendered to magistrates in and out of the courtroom either personally or by his assistant legal advisers. In the courtroom, whether or not requested, a legal adviser must provide advice necessary for magistrates to properly perform their functions. This includes advice on:-

- questions of law
- mixed law and fact
- practice and procedure
- range of penalties
- relevant decisions of higher courts and other guidelines
- other relevant issues
- decision making structures

Additionally, in the court room, the legal adviser and his assistants may ask questions of witnesses and parties to clarify evidence and issues. They must ensure that every case is conducted fairly and assist unrepresented defendants to present their cases (without becoming an advocate). Where appropriate, they are responsible for assisting magistrates with the formulation and recording of reasons.

=== Other functions ===
Outside the court room, the legal adviser also supports the work of a bench (or benches) of magistrates by providing administrative support and advice to their various committees and meetings, is responsible for their training and development of magistrates, and assists in their pastoral care. He/she is also responsible for the management and training of legal advisers and with his/her management team, provide guidance and directions to other staff on legal issues and operational matters, such as listing. They work towards achieving improvements in performance and with other criminal justices agencies through Criminal Justice Boards.

The Justices' Clerks' Society, the membership of which included all legal advisers, provided professional leadership for lawyers who work in the magistrates' courts by giving legal advice and guidance, and was represented on a number of national bodies and HMCTS steering and working groups. Its President met regularly with the Senior Presiding Judge for England and Wales. The Society appears to have closed down sometime after 2008.

=== Appointment, reassignment or removal ===
A legal adviser is appointed under section 28 of the Courts Act 2003 by the Lord Chancellor and designated as such after consultation with the Lord Chief Justice to one or more local justice areas. Previously, justices' clerks were appointed under section 27. A person could only be designated if he/she had a five-year magistrates' court qualification, was a barrister or solicitor who had served for not less than five years as an assistant to a justices' clerk, or had previously been a justices' clerk. Assistants were required to have certain minimum qualifications (see Justices' Clerks (Qualification of Assistants) Rules 1979 (SI 1979/570), as amended).

The Assistants to Justices' Clerks Regulations 2006, in regulation 3, set out the qualifications for assistants to justices' clerks who could be employed as clerks in court. They provided that people who have qualified as barristers or solicitors and had passed the exams for either of those professions or had been granted an exemption were qualified to be assistants to justices' clerks which meant that they can carry out matters on behalf of the justices' clerk. The 2006 Regulations also enabled the Lord Chancellor to make temporary appointments of people to act as clerks in court where he was satisfied that they were, in the circumstances, suitable and that no other arrangement can reasonably be made.

However, the Assistants to Justices' Clerks (Amendment) Regulations 2007 amended regulation 3 of the 2006 Regulations. The effect was to clarify that those:

1. who were in employment as an assistant registered by the Law Society under regulation 23 of the Training Regulations 1990;
2. who held a valid training certificate granted by a magistrates' courts committee before 1 January 1999; or
3. who acted as a clerk in court before 1 January 1999 and were qualified to act as such under the Justices' Clerks (Qualification of Assistants) Rules 1979 (as amended) to carry out the duties of assistant clerks can act;

may act as clerks in court.

Section 27 (4) of the Courts Act 2003 (now repealed) provided that before reassigning a justices' clerk, the Lord Chancellor must consult the bench chairman of the relevant local justice areas.

== See also ==
- Law clerk
