= Eleri Rees =

Welsh judge

Her Honour Judge Eleri Rees
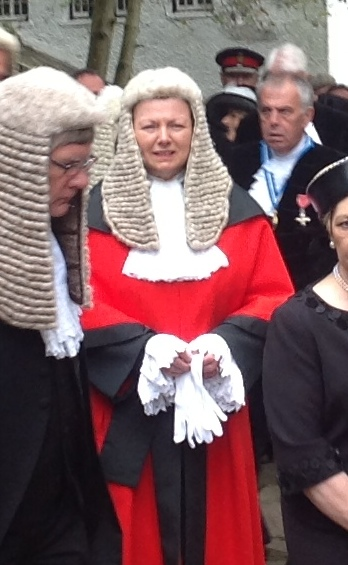
- Rees (centre, red robes) in 2013

Resident Judge of Cardiff Crown Court
- Incumbent
- Assumed office 18 June 2012

Recorder of Cardiff
- Incumbent
- Assumed office 18 June 2012

Personal details
- Born: Eleri Mair Morgan; 7 July 1953 (age 73)
- Spouse: Alan Rees
- Education: University of Liverpool

Eleri Mair Rees (née Morgan; born 7 July 1953) is a Welsh judge. Since 18 June 2012, she has been the Resident Judge of Cardiff Crown Court and Recorder of Cardiff. She has been a circuit judge since 2002. She was called to the bar in 1975, and served as a Justices' clerk from 1983 to 1994 and as a stipendiary magistrate (later renamed District Judge (Magistrates' Courts)) between 1994 and 2002.

== Early life and education ==
Rees was born on 7 July 1953. She was educated at Ardwyn Grammar School, a grammar school in Aberystwyth, Wales. She studied law at the University of Liverpool, graduating with a Bachelor of Laws (LLB) degree.

== Legal career ==
In 1975, Rees was called to the bar at Gray's Inn. As was common for the time, she struggled to find a pupillage. Instead of practising as a barrister, she joined the Magistrates' Courts Service. From 1983 to 1994, she served as a justices' clerk at Bexley Magistrates' Court in London.

On 3 May 1994, Rees became a Metropolitan Stipendiary Magistrate: this was a legally qualified, professional magistrate who could sit alone to hear cases. She was appointed a Deputy District Judge (Magistrates' Courts) in 1992. In 1998, she was additionally appointed an Assistant Recorder, a part-time circuit judge. Due to the Access to Justice Act 1999, Stipendiary Magistrates were renamed District Judges (Magistrates' Courts).

On 18 July 2000, Rees was appointed a Recorder of the Midland and Oxford Circuit. On 23 April 2002, she was appointed a Circuit Judge. She has also been the Liaison Judge for the Welsh Language since 2002. On 18 June 2012, she was promoted to Senior Circuit Judge, and appointed Resident Judge of Cardiff Crown Court and Recorder of Cardiff.

== Personal life ==
In 1975, the then Eleri Morgan married Alan Rees.

Legal offices
Preceded by Nicholas Cooke	Recorder of Cardiff; 2012 to present	Incumbent
