= Courts Service (disambiguation) =

Courts Service may refer to any of the following:

- Her Majesty's Courts Service, an agency formerly responsible for Courts administration in England and Wales
- Her Majesty's Courts and Tribunals Service
- Northern Ireland Courts and Tribunals Service
- Scottish Courts and Tribunals Service
- Courts Service, an agency responsible for administration of the Courts of the Republic of Ireland
