= Elloe =

Elloe is a sub-regional name in South Holland, Lincolnshire, England. It may refer to:

== In Lincolnshire, England ==
- Elloe (wapentake), in Parts of Holland
- Elloe Stone, in Moulton, Lincolnshire
- Deanery of Elloe East, an administrative area of the Diocese of Lincoln
- Deanery of Elloe West, an administrative area of the Diocese of Lincoln
- East Elloe Rural District

== Other uses ==
- Elloe Kaifi, a Marvel Comics character

== See also ==
- Elloes, a petty sessional division in Lincolnshire
- Ello, a comune in Lecco, Lombardy, Italy
