= Elloes =

Coordinates: 52.77°N 0.02°W

Elloes was a local justice area (LJA) and former petty sessional division in Lincolnshire, England. It was formed in 1990 by a merger of the former East Elloe and West Elloe petty sessional divisions, which were named for the historic Elloe wapentake. It was abolished in 2010 and merged into the new South Lincolnshire LJA. South Lincolnshire was itself abolished in 2013 and merged into the new Lincolnshire LJA.
