= George Bean =

George Bean may refer to:

- George Bean (cricketer) (1864–1923), English cricketer
- George Bean (judge) (1915–1973), British barrister and judge
- George Ewart Bean (1903–1977), English archaeologist and writer
- George Bean (politician) (c. 1845–1912), South Australian entrepreneur and parliamentarian
- George Bean (c. 1805–1869), his father, South Australian businessman, see Bean Brothers
