= Drug action team =

UK multi-agency partnerships

Drug Action Teams ("DAT") are multi-agency partnerships created by the 1995 United Kingdom National Drug Strategy. DATs are responsible for coordinating local initiatives and programmes on drug and alcohol use, and reporting how said programmes support the national strategy to national public health agencies.

== Overview ==
Names and substances included in programming vary across the UK. In England, some DATs also have a remit for alcohol and are called Drug and Alcohol Action Teams ("DAAT"). English DATs and DAATs operate within their top level local authority (i.e. county or unitary authority). In Scotland, all DATs also have a remit for alcohol and are now called Alcohol and Drug Partnerships ("ADP"). In Wales, five Drug and Alcohol Action Teams were replaced by four Strategic Coordination Teams (SCT) in each of the Welsh police authority areas.

== Activities ==
All of these agencies focus on coordinating services for their local communities. These services, according to the Bournemouth DAAT, can include: identifying important local drug misuse issues; creating local action plans and programmes; designing treatment and other interventions to help people with substance abuse issues; support alcohol and drug interventions; develop and support recovery programs.

The status of DATs changed with the arrival of Crime and Disorder Reduction Partnerships (“CDRP”) in England and Community Safety Partnerships (“CSP”) in Wales in 1998. In some areas, DAT functions are carried out by the CDRP. In others, the DAT is effectively a sub-committee of the CDRP.

== Funding ==
DATs in England are funded from various sources, including the Pooled Treatment Budget (PTB) via the National Treatment Agency for Substance Misuse (NTA) and the Drug Interventions Programme via the Home Office. In 2013 the National Treatment Agency was merged into the newly formed Public Health England.
