= Australian National Task Force on Cannabis =

1992 government task force

- Abbreviation: NTFC
- Formation: 1992
- Type: Specialised task force
- Origins: Ministerial Council on Drug Strategy (MCDS)
- Affiliations: National Drug Strategy (NDS)

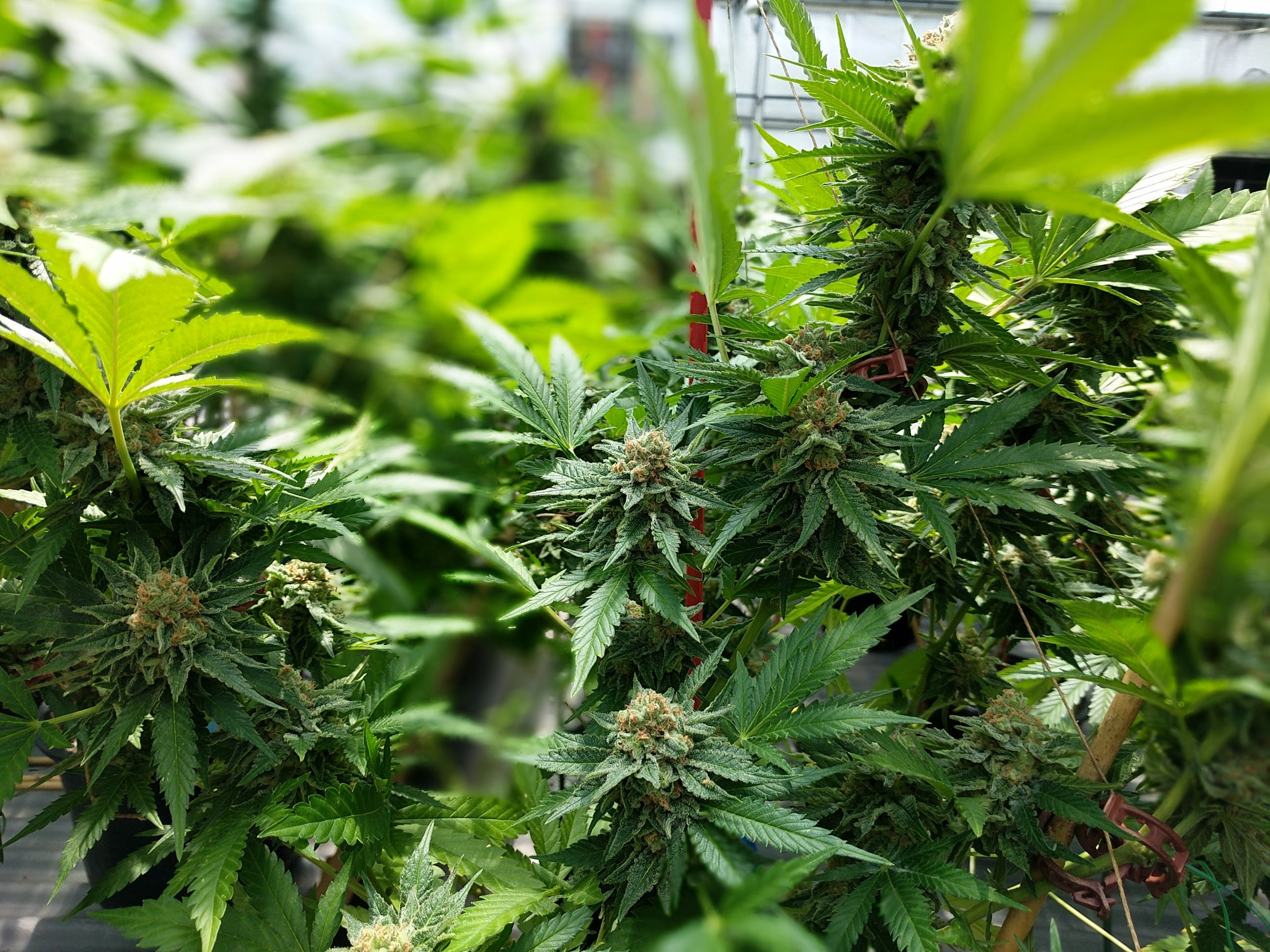
Cannabis plants in a commercial grow facility.

The Australian National Task Force on Cannabis (NTFC) was a specialised unit formed in April 1992 under the aegis of the Ministerial Council on Drug Strategy (MCDS) who are responsible for implementing national consistency in policy principles related to Australia's National Drug Strategy.

The Task Force was initiated to analyse the usage of non-medical cannabis in Australia and review options for reform. In 1994 the NTFC published its findings (a series of four technical reports by commissioned specialists and an executive summary) and recommended imposing civil penalties for minor cannabis crimes. It concluded that the harm of criminal penalties was greater than cannabis itself. The Ministerial Council did not initially accept the Task Force's recommendation.

Although the Northern Territory acted on the Task Force's recommendation by imposing a civil scheme for minor cannabis offences (1996). The scheme was modelled on the South Australian CEN scheme introduced in 1989 (civil schemes operated already in SA and the ACT in 1992). The Commonwealth Department of Health extended on the NTFC's principle research (1995-1998) by funding reports for the Australian Institute of Criminology and National Drug Strategy Committee.

== Task Force establishment ==
The NTFC's purpose of researching and informing national cannabis policy emerged in response to increased cannabis use in Australia, followed by growing concern about its health impacts.

Cannabis use rose from the early 1970s and grew exponentially throughout the 1980s (from 20% in 1973 to 60% in 1993). Rates of cannabis use among Australian adolescents were almost the highest in the developed world in the early 1990s.

In 1992, the minister for Justice at the time (Michael Tate) called for more information on cannabis use and its effects at the Ministerial Council meeting.

== Task Force research ==
World map of countries by annual prevalence of cannabis use according to the United Nations.

=== Cannabis trends ===
The NTFC report indicated that life-time cannabis use among young Australian adults had risen from less than 20% in 1973 to 60% in 1993. Rates of cannabis use in Australia were similar to those in New Zealand and probably higher than those in other OECD countries (Canada, Netherlands, United Kingdom and United States). Use was most prevalent among younger adults.

=== Cannabis as a "gateway drug" ===
The NTFC report stated that the use of cannabis was not thought to directly initiate the use of other illicit drugs. The 1993 national household survey indicated that 96 per cent of cannabis users did not go on to try other illicit drugs.

The gateway theory has been discounted several times.

=== Cannabis health and psychological effects ===
The NTFC reported several health effects of cannabis use, including risks that were identified as “major”, “majorly probable” and “majorly possible”. There is less conclusive scientific evidence confirming the “majorly probable” and “majorly possible” risks of cannabis use, as it is difficult to measure the effects of cannabis use over the long term.

Bodily effects of cannabis use

The several “major” health effects of acute cannabis use (short-term effects of cannabis) found by the NTFC were:

- Anxiety, dysphoria, panic and paranoia
- Psychomotor impairment
- Increased risk of experiencing psychotic symptoms among those pre-exposed to psychosis
- Increased risk of lower birth weight babies

According to the NTFC the major effects of acute use only affected a minority of regular users.

The several “major probable” health effects of chronic cannabis found by the NTFC were:

- Respiratory diseases connected to smoking (chronic bronchitis and histopathological changes)
- Cognitive impairment (especially of memory and attention)
- Cannabis dependence syndrome

The long-term effects of cannabis remain uncertain.

The other “major possible” risks of chronic use found by the NTFC were:

- Cancers of the oral cavity (pharynx and oesophagus)
- Lowered cognitive skills leading to reduced educational and occupational performance in adolescents
- Birth defects if cannabis is used during pregnancy (effects in pregnancy)

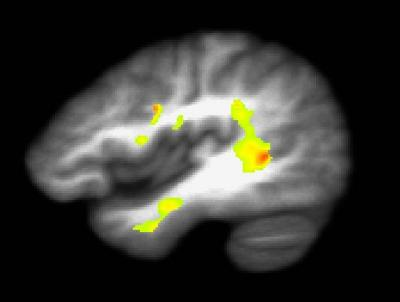
Brain of a cannabis user

No clear evidence of these links have been provided.

The NTFC report concluded that there were three ‘high risk’ groups: adolescents (as use was most prevalent and could result in increased dependence), women of childbearing age and persons with pre-existing conditions.

=== Cannabis legislative options ===
The NTFC report identified five legislative options for reform. Four were seen as currently viable:

- Total prohibition criminalising all cannabis offence
- A civil scheme applying civil penalties for minor offences (the possession and cultivation of small amounts of cannabis for personal use)
- Partial prohibition criminalising the supply and distribution of cannabis but not personal use quantities
- Government regulation over the production, distribution and sale of cannabis
- A free availability scheme; not currently seen as a viable option.

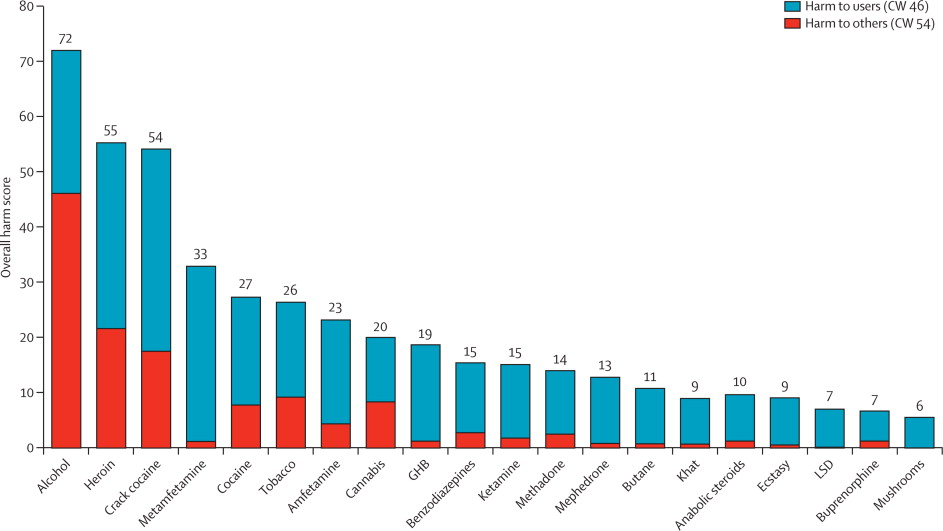
Drug harm ranking (harm to users and harm to others)

Most legislative options considered how criminal penalties resulted in “significant social harm” through the imposition of criminal records on users that increased involvement in the criminal justice system and the likelihood of exposure to other illicit drug markets.

The NTFC stated that in their opinion, a total prohibition policy over-targets harm. Current total prohibition policies (implemented in most Australian and US states) had been unsuccessful in reducing drug use and cause “significant social harm”. They are also associated with high financial costs of law enforcement.

The NTFC concluded that a civil scheme would cause minimal “social harm” because it would separate the cannabis market from other (more serious) drug markets. The NTFC stated that the already operating schemes in Australia were subject to improvement but had no negative effects on the community.

The NTFC stated there was a significant question as to whether the partial prohibition system or regulation scheme is effective at addressing harm. A partial prohibition system would reduce “social harm” and the financial costs of law enforcement, but it had not been implemented or evaluated yet in any country. A regulation scheme would remove the incentive for a black market in cannabis but, leave non-targeted those forms of use that are high-risk (particularly adolescents or those prone to dependency).

=== Public perception of cannabis legislative options ===
The NTFC measured public receptivity toward cannabis legislative options through conducting 1608 telephone surveys. The majority of respondents believed activities relating to large amounts of cannabis, or the supply and sale of cannabis should be illegal. A small majority of respondents (52-55% averaged across states) believed cannabis should be made legal. The most support was in the Northern Territory (68%) and the least support was in Queensland (44%). Of those respondents who thought that personal cannabis use should remain illegal, there were a significant percentage who did believe that it did not warrant criminal penalties (75% of all respondents).

Public support for the discontinued application of criminal penalties for personal use has grown in Australia has grown in recent years according to research.

== Task Force recommendation ==
=== Civil scheme recommendation ===
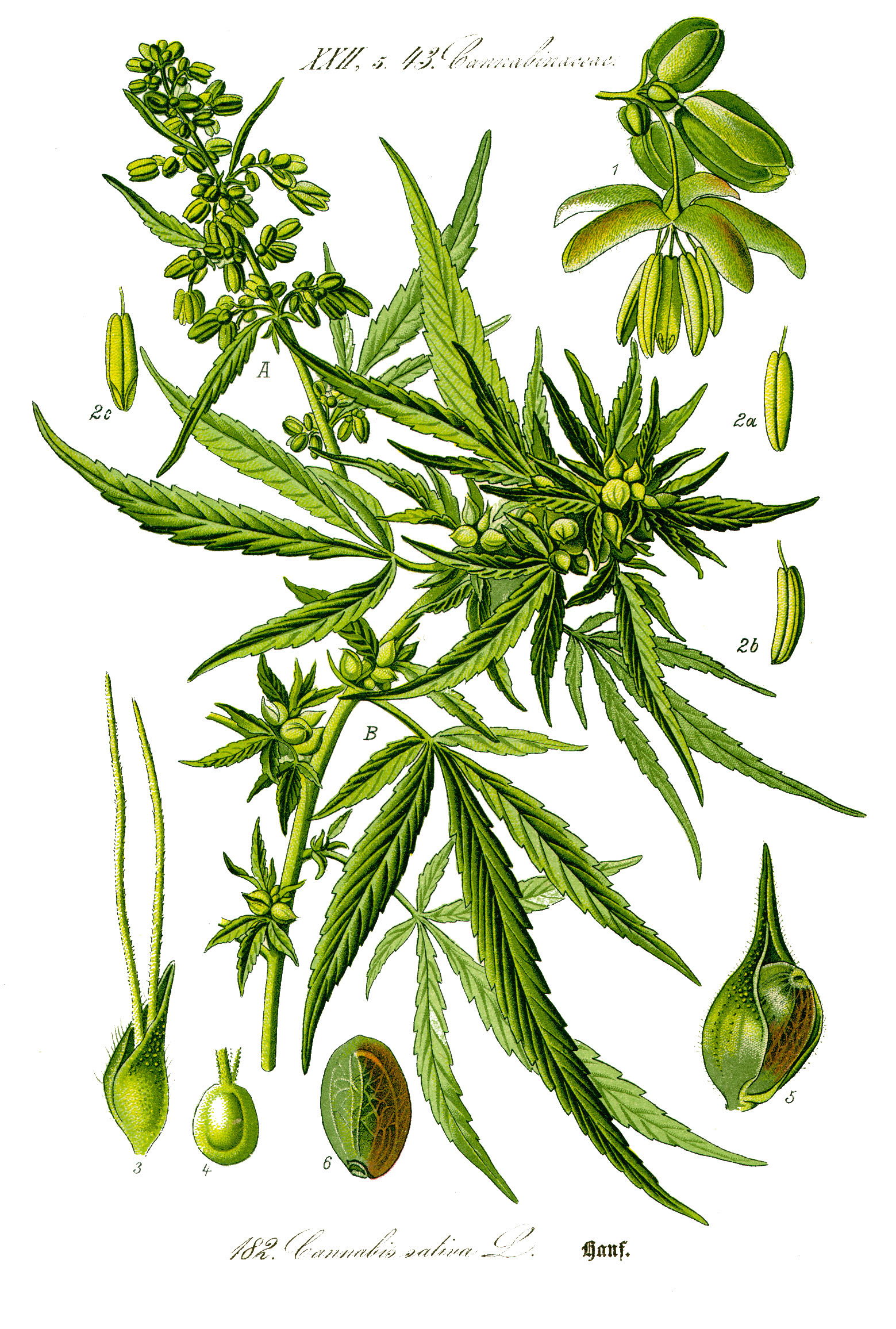
Illustration of Cannabis satvia

The NTFC recommended the Ministerial Council develop a national cannabis policy imposing civil penalties for personal use. The NTFC justified a civil schemes application by arguing that the social and economic costs of enforcing criminal penalties on cannabis users far outweighed any benefits in deterring use or the harms arising from use. The Task Force cited that cannabis use was widespread, that its adverse health effects were modest and affected a minority of regular users, that criminal penalties did not affect the rate of cannabis use and that the majority of Australians supported the discontinued application of criminal penalties.

The NTFC also recommended the increased allocation of time on information on the health consequences of cannabis and improved treatment options. The NTFC stated this specific aim of increasing awareness as being an attempt to delay the onset of cannabis use amongst adolescents.

==== Response ====
The Ministerial Council on Drug strategy did not initially accept the Task Force's key recommendation, for reasons that are unknown because their deliberations are secret. Although the NTFC's research and accompanying reviews were still published.

The Northern Territory (NT) acted on the Task Force's recommendations with its introduction of the Misuse of Drugs Cannabis Amendment Act 1996 which imposed minor civil penalties for small quantities of possession and use. Civil schemes imposing fines for minor cannabis penalties were already operating in South Australia (SA) in 1989 and the Australian Capital Territory (ACT) in 1992.

The Commonwealth Department of Health also funded research recommended by the Task Force (for the Australian Institute of Criminology and the National Drug Strategy), acknowledging that the community was less informed about cannabis use than alcohol, tobacco, heroin and amphetamines.

== Task Force research extension ==
=== Research in support of a civil scheme ===
==== Social harm ====
The argument that civil schemes could reduce social harm was supported by most accompanying reviews at an international, federal and state level. For example, similar arguments for cannabis decriminalisation were made in Canada, the Netherlands, the United Kingdom, the United States in 1960-1970, and by the Australian Senate Committee in 1977.

In 1998, the Commonwealth Department of Health funded a report for the National Drug Strategy Committee which concluded that the social harm of criminal penalties far outweighed those arising under a civil scheme. Criminal records in Western Australia were more likely to lead to further contact with the police (most likely because police had electronic access to these records), which adversely affected employment opportunities, accommodation choices and personal relationships. Criminal records also appeared to have no unique advantage in deterring use, with 87% of 68 convicted offenders continuing their use at the same rate as before six months later.

In 2001-2002, the Australian parliament published its critical overview of cannabis and argued that when adequately refined "a civil prohibitionist approach has a greater capacity to minimise harm than criminal prohibitionist approach." A failure to expiate and net-widening effect could be combatted by increasing clear and comprehensive information about expiation, allowing payment through instalment or community service and enforcing more flexible police diversion according to the overview.

==== Cost Analysis ====
In Australia, in 1995 the Commonwealth Department of Health funded a report for the Australian Institute of Criminology. In analysing the costs of law enforcement, it stated that there was "accumulating evidence for the de-criminalisation of minor cannabis crimes". The report estimated that 13% of all criminal justice and police resources were devoted to detecting and processing cannabis offences, which consisted of 73% of total drug enforcement resources (despite 87% of all cannabis offences reported being minor). This also cost cannabis law enforcement an estimated $329 million in 1991-92 and by comparison, the value of the black market was estimated to be $1.9 million.

==== "Net-widening" effect ====
There was concern expressed over a "net-widening effect" arising under civil schemes (6231 cannabis offences were reported in South Australia in 1987/88 compared to 17,425 reported in 1996/96). However, according to the Committee's report, this was consistent with similar rates of increase across Australia. There was a 10% increase in the proportion of the population who had used cannabis in South Australia (under a civil scheme), but Victoria and Tasmania had similar rates of increase (under a criminal prohibition scheme).

=== Research not in support of a civil scheme ===
==== Psychological harm ====
In Australia and worldwide, there is attention focusing increasingly on the nature of cannabis' relationship to mental illness and concern has been expressed over whether cannabis decriminalisation best protects high-risk groups such as adolescents identified as being prone to dependency.

The Australian parliament in their 2001-2002 critical overview, raised the argument that no legislative approach to drug use does not, in itself, generate harms. The overview cited emerging evidence of the role that cannabis may play in the development of dependence syndromes.

Scale to assess the harm of drugs (mean physical harm and mean dependence)

According to some reports, prolonged cannabis use (now termed CUD) causes decreased reactivity to dopamine, suggesting a possible link to an inhibited reward system and an increased addiction of severity. Cannabis use disorder is now defined in the fifth revision of the Diagnostic and Statistical Manual of Mental Disorders, the main authoritative guide for mental health disorders in Australia.

In 1996, the Queensland Parliamentary Criminal Justice Committee argued that "the central goal of any legislative scheme" should be to discourage the use of cannabis and that the research available does reveal incidents of serious short and possible long-term effects associated with cannabis use.

Recent research has indicated that adolescent cannabis use is associated with increased misuse as an adult, as well as long-term cognitive implications and psychiatric problems. This may be because the endocannabinoid system is directly involved in adolescent brain development.

In Wayne.D. Hall's 2008 journal "The contribution of research to the development of a national cannabis policy in Australia", he stated that evidence from longitudinal studies strongly supports the casual connection between cannabis use and psychosis, depression and adverse psychological outcomes. He argues that proponents of decriminalisation tend to "discount this evidence".

==== Public opinion ====
The Australian Institute of Criminology acknowledged in their 1995 report that a "strong constituency exists for maintaining the current approach to dealing with cannabis", which was the product of widely held concern about the health impacts of cannabis. In Australia at this time, a moderate proportion of the population still believed cannabis should be illegal (64% of the population in Queensland thought cannabis should remain illegal).

== The impact of research evidence on cannabis policy ==
The purpose of research on cannabis has been twofold: to provide research in the area to determine its usage and effects, but also to treat research as evidence that is relevant to choosing approaches to cannabis.

Research evidence that cannabis criminalisation is associated with social harm led to the National Drug Strategy development of an initiative (1999) to encourage the diversion of first-time drug offenders to education and counselling programs. According to Wayne.D.Hall in his paper on "The contribution of research to the development of a national cannabis policy in Australia", the decriminalisation of cannabis was not an intended outcome of this initiative but partly resulted in this effect due to most first-time drug offences being cannabis-related.

In 1995, the Victorian State Premier appointed a Drug Council which proposed to remove criminal penalties for cannabis use following the advisory of the Task Force but, conservative political parties opposed this. In 1999, an attempt by the New South Wales Premier to decriminalise cannabis produced similar outcomes. In 2004, a newly elected Western Australian premier decriminalised cannabis after a Drug Summit supported the proposal. Small fines for quantities of personal were imposed, and offenders unable to pay were offered the alternative of counselling or treatment.

A National Cannabis Strategy of harm reduction was officially formed in 2006 by the National Drug Strategy committee and endorsed by the Ministerial Council (MCDS). The evidence cited for this policy initiative was epidemiological data on the rising rates of use among young people, as well as evidence from longitudinal studies in Australia and New Zealand that regular use of cannabis was associated with a number of negative long-term effects (e.g. dependency, cognitive implications and psychiatric problems). The strategy supported cannabis prohibition but, recommended imposing civil penalties for use and possession and interventions for cannabis users. It also advocated for public education campaigns (mainly to discourage high-risk users), efforts to reduce cannabis availability and improved treatment options.

In Australia, criminal penalties for cannabis offences remain in Tasmania, Victoria, New South Wales and Queensland but jurisdictions have adopted 'diversionary' cautioning procedures.

== See also ==
- Cannabis in Australia
- Illicit drug use in Australia
- Legalise Cannabis Australia
