= Daat (disambiguation) =

Daat or DAAT may refer to:

- Daat Island, Malaysia
- Da'at, a mystical state in Kabbalah
- Aguenar – Hadj Bey Akhamok Airport, Algeria, ICAO airport code DAAT
- Drug and Alcohol Action Team, in the UK
- Devon Air Ambulance Trust, in England
