= David Bean (judge) =

British judge

The Right Honourable Lord Justice Bean
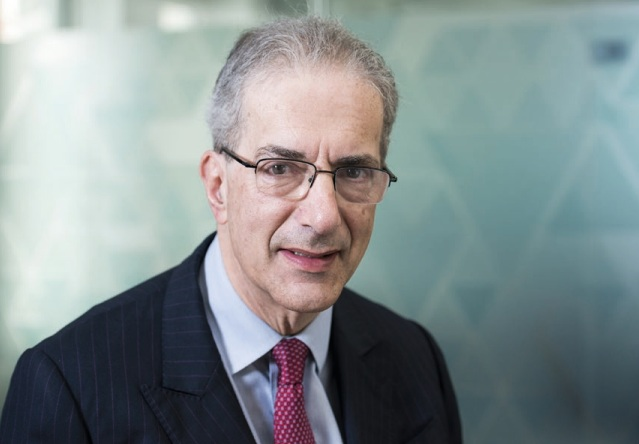

Lord Justice of Appeal
- Incumbent
- Assumed office October 2014

Chairman of the Law Commission
- In office August 2015 – 2018
- Monarchs: Elizabeth II; Charles III
- Preceded by: Sir David Lloyd Jones
- Succeeded by: Nicholas Green

Justice of the High Court
- In office 19 July 2004 – 30 September 2014

Personal details
- Born: David Michael Bean; 25 February 1954 (age 72)
- Education: St Paul's School, London
- Alma mater: Trinity Hall, Cambridge

Sir David Michael Bean (born 25 March 1954) is a British judge of the Court of Appeal of England and Wales.

== Early life and education ==
David Bean was born on 25 March 1954, the son of High Court judge Sir George Bean. He was educated at St Paul's School, an all-boys independent school in Barnes, London. He studied law at Trinity Hall, Cambridge between 1972 and 1975, graduating from the University of Cambridge with a first-class honours Bachelor of Arts (BA) degree. He was President of the Cambridge Union in Lent term 1975. He previously served as Treasurer of the Society of Labour Lawyers.

== Legal career ==
=== Barrister (1976–2004) ===
On 29 July 1976, David Bean was called to the bar at Middle Temple. He was a founding member of Matrix Chambers, specialising in employment, discrimination, education and public law. Bean was Chair of the Fabian Society from 1989 to 1990.

In 1992, Bean was appointed an Assistant Recorder. On 11 March 1996, he was appointed as a Recorder on the South Eastern Circuit. In 1997, he was appointed a Queen's Counsel (QC). Bean was appointed a bencher by Middle Temple on 6 March 2001. Between 2001 and 2004 he was Chairman of the Immigration Services Tribunal.

==== Chairman of the Bar ====
In 2002, he was elected Chairman of the General Council of the Bar, the professional association for barristers in England and Wales.

As chairman, he publicly opposed the then Lord Chief Justice, Harry Woolf, in defence of Magna Carta’s guarantee of the right to trial by jury. This came in response to a proposal put forward by Lord Justice Auld in October 2001, with the advent of the second Blair government, which had pledged in its manifesto to abolish jury trials for offences carrying sentences of up to two years’ imprisonment. He argued that such a reform would come "at the expense of justice".

Why is it a good idea to see the decision-making power away from ordinary people to decide whether somebody is guilty or innocent, and hand it over to full-time magistrates or experienced lay-magistrates, who will be much older than the defendant they are trying, and very case-hardened?

Bean issued a scathing rebuttal in print to Sir John Stevens, then Commissioner of Police of the Metropolis, following Stevens’s article titled "Justice is a Joke: Britain's Top Cop Savages Our Soft, Pathetic Courts."

=== Court of Queen's Bench (2004–2014) ===
On 19 July 2004, Bean was appointed a judge of the High Court of Justice (Queen's Bench Division) and received the customary knighthood.

From 2007 to 2010, he served as the presiding judge of the South Eastern Circuit. In 2010, Mr Justice Bean presided over the trial of Jon Venables who had been accused of downloading and distributing indecent images of children. Venables was found guilty and Bean sentenced him to two years in prison. Bean also ruled that Venables' new identity, which had been granted after he murdered James Bulger as a teenager, was not to be published; Bulger's family criticised this decision. He also presided over the murder trial of Saud bin Abdulaziz bin Nasser Al Saud, a member of the Saudi royal family, and over the trial of Asil Nadir for false accounting.

From October 2010 to March 2014, he was a Commissioner of the Judicial Appointments Commission, the body that selects candidates for judicial office.

=== Lord Justice of Appeal (2014–present) ===
On 1 October 2014, Bean was appointed a Lord Justice of Appeal. He was appointed to the Privy Council in 2014.

In August 2015, he was appointed Chairman of the Law Commission, succeeding Lord Justice Lloyd Jones. On 4 November 2015, he was made an Honorary Fellow of The Academy of Experts in recognition of his contribution to The Academy's Judicial Committee and work for Expert Witnesses. He became Deputy Treasurer of the Middle Temple in 2018, and in January 2019 he became Treasurer.

In August 2025, Bean delivered the appellate court's ruling on the Epping migrant hotel case.

== Honours ==
On 8 April 1997, David Bean was appointed a Queen's Counsel. As a High Court judge, he received the customary knighthood as a Knight Bachelor and as a Lord Justice of Appeal he was appointed to the Privy Council.

== Personal life ==
His second wife was the civil servant Ruth Thompson. He is a member of the Athenaeum Club and the Reform Club.

Party political offices
Preceded by Bryan Gould	Chair of the Fabian Society; 1989–1990	Succeeded by Robin Cook
