= Petty session =

Local courts

Courts of petty session, established from around the 1730s, were local courts consisting of magistrates, held for each petty sessional division (usually based on the county divisions known as hundreds) in England, Wales, and Ireland. The session's work dealt with matters such as minor theft and larceny, assault, drunkenness, bastardy examinations, arbitration and deciding whether to refer a case to the quarter sessions. They were formalised by the Larceny Act 1827 (7 & 8 Geo. 4. c. 29) and the Petty Sessions (Ireland) Act 1827 (7 & 8 Geo. 4. c. 67). From 1872 the courts of petty sessions were also responsible for approving licences to sell alcohol in alehouses and public houses.

They were also later established in British colonies, including Australia. They were abolished in New South Wales on 31 December 1984.

Following the abolition of the courts of quarter sessions, which were also presided over by magistrates, the courts of petty sessions gradually became synonymous with "magistrates' courts", a term which had previously been used to refer to both the petty and quarter sessions. Magistrates' courts continued to be assigned to "petty sessional divisions" until these were renamed to local justice areas by section 8 of the Courts Act 2003. Section 30 of the same act also abolished the concept of distinct "petty-sessional court-houses".

== See also ==
- Magistrates' court
- Magistrates' court (England and Wales)
- Magistrates Court of South Australia, established as the Court of Petty Sessions
- Petty sessional division
