= Tribunals Service =

UK government agency

The Tribunals Service was an executive agency of the Ministry of Justice in the United Kingdom between April 2006 and March 2011.

The Tribunals Service was responsible for:

- Adjudicator to HM Land Registry
- Asylum and Immigration Tribunal
- Claims Management Services Tribunal
- Criminal Injuries Compensation Appeal Panel
- Employment tribunals
- Employment Appeal Tribunal
- Immigration Services Tribunal
- Information Tribunal
- Lands Tribunal
- Social Security Appeal Tribunal and the Child Support Appeals Tribunal, formerly managed by the Appeals Service.
- Transport Tribunal

== History ==
The Tribunals Service was created in response to Sir Andrew Leggatt's review of the UK tribunal system, entitled Tribunals for Users: One System, One Service, published in August 2001. Leggatt criticised the then existing system for administrating many tribunals, in particular he observed that some tribunals were not independent of the administrative bodies over which they were supposed to exert control; and that there was no uniformity of administration between the many tribunals.

The Leggatt report was followed by a white paper in July 2004, entitled Transforming Public Services: Complaints, Redress and Tribunals, which, amongst other recommendations, proposed bringing together a number of tribunals under the administrative of a newly created agency.

The government's plans came to fruition in April 2006, when the Tribunals Service was created out of the 16 tribunals that were already administered by the Department for Constitutional Affairs, together with a number transferred from other government departments. An example of the latter is the Social Security and Child Support Appeals Tribunal which was supplied with administrative support by the Appeals Service, which was formerly an executive agency in its own right, reporting to the Department for Work and Pensions.

In 2010 it was announced that the service would merge with Her Majesty's Courts Service to form a new unified body for all courts and tribunals in England and Wales. this merger took place on 1 April 2011 with the formation of Her Majesty's Courts and Tribunals Service.
