= Local justice area =

Local justice areas are units in England and Wales established by the Courts Act 2003, replacing and directly based on the previous petty sessional divisions. They have been in existence since 2005.

Whilst previously, local justice areas were used to determine which magistrates' courts may hear a particular case, since 1 April 2005, any magistrates' court in England and Wales may hear any case from anywhere in England and Wales.

The areas established were identical to the petty sessional divisions. They have since been amended by the merger of South Pembrokeshire and North Pembrokeshire to a single Pembrokeshire local justice area, and the merger of De Maldwyn and Welshpool to a single Montgomeryshire local justice area – this change came into force in 2006, although the magistrates already shared the same courtroom.

A further amendment occurred in 2006 when the areas of Shrewsbury, Oswestry and Drayton were combined to become a new area named Shrewsbury and North Shropshire. The areas of Telford and Bridgnorth and South Shropshire were also combined to become a new area named Telford and South Shropshire.

A major rearrangement culminated in April 2017, when many local justice areas were amalgamated to leave 75 across England and Wales.

Each local justice area was part of a larger courts board area, which replaced the magistrates' courts committee areas with the inauguration of Her Majesty's Courts Service in 2005. Courts boards were abolished in 2012.

Local Justice Areas will be abolished once Section 45 of the Judicial Review and Courts Act 2022 is brought into force.

== Post 2017 Local Justice Areas ==
These are the Local Justice Areas as lasted merged by The Local Justice Areas Order 2016, in effect from 1 April 2017:

- Avon and Somerset replaces the areas of Bristol, North Avon and Somerset
- Bedfordshire replaces the areas of Bedford and Mid Bedfordshire, and Luton and South Bedfordshire
- Berkshire replaces the areas of East Berkshire, West Berkshire and Reading
- Birmingham and Solihull replaces the areas of Birmingham, and Solihull
- Black Country replaces the areas of Dudley and Halesowen, Sandwell, Walsall and Aldridge, and Wolverhampton
- Buckinghamshire replaces the areas of Milton Keynes, Wycombe and Beaconsfield, and Central Buckinghamshire
- Cambridgeshire replaces the areas of Huntingdonshire, North Cambridgeshire and South Cambridgeshire
- Cardiff replaces the areas of Newcastle and Ogmore and Cardiff and the Vale of Glamorgan
- Carmarthenshire replaces the areas of Carmarthen, Dinefwr and Llanelli
- Central Kent
- Central London replaces the areas of Hammersmith and Fulham and Kensington and Chelsea, City of London and City of Westminster
- Ceredigion and Pembrokeshire replaces the areas of Ceredigion, and Pembrokeshire
- Cheshire replaces the areas of North Cheshire, South and East Cheshire, and West Cheshire
- Cleveland replaces the areas of Hartlepool and Teesside
- Cornwall replaces the areas of East Cornwall and West Cornwall
- County Durham and Darlington replaces the areas of North Durham and South Durham
- County of Wiltshire replaces the areas of North West Wiltshire, South East Wiltshire and Swindon
- Coventry and Warwickshire replaces the areas of Coventry District, and Warwickshire
- Dorset replaces the areas of East Dorset and West Dorset
- East Hampshire replaces the areas of South East Hampshire and South Hampshire
- East Kent
- East London replaces the areas of Hackney and Tower Hamlets, Newham and Waltham Forest
- Gloucestershire
- Greater Manchester replaces the areas of Bolton, Bury and Rochdale, Manchester and Salford, Oldham, Stockport, Tameside, Trafford, and Wigan and Leigh
- Gwent
- Herefordshire
- Humber replaces the areas of East Yorkshire, Grimsby and Cleethorpes, Hull and Holderness, and North Lincolnshire
- Isle of Wight
- Lancashire replaces the areas of Burnley, Pendle and Rossendale, Chorley, East Lancashire, Fylde Coast, Lancaster, Ormskirk, and Preston and South Ribble
- Leicestershire and Rutland replaces the areas of Ashby-de-la-Zouch and Market Bosworth; Leicester, Market Harborough and Lutterworth; and Loughborough, Melton, Belvoir and Rutland
- Lincolnshire replaces the areas of East Lincolnshire, South Lincolnshire, and West Lincolnshire
- Merseyside replaces the areas of Liverpool and Knowsley, Sefton, St Helens, and Wirral
- Mid Wales replaces the areas of Brecknock and Radnorshire and Glamorgan Valleys
- Norfolk replaces the areas of Central Norfolk, North Norfolk, South Norfolk, West Norfolk, Great Yarmouth and Norwich
- North and East Devon replaces the areas of Central Devon and North Devon
- North and East Hertfordshire replaces the areas of North Hertfordshire and East Hertfordshire
- North and West Cumbria replaces the areas of North Cumbria, and West Cumbria
- North Central Wales replaces the areas of Conwy and Denbighshire
- North East London replaces the areas of Barking, Havering and Redbridge
- North East Wales replaces the areas of Wrexham Maelor and Flintshire
- North Essex replaces the areas of Mid-North Essex, North West Essex and North East Essex
- North Hampshire replaces the areas of North East Hampshire and North West Hampshire
- North Kent
- North London replaces the areas of Camden and Islington, Enfield and Haringey
- North Northumbria replaces the areas of Berwick-upon-Tweed, Mid and South East Northumberland, Newcastle and Tynedale, and North Tyneside District
- North West London replaces the areas of Barnet, Brent and Harrow Gore
- North West Wales replaces the areas of Gwynedd and Anglesey (Ynys Môn)
- North Yorkshire replaces the areas of Harrogate and Skipton, Northallerton and Richmond, Scarborough and York and Selby
- Northamptonshire replaces the areas of Corby, Kettering, and Northampton, Daventry and Towcester, and Wellingborough
- Northern Derbyshire replaces the areas of High Peak, and North East Derbyshire and Dales
- Nottinghamshire replaces the areas of Mansfield and Worksop, and Nottingham and Newark
- Oxfordshire replaces the areas of Southern Oxfordshire, Northern Oxfordshire and Oxford
- Shropshire replaces the areas of Shrewsbury and North Shropshire, and Telford and South Shropshire
- South and West Devon replaces Plymouth District and South Devon
- South Cumbria replaces the areas of Furness and District, and South Lakeland
- South East London replaces the areas of Greenwich and Lewisham, Bexley and Bromley
- South Essex replaces the areas of Mid-South Essex, South West Essex and South East Essex
- South London replaces the areas of Croydon, Lambeth and Southwark, and Sutton
- South Northumbria replaces the areas of Gateshead District, City of Sunderland and South Tyneside District
- South West London replaces the areas of Kingston, Merton, Richmond-upon-Thames and Wandsworth
- South Yorkshire replaces the areas of Barnsley District, Doncaster, Rotherham, and Sheffield
- Southern Derbyshire
- Staffordshire replaces the areas of Central and Southwest Staffordshire, North Staffordshire, and South East Staffordshire
- Suffolk replaces the areas of North East Suffolk, South East Suffolk, and West Suffolk
- Surrey replaces the areas of North Surrey, South East Surrey, and South West Surrey
- Sussex (Central)
- Sussex (Eastern)
- Teesside replaces the areas of Langbaurgh East and Teesside
- West and Central Hertfordshire replaces the areas of West Hertfordshire and Central Hertfordshire
- West Glamorgan replaces the areas of Swansea County and Neath Port Talbot
- West Hampshire replaces the areas of New Forest and Southampton
- West London replaces the areas of Ealing, Hounslow and Hillingdon
- West Sussex replaces the areas of Sussex (Northern) and Sussex (Western)
- West Yorkshire replaces the areas of Bradford and Keighley, Calderdale, Kirklees, Leeds District, and Wakefield and Pontefract
- Worcestershire replaces the areas of Bromsgrove and Redditch, Kidderminster, and South Worcestershire

== See also ==
- Magistrates' court (England and Wales)
- Courts Act 2003
- Petty sessional division
