= Magistrates' Association =

UK membership association for magistrates

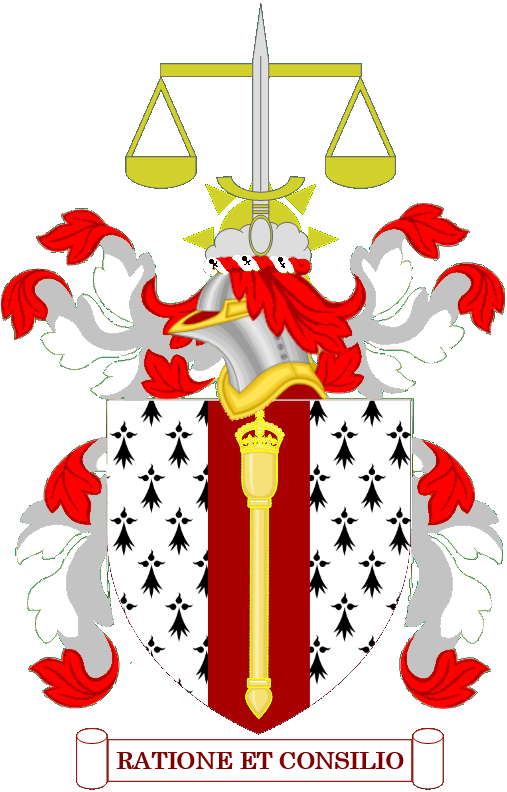
- Founded: 1921
- Type: Charitable organization
- Registration no.: England and Wales: 216066
- Purpose: Criminal Justice
- Location(s): 199 Southwark Bridge Road, London. SE1 0ED
- Coordinates: 51.486°N 0.126°W
- Region served: England and Wales
- Members: c. 28,000
- Key people: Catherine Feast (chief executive)
- Website: Magistrates' Association

The Magistrates' Association is the membership organisation for magistrates in England and Wales. By virtue of its education and training functions it is a charitable organisation and is funded by its members to promote the magistracy.

== History ==
The idea of forming an association of magistrates came from a Derby magistrate, Alderman Wilkins, in 1920. The inaugural meeting of the association was held at Central Hall, Westminster, on 28 October 1921. Lord Haldane was elected the association's first president. Thereafter the Lord Chancellor of the day was president, but when the role of the Lord Chancellor changed with the passing of the Constitutional Reform Act 2005 the Lord Chief Justice took on the role.

By 1945, membership had grown to 5,288 members, and it had 16,354 at its fiftieth Anniversary in 1970. Today, it represents over 80% of active magistrates.

It received a royal charter in October 1962.

== Objectives ==
The association was established to:

"promote the sound administration of the law by educating and instructing magistrates and others in the law, the administration of justice, the treatment of offenders and the best methods of preventing crime; and promoting discussion on developments in the law and the administration of justice."

Since 1969, it has helped to develop various sentencing guidelines. It also organises conferences and publishes a magazine, Magistrate. Members also participate in local branch activities.

The governing body is the Board of Trustees. A Council advises the Board. Various standing committees are populated by association members and focus on specific areas of magistrates' activities.

The current chair is David Ford JP.

== Publications ==
The association publishes a magazine, Magistrate (formerly The Magistrate), several times each year. It has also issued a number of reports which are available from its website. A book The Magistracy at the Crossroads was published by Waterside Press in 2012.

== Arms ==
Coat of arms of Magistrates' Association

Notes
Granted 30 May 1963
Crest
On a wreath Ermine and Gules issuant from clouds Proper and in front of a sun rising Or a sword point upwards Proper suspended from the reverse of the blade a pair of scales Gold.
Escutcheon
Ermine on a pale Gules a mace Or.
