= George Bean (judge) =

British judge (1915–1973)

Sir George Joseph Bean, OBE (19 September 1915 – 19 November 1973) was a British barrister and High Court judge who sat in the Queen’s Bench Division from 1969 until his death four years later.

Born into a Jewish family, Bean was the son of George and Phoebe Bean. He was educated at the Liverpool Institute and the University of Liverpool, where he was president of the students' union in 1937–38. He served in the British Army from 1939 to 1946, reaching the rank of colonel in the Royal Army Service Corps, and was mentioned in despatches.

Having been called to the Bar by the Middle Temple in 1940, Bean became a Queen's Counsel in 1963. He was Recorder of Carlisle from 1965 to 1969, when he was elevated to the High Court of Justice, receiving the customary knighthood. He was assigned to the Queen's Bench Division. In 1972, he was appointed to the Parole Board.

In September 1973, he suffered a heart attack while presiding over a residential seminar on sentencing for judges. He insisted on continuing the course until his alarmed colleagues forced him to go to the hospital. He died two months later at St Bartholomew's Hospital in London.

Bean was a leader of the Liverpool Jewish community, and was involved in many Jewish communal organisations.

His son is Sir David Bean, a Lord Justice of Appeal.
