= Courts board =

The courts boards were organizations within His Majesty's Courts Service in the United Kingdom which worked to improve administration of the courts system. Schedule 1 to the Courts Act 2003 made provision for the establishment of the boards. There were 21 boards across the country. The courts boards were abolished in 2012, under the plans of the coalition government as part of its 2010 economic and governmental reforms).
