= Petty sessional division =

Former subdivision in England and Wales

A petty sessional division was, in England and Wales, the area that a magistrates' court had jurisdiction over (before the abolition of quarter sessions, specifically the petty sessions). Petty sessional divisions were gradually consolidated in the 20th century (being reorganised in 1953 under the Justices of the Peace Act 1949), and were replaced by local justice areas in 2005.

Petty sessional divisions were formalised under the Division of Counties Act 1828, but they had existed informally for centuries as arrangements within the counties themselves.

The areas were reinstated by the Local Government (Petty Sessional Divisions etc.) Order 1973.

== See also ==
- misdemeanor
- Small claims court
- Petty crimes
