= National Drug Strategy =

Drug administrative governmental organization in Canberra, Australia

The National Drug Strategy (NDS) is the national drug regulation organization which maintains drug policy of the Australian Government. It began with its first framework in 1998 and has regularly formulated the Australian approach to drug education, treatment, rehabilitation, and prevention of substance abuse. It is directed by the Ministerial Drug and Alcohol Forum (MDAF) who use the NDS to implement and monitor the effectiveness of Australian drug policy at all levels of government. The MDAF consists of various elected Commonwealth and State Ministers, as well as civil servants. The aim of the NDS is to minimise the harms associated with licit and illicit drugs by reducing demand, supply, and harm in a holistic approach to the social, individual, and economic problems created by drugs. Its main function is establishing a set of policies, implemented at state and local level, that promote research-based solutions to the complex issues presented by drug use in society. The NDS has been responsible for introduction of several harm minimisation programs specifically placed in areas with a demographic deemed high-risk. Through the various iterations of the NDS it has faced increasing scrutiny over its perceived divergence from its original purpose, as well as perpetuating policies which allocate resources inefficiently.

== History ==
The original NDS began in 1998, when it produced its first document directing the policy of the Liberal government's "Tough on Drugs" campaign. However, the NDS was not the first example of a liberalised approach to drug use in Australia. The National Campaign Against Drug Abuse (NCADA), the predecessor of the NDS, was introduced by the Hawke government in 1984 as a national response to the heroin and AIDS epidemics, as well as the rapid rise of use of many forms of drugs, illicit and licit. The initial NCADA campaign was the first Australian policy formulation process to include the concept of harm minimisation, as opposed to a zero-tolerance approach. Zero-tolerance characterised earlier drug policies globally but research slowly began to demonstrate that its lacked the ability to “reduce the related harmful effects of drug abuse as much as possible”. The incorporation of harm minimisation strategies became an applauded element of the NCADA as it advised perceiving detrimental drug use as a health issue as well as a criminal issue. This combination of judiciary and health in drug policy was considered a positive and radical step, especially in contrast to the aggressive war on drugs in America in the 1970s. Policy experts noted how “it provided a basis for consultation and cooperation among health, education and law enforcement agencies”. This was the origin of research-based strategies as a foundation of the NDS. Harm minimisation remained the core element of drug policy in Australia for the duration of the NCADA as well as when it morphed into the NDS. The NCADA was renamed the NDS in 1993, but its NCADA-based format did not change. Then, in 1998, the NDS reworked its policy framework into a form similar to the frameworks used today. Official strategic frameworks produced by the NDS were reissued in 2004, 2010, and 2017. They all promote holistic harm minimisation through three pillars: demand reduction, supply reduction, and harm reduction.

== Current setting ==
The current framework of the NDS is from 2017 and will be in effect until 2026. Akin to previous frameworks produced by the NDS, harm minimisation remains the focus of this document with the three pillars aiming to provide a balanced policy approach. The language of the framework mimics previous NDS documents. The focus of this framework lies on specific groups with a higher perceived risk of harm from drugs, as well as an increased attention to certain drugs. Notable groups include Aboriginal and Torres Strait Islander People, people with mental health conditions, and people who identify as lesbian, gay, bisexual, transgender, and/or intersex. This focus exists due to the data indicating that these groups have a higher risk of drug abuse and are less resourced to combat this high risk. Drugs that have been identified as a priority are methamphetamines, alcohol, tobacco, cannabis, opioids, and new psychoactive substances. The MDAF has several current policy documents that branch directly from the NDS. These strategies attempt to build on the priorities of the NDS by addressing problematic communities and drug problems. Current strategies in action that are facilitated by the NDS include:

- National Aboriginal and Torres Strait Islander Peoples Drug Strategy
- National Ice Action Strategy
- National Fetal Alcohol Spectrum Disorder Strategic Action Plan
- National Tobacco Strategy
- National Alcohol and other Drug Workforce Development Strategy
- Consultation Draft National Alcohol Strategy.

It is the stated intention of the NDS that this current framework would remain unchanged for a decade as a reflection of the Australian Government and the MDAF's unchanging commitment to harm minimisation.

== Effects ==
The effects of the various NDS frameworks on the Australian healthcare and education systems is considerable. Initially, however, the most prominent effect was the early adoption of harm minimisation into drug policy. The effect of this can be seen in harm minimisation implementation, such as the Medically Supervised Injecting Centre in Kings Cross, Sydney, as well as over 3500 safe Needle and Syringe programs in all major Australian cities. Increasing drug education fits into both harm minimisation and demand minimisation and has accordingly been adopted by state education systems across Australia. Life Ready, in NSW, is one such example of an education syllabus informed by the NDS. A 25-hour course, it endeavours to encourage students to “plan, develop and evaluate strategies to support the independence, health, safety and wellbeing of self and others” Within this are tools and strategies to minimise the harm associated with drugs. Another effect of the NDS is a greater insight into the drug habits of Australians through their Household Survey. The results of the survey are essential to the NDS continuing to adapt their policy to the Australian drug landscape.

== National Drug Strategy Household Survey ==
The NDS Household Survey is the main interaction of the Australian Government with the population in terms of drug use. The collection is supervised by the Australian Institute of Health and Welfare in conjunction with the Department of Health. It has been conducted since the inception of the NDS in 1998. Its target audience ranges from teenagers to pensioners and aims to form a complete picture of Australian drug usage, taking into account a range of licit and illicit drugs, and the frequency of use. Fieldwork for the Survey has been conducted by Roy Morgan Research every three years since 2007.

== Criticism ==
The main criticisms of the NDS have slowly developed as the outcomes of the strategies have been realised. The main academic critique of NDS policy has been the divide between its written commitment to harm minimisation and outcomes that don't reflect a commitment to harm minimisation. In 2010, over two thirds of illicit drug expenditure was spent on law enforcement. In an assessment of the impact of drug use on families, former speaker of the house Bronwyn Bishop noted that the NDS should “continue its allocation of significant resources to policing activity as [it is] a highly effective prevention method”. This does not reflect the emphasis that harm minimisation policy puts on healthcare for drug users. In contrast, experts from the National Drug and Alcohol Research Centre suggest that a “public health perspective” the opposite of what Bishop was proposing, “would… address information and strategies that promote greater safety for those who choose to experiment”, rather than promoting the criminality of the use of certain drugs.
