= Crime and disorder reduction partnership =

Local partnership in England and Wales

A crime and disorder reduction partnership (CDRP) in England, or a community safety partnership in Wales, is one of a number of statutory local partnerships in England and Wales, and was established by the Crime and Disorder Act 1998 to co-ordinate action on crime and disorder.

CDRP partners include the police, local authorities, probation service, health authorities, social landlords, the voluntary sector, and local residents and businesses.
