= Immigration Services Tribunal =

The Immigration Services Tribunal was a tribunal in the United Kingdom created by the Immigration and Asylum Act 1999 to hear:

- appeals from decisions of the Immigration Services Commissioner
- disciplinary charges laid by the Immigration Services Commissioner under paragraph 9(1)(e) of Schedule 5 to the Immigration and Asylum Act 1999.

The Tribunal was abolished in January 2010 and its functions transferred to the First-tier Tribunal.
