= HM Courts and Tribunals Service =

Executive agency of the UK government

His Majesty's Courts and Tribunals Service

Agency overview
- Formed: 2011; 15 years ago
- Preceding agencies: Her Majesty's Courts Service; Tribunals Service
- Type: Executive agency
- Jurisdiction: All courts and tribunals in England and Wales; Non-devolved tribunals in Scotland and Northern Ireland
- Headquarters: 102 Petty France London, SW1
- Employees: 16,265
- Annual budget: £2 billion (gross expenditure 2019–2020)
- Minister responsible: Sarah Sackman MP, Minister of State for Courts and Legal Services
- Agency executive: Megan Lee-Devlin, Chief Executive
- Parent department: Ministry of Justice
- Key document: Framework document
- Website: gov.uk/hmcts

Map
- England and Wales in the UK and Europe

His Majesty's Courts and Tribunals Service (commonly HM Courts and Tribunals Service or HMCTS) is an executive agency of the Ministry of Justice. It was created on 1 April 2011 (as Her Majesty's Courts and Tribunals Service) by the merger of Her Majesty's Courts Service and the Tribunals Service.

The agency is responsible for the administration of the courts of England and Wales, the Probate Service and tribunals in England and Wales and non-devolved tribunals in Scotland and Northern Ireland. It works from about 600 locations across the United Kingdom.

== Role ==
The organisation's Framework Document says its aim is "to run an efficient and effective courts and tribunals system, which enables the rule of law to be upheld and provides access to justice for all." The courts over which it has responsibility are the Court of Appeal, the High Court, the Crown Court, the magistrates' courts, and the county courts.

The agency is responsible for the administration of all chambers of the First-tier Tribunal and Upper Tribunal, together with the employment tribunals and certain other tribunals which the Tribunals Service was responsible for serving, such as the Special Immigration Appeals Commission and Proscribed Organisations Appeal Commission.

The Supreme Court of the United Kingdom is not administered by HMCTS, as it is a UK-wide court, as opposed to an English and Welsh one. Its administration is under a Chief Executive who is appointed by the President of the Supreme Court of the United Kingdom.

== Accountability ==
The service remains operationally independent, and the responsibility for overseeing the leadership and direction of the agency rests with its Board, three of whose members are judicial officeholders and one of whom is Senior Presiding Judge. The Chief Executive is responsible for the day-to-day operations and administration of the agency, and is the Accounting Officer for the agency.

The Lord Chancellor is required by section 1 of the Courts Act 2003 and section 39 of the Tribunals, Courts and Enforcement Act 2007 to ensure there is an efficient and effective system to support the carrying on of the business of courts and tribunals, and it is to the Lord Chancellor that the agency is accountable, and the Lord Chancellor is in turn responsible for accounting for its operations to Parliament.

HMCTS is an executive agency, in contrast with the Scottish Courts and Tribunals Service which is a non-ministerial government department. However, it is unique in being such an agency and having constitutional accountability to judges as well as the Lord Chancellor. The framework document says that the agency is accountable to the Lord Chief Justice of England and Wales and the Senior President of Tribunals. This provides a unique partnership between all three in relation to the effective governance, financing and operation of His Majesty's Courts and Tribunals Service. For example, where the Board cannot reach agreement, its chair will refer the issue in question to the Lord Chancellor and the Lord Chief Justice for a decision.

Any amendment of the framework document must be agreed between all parties, and laid before Parliament. Furthermore, the Lord Chief Justice (and the Senior President) is entitled to terminate the partnership if either concludes that it is no longer compatible with his constitutional position or the independence of the judiciary. By doing so, a report will be presented before both Houses of Parliament of that fact, and the governance of HMCTS will revert to a conventional agency model reporting directly to the Lord Chancellor unless and until a new model is agreed between the Lord Chancellor and Lord Chief Justice or a different legislative framework is put in place.

== Money Claim Online ==
Money Claim Online (MCOL) is a UK government Internet-based service by His Majesty's Courts and Tribunals Service for claimants and defendants in England and Wales. It states that it is "a convenient and secure way of making or responding to a money claim on the Internet". The claim must be made by a single claimant against at most two people or organisations, and is normally for a fixed amount.

You can make a money claim if you think a person or organisation owes you money and will not pay you back. You'll have to pay a fee [5–10% of claim]. Before making a claim, contact the person or organisation to try to resolve the issue by discussion or mediation. Your claim, including your name and address, will be sent to the person you say owes you money. They'll get a chance to respond to your claim.

Civil Procedure Rule Practice Direction 7E describes the Money Claim Service in more detail.

== Chief executives ==
- Peter Handcock, 2011 – January 2015 (previously chief executive of the Tribunals Service)
- Natalie Ceeney, January 2015 – May 2016
- Kevin Sadler, May 2016 – November 2016 (interim chief executive)
- Susan Acland-Hood, November 2016 – August 2020
- Kevin Sadler, August 2020 – March 2022 (acting chief executive)
- Nick Goodwin, March 2022 – August 2026
- Megan Lee-Devlin, since August 2026

== Interpreter service ==
The service privatised their language interpretation service in 2011, giving a contract to Capita Translation and Interpreting. Figures released to The Guardian in 2016 show that more than 2,600 court cases were adjourned because of a failure to provide an adequate interpreter in the previous five years.

From 31 October 2016 these services have been delivered under four separate lots through the following providers:

- Lot 1 – spoken face to face, telephone and video interpretation – thebigword Group Ltd
- Lot 2 – translation and transcription services – thebigword Group Ltd
- Lot 3 – non-spoken languages – Clarion UK Ltd
- Lot 4 – quality assurance services – The Language Shop

Most translation into Welsh and Welsh-English interpretation is sourced through HMCTS' own Welsh Language Unit.

Statistics on the use of language interpreter and translation services in courts and tribunals forms part of the quarterly criminal court statistics.
