= Courts Act 2003 =

Act of the Parliament of the United Kingdom

Courts Act 2003 (Note: Section 112.)
- Act of Parliament
- Parliament of the United Kingdom
- Long title: An Act to make provision about the courts and their procedure and practice; about judges and magistrates; about fines and the enforcement processes of the courts; about periodical payments of damages; and for connected purposes.
- Citation: 2003 c. 39
- Territorial extent: England and Wales (Note: Section 111.)

Dates
- Royal assent: 20 November 2003
- Commencement: Various (Note: Section 110.)
Other legislation
Amends	Act of Settlement 1701; Metropolitan Police Act 1839; Ordnance Survey Act 1841; Defence Act 1842; London Hackney Carriages Act 1843; Railways Clauses Consolidation Act 1845; Offences Against the Person Act 1861; Dockyard Ports Regulation Act 1865; Newspapers, Printers, and Reading Rooms Repeal Act 1869; Promissory Oaths Act 1871; Commons Act 1876; Municipal Corporations Act 1882; Explosive Substances Act 1883; Sheriffs Act 1887; Local Government Act 1888; Indictments Act 1915; Prevention of Damage by Pests Act 1949; Manœuvres Act 1958; Obscene Publications Act 1959; Road Traffic Act 1960; Administration of Justice Act 1964; Science and Technology Act 1965; Public Works Loans Act 1965; Courts-Martial (Appeals) Act 1968; Administration of Justice Act 1970; Courts Act 1971; Attachment of Earnings Act 1971; Immigration Act 1971; Criminal Justice Act 1972; Solicitors Act 1974; Bail Act 1976; Administration of Justice Act 1977; Criminal Law Act 1977; Domestic Proceedings and Magistrates' Courts Act 1978; Judicature (Northern Ireland) Act 1978; Protection of Children Act 1978; Magistrates' Courts Act 1980; Criminal Appeal (Northern Ireland) Act 1980; Senior Courts Act 1981; Civil Jurisdiction and Judgments Act 1982; Cinemas Act 1985; Company Directors Disqualification Act 1986; Fire Safety and Safety of Places of Sport Act 1987; Criminal Justice Act 1988; Football Spectators Act 1989; Statute Law (Repeals) Act 1989; Town and Country Planning Act 1990; Planning (Listed Buildings and Conservation Areas) Act 1990; Planning (Consequential Provisions) Act 1990; Courts and Legal Services Act 1990; Social Security Administration Act 1992; Protection of Badgers Act 1992; Judicial Pensions and Retirement Act 1993; Value Added Tax Act 1994; Drug Trafficking Act 1994; Jobseekers Act 1995; Police Act 1996; Youth Justice and Criminal Evidence Act 1999; Terrorism Act 2000; International Criminal Court Act 2001
Repeals/revokes	Justices of the Peace Act 1997; Criminal Justice and Court Services Act 2000
Amended by	Mental Capacity Act 2005; Violent Crime Reduction Act 2006; Crime and Courts Act 2013; Criminal Justice and Courts Act 2015; Modern Slavery Act 2015; Courts and Tribunals Act 2018; Sentencing Act 2020; Domestic Abuse Act 2021; Police, Crime, Sentencing and Courts Act 2022; Tobacco and Vapes Act 2026

Status: Amended

Text of statute as originally enacted

Revised text of statute as amended

The Courts Act 2003 (c. 39) is an act of the Parliament of the United Kingdom implementing many of the recommendations in Sir Robin Auld's (a Court of Appeal judge) Review of the Criminal Courts in England and Wales (also known as the "Auld Review"). The White Paper which preceded the act was published by the Home Office on the 17 July 2002 and called "Justice for All".

The act has nine parts:

- Maintenance of the court system
- Justices of the peace
- Magistrates' courts
- Court security
- Inspectors of court administration
- Judges
- Procedure rules and practice directions
- Miscellaneous
- Final provisions (technical provisions)

The act deals predominantly with criminal courts' administration, though certain sections deal with civil matters (notably creating a post of "Head of Civil Justice", enabling provisions for family procedure rules, and amendments to its civil procedure equivalent).

The act also abolished magistrates' courts committees, combining the magistrates' courts' administration with the Court Service, which was then renamed Her Majesty's Courts Service. "Fines Officers" are instituted in order to strengthen the system for collecting fines after the existing system was criticised for relative ineffectiveness. Schedule 1 of the act provided for the establishment of courts boards.

Sections 50 to 57 of this act also provide court security officers the power of search, seizure/retention of items, restraint and removal from court when performing their duties.

The act introduces a power to make costs orders against third parties in criminal proceedings - this can be used to charge media organisations for the costs of retrial caused by media publication.

The act introduced uniformed security officers with the power to search, detain, and eject people.

The act also transfers the authority and obligation of high sheriffs, in relation to civil writs, to sheriff's officers; previously, high sheriffs had delegated these to the sheriff's officers, in any case, but the Blair Ministry preferred to make this explicit, and remove the theoretical power of the high sheriff. It also renames this more-than-1000-year-old role - the sheriff's officer - to High court enforcement officers, for reasons that have not been explained, except perhaps to give it a modern-sounding name.
