= HM Courts Service =

Agency formerly responsible for Courts administration in England and Wales

Her Majesty's Courts Service

Executive agency overview
- Formed: 1 April 2005
- Dissolved: 1 April 2011
- Superseding Executive agency: Her Majesty's Courts and Tribunals Service

Her Majesty's Courts Service (HMCS) was an executive agency of the Ministry of Justice (MoJ). It was responsible for the administration of the civil, family and criminal courts in England and Wales.

It was created by the amalgamation of the Magistrates' Courts Service and the Court Service as a result of the Unified Courts Administration Programme. It came into being on 1 April 2005, bringing together the Magistrates' Courts Service and the Courts Service into a single organisation. On 1 April 2011, it merged with the Tribunals Service to form Her Majesty's Courts and Tribunals Service.

== HMCS structure ==
Her Majesty's Courts Service carried out the administration and support for the Court of Appeal, the High Court, the Crown Court, the magistrates' courts, the County Court and the Probate Service in England and Wales.

When established court services were administered by seven regions responsible for 42 local areas. In 2007 this structure was re-organised by reducing the number of areas to 24. The areas were managed by area directors, responsible for the delivery of local services. They worked in partnership with courts boards with the aim of "customer focus" and meeting local needs.

On 1 April 2011, it merged with the Tribunals Service to form Her Majesty's Courts and Tribunals Service, with the aim of reducing costs.

== Unified Courts Administration Programme ==
The Government White Paper "Justice for all", published in 2002, recommended that a single agency should be developed to support the delivery of justice in all courts in England and Wales, instead of the magistrates' courts and the Court Service being administered separately.

The Courts Act 2003 created the legal framework required to make the changes. The focus of the programme was to devise a system which would offer improved and consistent services to court users by providing:

- A single national agency solely responsible for the delivery of court services with improved and more consistent level of service to court users
- More resources available to support the delivery of justice
- Greater flexibility in the use of court buildings.

On 31 March 2005, responsibility for the 42 existing magistrates' courts committees and Court Service passed to Her Majesty’s Courts Service.

== See also ==
- Departments of the United Kingdom Government
- Courts of England and Wales
- List of Courts in England and Wales
- Northern Ireland Courts and Tribunals Service
- Scottish Courts and Tribunals Service
