= Illegal drug trade =

Global black market

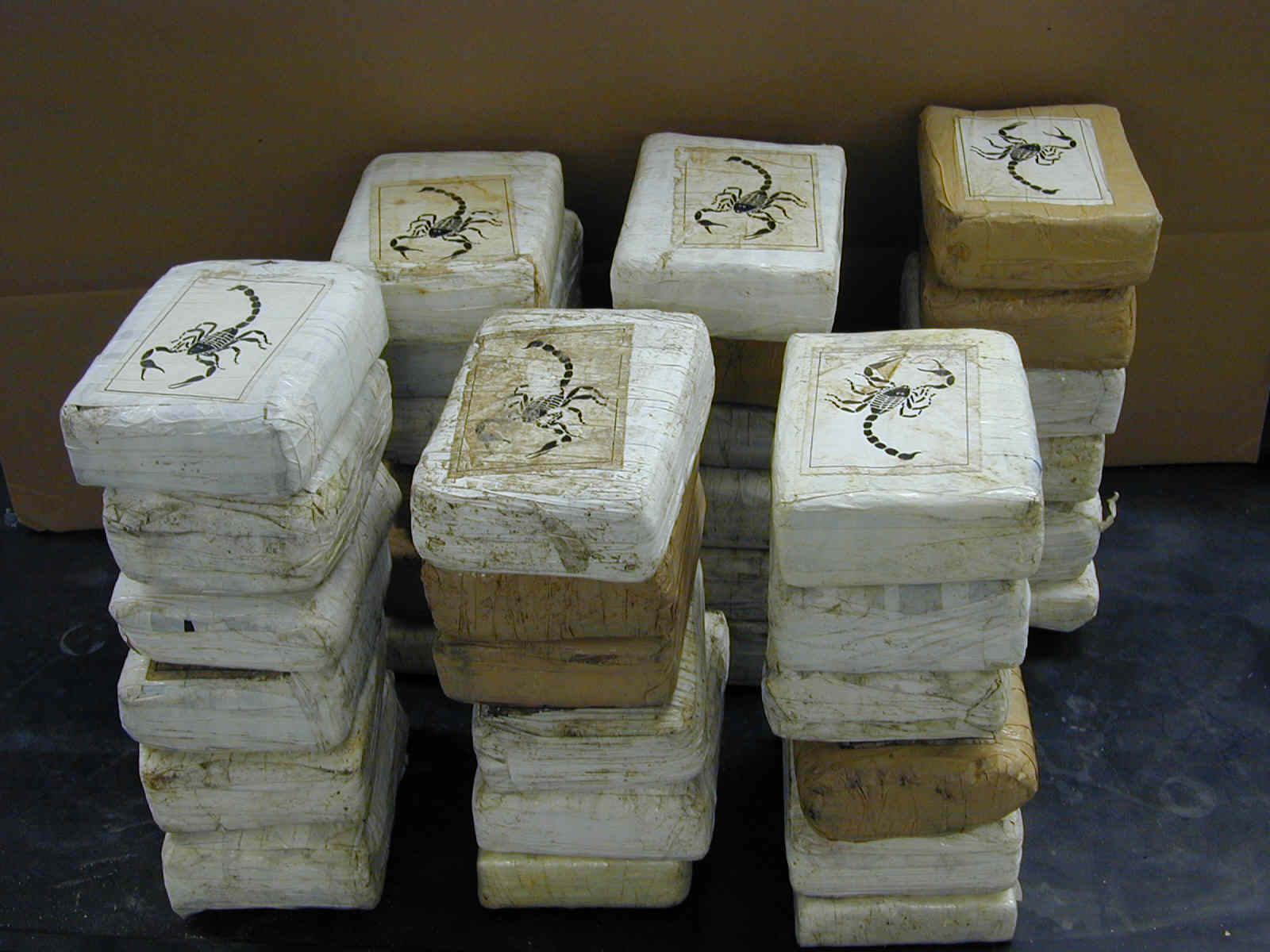
Bricks of cocaine, a form in which it is commonly transported.

The illegal drug trade is the global black market dedicated to the cultivation, manufacture, distribution, and sale of prohibited drugs. The terms drug trafficking and narcotrafficking are also commonly used to describe the trade of the illicit substances. A majority of jurisdictions prohibit trade, except under license, of many types of drugs through the use of drug prohibition laws. The think tank Global Financial Integrity's Transnational Crime and the Developing World report estimates the size of the global illicit drug market between US$426 and US$652 billion in 2014. With a world GDP of US$78 trillion in the same year, the illegal drug trade may be estimated as nearly 1% of total global trade. Consumption of illegal drugs is widespread globally, and it remains very difficult for local authorities to reduce the rates of drug consumption.

== History ==
Prior to the 20th century, governments rarely made a major effort to proscribe recreational drug use, though several smoking bans were passed by authorities in Europe and Asia during the early modern era. Tobacco and opium were the two first drugs to be subject to prohibitory government legislation, with officials in New Spain, the Ottoman Empire, Germany, Austria and the Russian Empire passing laws against smoking tobacco; the government of the Qing dynasty issued edicts banning opium smoking in 1730, 1796 and 1800. Beginning in the 18th century, the East India Company (EIC) began to smuggle Indian opium to Chinese merchants, resulting in the creation of an illegal drug trade in China. By 1838, there were between four and 12 million opium addicts in China, and Qing officials responded by strengthening their suppression of the illegal opium trade. Incidents such as the destruction of opium at Humen led to the outbreak of the First Opium War between China and Britain in 1839; the 1842 Treaty of Nanking ending the war did not legalize the importation of opium into China, but Western merchants continued to smuggle the drug to Chinese merchants in ever-increasing amounts. The 1858 Treaty of Tianjin, which ended the Second Opium War, stipulated that the Qing government would open several ports to foreign trade, including opium.

Western governments began prohibiting addictive drugs during the late 19th and early 20th centuries. In 1868, as a result of the increased use of opium in Britain, the British government restricted the sale of opium by implementing the 1868 Pharmacy Act. In the United States, control of opium remained under the control of individual US states until the introduction of the Harrison Act in 1914, after 12 international powers signed the First International Opium Convention in 1912. Between 1920 and c. 1933, the Eighteenth Amendment to the United States Constitution banned alcohol in the United States. Prohibition proved almost impossible to enforce and resulted in the rise of organized crime, including the modern American Mafia, which identified enormous business opportunities in the manufacturing, smuggling and sale of illicit liquor.

The beginning of the 21st century saw drug use increase in North America and Europe, with a particularly increased demand for cannabis and cocaine. As a result, international organized crime syndicates such as the Sinaloa Cartel and 'Ndrangheta have increased cooperation among each other in order to facilitate trans-Atlantic drug-trafficking. Use of another illicit drug, hashish, has also increased in Europe. Drug trafficking is widely regarded by lawmakers as a serious offense around the world. Penalties often depend on the type of drug (and its classification in the country into which it is being trafficked), the quantity trafficked, where the drugs are sold and how they are distributed. If the drugs are sold to underage people, then the penalties for trafficking may be harsher than in other circumstances.

Drug smuggling carries severe penalties in many countries. Sentencing may include lengthy periods of incarceration, flogging and even the death penalty (in Singapore, Malaysia, Indonesia and elsewhere). In December 2005, Van Tuong Nguyen, a 25-year-old Australian drug smuggler, was hanged in Singapore after being convicted in March 2004. In 2010, two people were sentenced to death in Malaysia for trafficking 1 kilogram (2.2 lb) of cannabis into the country. Execution is mostly used as a deterrent, and many have called upon much more effective measures to be taken by countries to tackle drug trafficking; for example, targeting specific criminal organisations that are often also active in the smuggling of other goods (i.e. wildlife) and even people. In many cases, links between politicians and the criminal organisations have been proven to exist. In June 2021, Interpol revealed an operation in 92 countries that shut down 113,000 websites and online marketplaces selling counterfeit or illicit medicines and medical products a month earlier, led to the arrests of 227 people worldwide, recovered pharmaceutical products worth $23 million, and led to the seizure of approximately nine million devices and drugs, including large quantities of fake COVID-19 tests and face masks.

In 2025, by executive order, the United States expanded its approach in its counter drug campaign to designate foreign drug cartels as foreign terrorist organizations. This gave the United States military broad authority to employ military force against drug cartels and to target their leaders through direct military action.

== Societal effects ==
The countries of drug production and transit are some of the most affected by the trade, though countries receiving the illegally imported substances are also adversely affected. For example, Ecuador has absorbed up to 300,000 refugees from Colombia who are running from guerrillas, paramilitaries and drug lords. While some applied for asylum, others are still illegal immigrants. The drugs that pass from Colombia through Ecuador to other parts of South America create economic and social problems.

Honduras, through which an estimated 79% of cocaine passes on its way to the United States, had—as of 2011—the highest murder rate in the world. According to the International Crisis Group, the most violent regions in Central America, particularly along the Guatemala–Honduras border, are highly correlated with an abundance of drug trafficking activity.

=== Violent crime ===
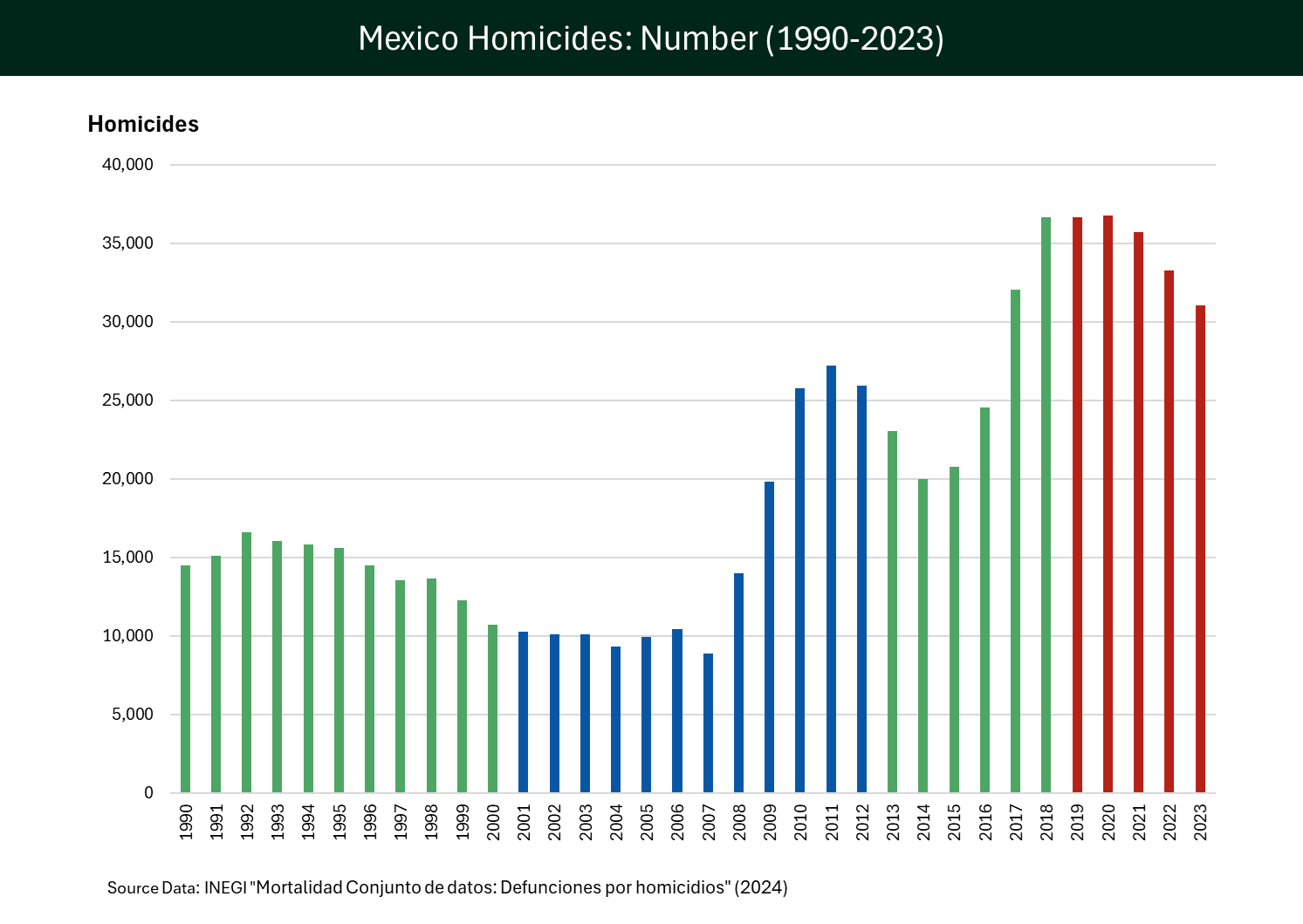
Total homicides in Mexico (1990–2023)

In several countries, the illegal drug trade is thought to be directly linked to violent crimes such as murder and gun violence. This is especially true in all developing countries, such as Honduras, but is also an issue for many developed countries worldwide. In the late 1990s in the United States, the Federal Bureau of Investigation estimated that 5% of murders were drug-related. In Colombia, drug violence can be caused by factors such as the economy, poor governments, and no authority within law enforcement.

After a crackdown by US and Mexican authorities in the first decade of the 21st century as part of tightened border security in the wake of the September 11 attacks, border violence inside Mexico surged. The Mexican government estimated that 90% of the killings were drug-related.

A report by the UK government's Drug Strategy Unit that was leaked to the press, stated that due to the expensive price of highly addictive drugs heroin and cocaine, drug use was responsible for the great majority of crime, including 85% of shoplifting, 70–80% of burglaries and 54% of robberies. It concluded "[t]he cost of crime committed to support illegal cocaine and heroin habits amounts to £16 billion a year in the UK"

== Drug trafficking routes ==
US Coast Guard video of drug smugglers in high-speed boat dumping 2,300 pounds (1,000 kg) of cocaine in Eastern Pacific Ocean

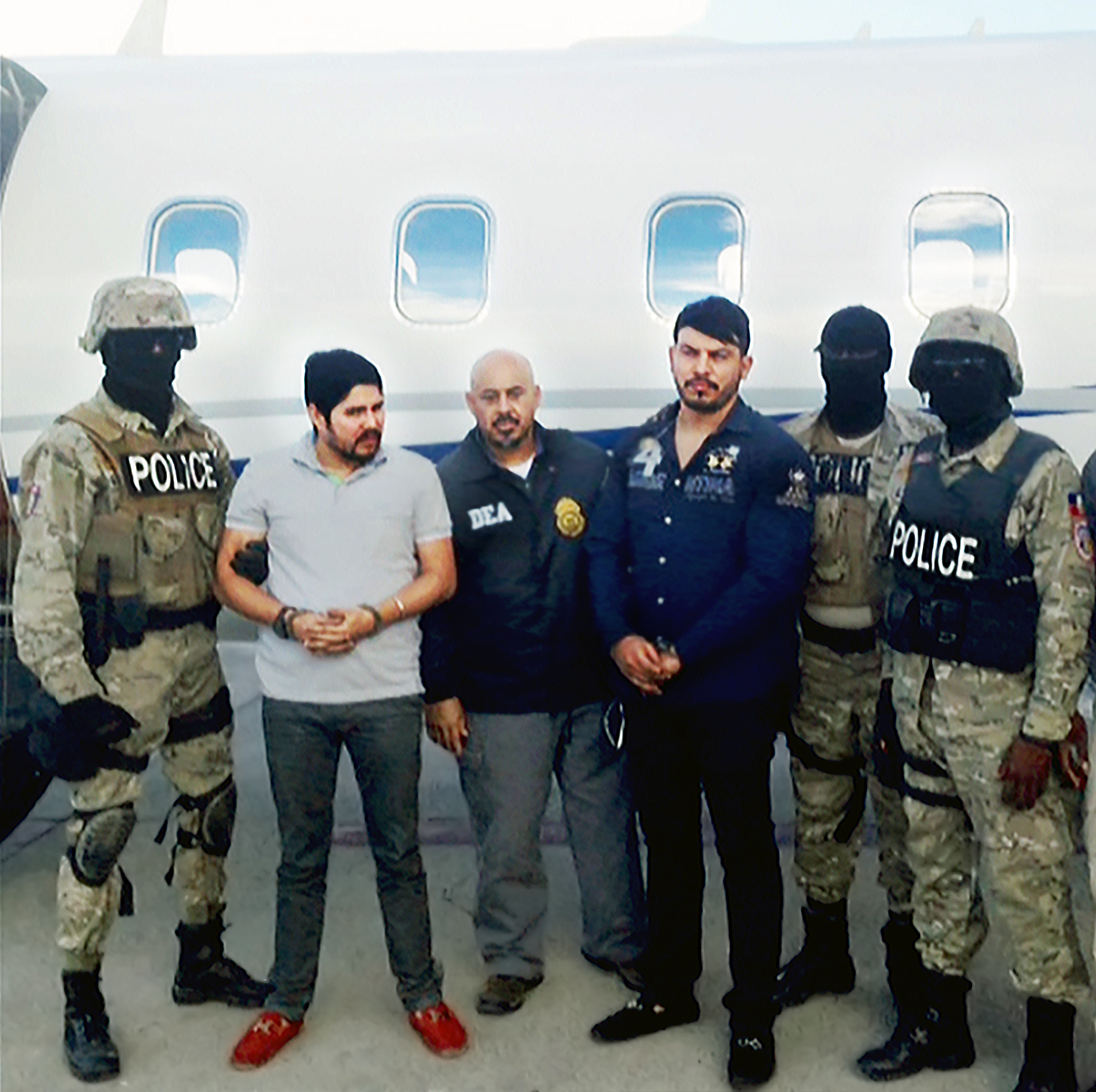
The nephews of former Venezuelan President Nicolás Maduro, Efraín Antonio Campo Flores and Francisco Flores de Freitas, after their arrest by the US Drug Enforcement Administration on 10 November 2015

=== Africa ===
==== East and South ====
Heroin is increasingly trafficked from Afghanistan to Europe and America through eastern and southern African countries. This path is known as the "southern route" or "smack track". Repercussions of this trade include burgeoning heroin use and political corruption in intermediary African nations.

==== West ====
Cocaine produced in Colombia and Bolivia has increasingly been shipped via West Africa (especially in Nigeria, Cape Verde, Guinea-Bissau, Cameroon, Mali, Benin, Togo, and Ghana). The money is often laundered in countries such as Nigeria, Ghana, and Senegal.

According to the Africa Economic Institute, the value of illicit drug smuggling in Guinea-Bissau is almost twice the value of the country's GDP. Police officers are often bribed. A police officer's normal monthly wage of $106 is less than 2% of the value of 1 kilogram (2.2 lb) of cocaine (€7000 or $9978). The money can also be laundered using real estate. A house is built using illegal funds—and when the house is sold—legal money is earned. When drugs are sent over land, through the Sahara, the drug traders have been forced to cooperate with terrorist organizations, such as al-Qaeda in the Islamic Maghreb.

=== Asia ===
Drugs in Asia traditionally traveled the southern routes – the main caravan axes of Southeast Asia and Southern China – and include the former opium-producing countries of Thailand, Iran, and Pakistan. After the 1990s, particularly after the end of the Cold War (1991), borders were opened and trading and customs agreements were signed so that the routes expanded to include China, Central Asia, and Russia. There are, therefore, diversified drug trafficking routes available today, particularly in the heroin trade and these thrive due to the continuous development of new markets. A large amount of drugs are smuggled into Europe from Asia. The main sources of these drugs are Afghanistan, along with countries that constituted the so-called Golden Crescent. From these producers, drugs are smuggled into the West and Central Asia to its destinations in Europe and the United States. Iran is now a common route for smugglers, having been previously a primary trading route, due to its large-scale and costly war against drug trafficking. The Border Police Chief of Iran said that his country "is a strong barrier against the trafficking of illegal drugs to Caucasus, especially the Republic of Azerbaijan." The drugs produced by the Golden Triangle of Myanmar, Laos, and Thailand, on the other hand, pass through the southern routes to feed the Australian, US, and Asian markets.

=== South America ===
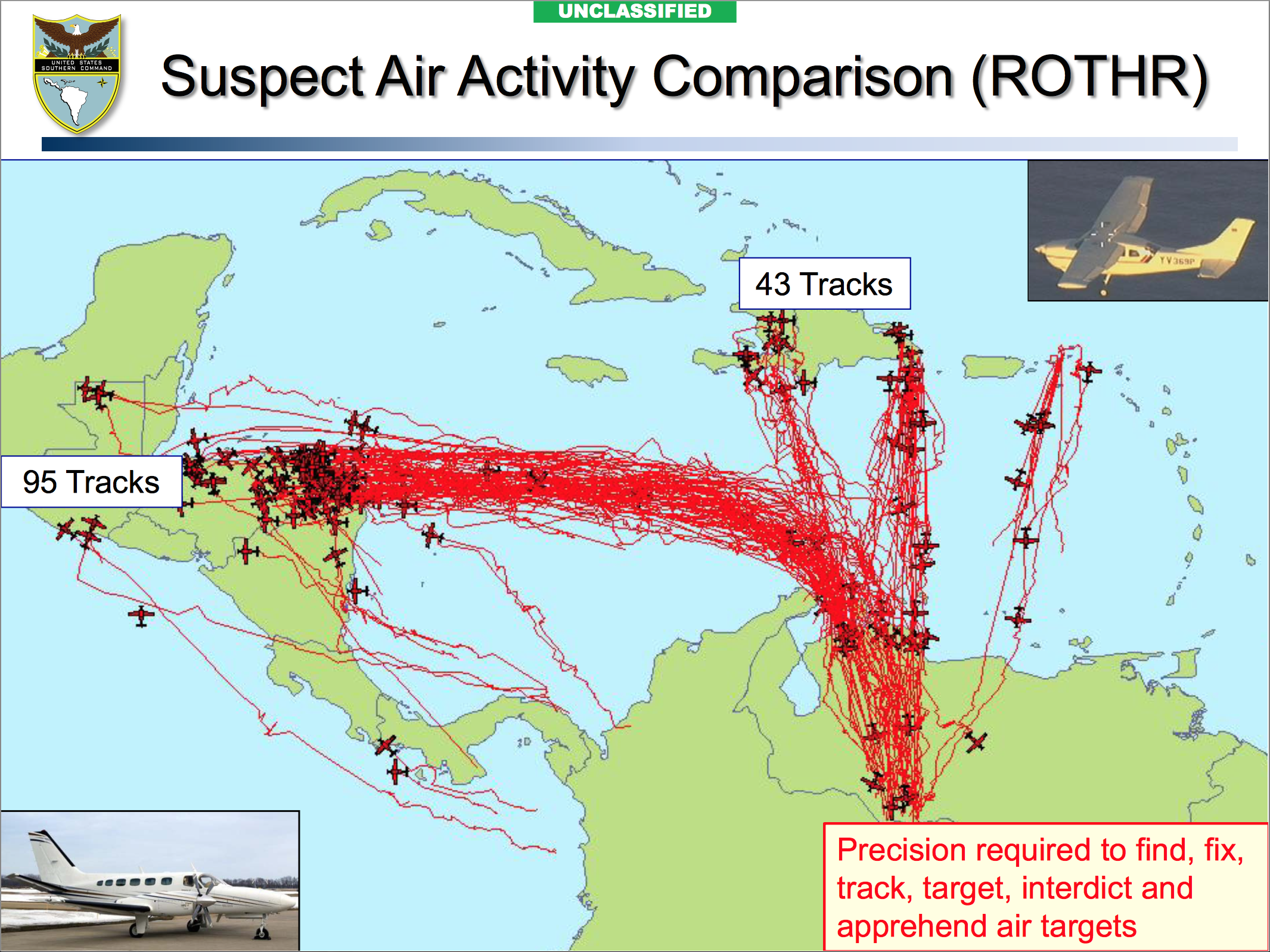
Drug trafficking air routes in South America monitored by the United States Southern Command

Venezuela has been a path to the United States and Europe for illegal drugs originating in Colombia, through Central America, Mexico and Caribbean countries such as Haiti, the Dominican Republic, and Puerto Rico.

According to the United Nations, cocaine trafficking through Venezuela increased from 2002 to 2008. In 2005, the government of Hugo Chávez severed ties with the United States Drug Enforcement Administration (DEA), accusing its representatives of spying. Following the departure of the DEA from Venezuela and the expansion of the DEA's partnership with Colombia in 2005, Venezuela became more attractive to drug traffickers. Between 2008 and 2012, Venezuela's cocaine seizure ranking among other countries declined, going from being ranked fourth in the world for cocaine seizures in 2008 to sixth in the world in 2012.

On 18 November 2016, following what was known as the Narcosobrinos incident, Venezuelan President Nicolás Maduro's two nephews were found guilty of trying to ship drugs into the United States so they could "obtain a large amount of cash to help their family stay in power".

According to a research conducted by the Israel-based Abba Eban Institute as part of an initiative called Janus Initiative, the main routes that Hezbollah uses for smuggling drugs are from Colombia, Venezuela and Brazil into West Africa and then transported through northern Africa into Europe. This route serves Hezbollah in making a profit in the cocaine smuggling market in order to leverage it for their activities.

In September 2025, the U.S. launched a war-like effort and attacked three boats from alleged Venezuelan drug traffickers, killing several people without providing any evidence. According to DEA and UN information, Venezuela is globally not a major exporter of cocaine. The large majority of cocaine enters the U.S. via Colombia and Mexico. The Trump administration announced further military strikes inside Venezuela. The actions were criticised as misplaced since they have little impact on the flow of fentanyl, the leading cause of overdose deaths in the United States.

== Online trafficking ==
Drugs are increasingly traded online on the dark web on darknet markets. Internet-based drug trafficking is the global distribution of narcotics, making extensive use of technology. Similarly, the use of the Internet for the illegal trafficking of two controlled categories of drugs can also be identified as Internet-related drug trafficking. The platform Silk Road provided goods and services to 100,000 buyers before being shut down in October 2013. This prompted the creation of new platforms such as Silk Road 2.0, which were also shut down.

== Profits ==
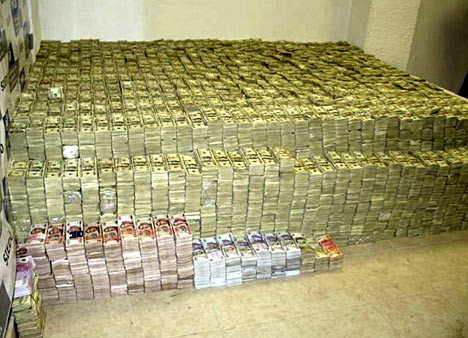
US$207 million and additional amounts in other currencies were confiscated from Mexican Zhenli Ye Gon in 2007.

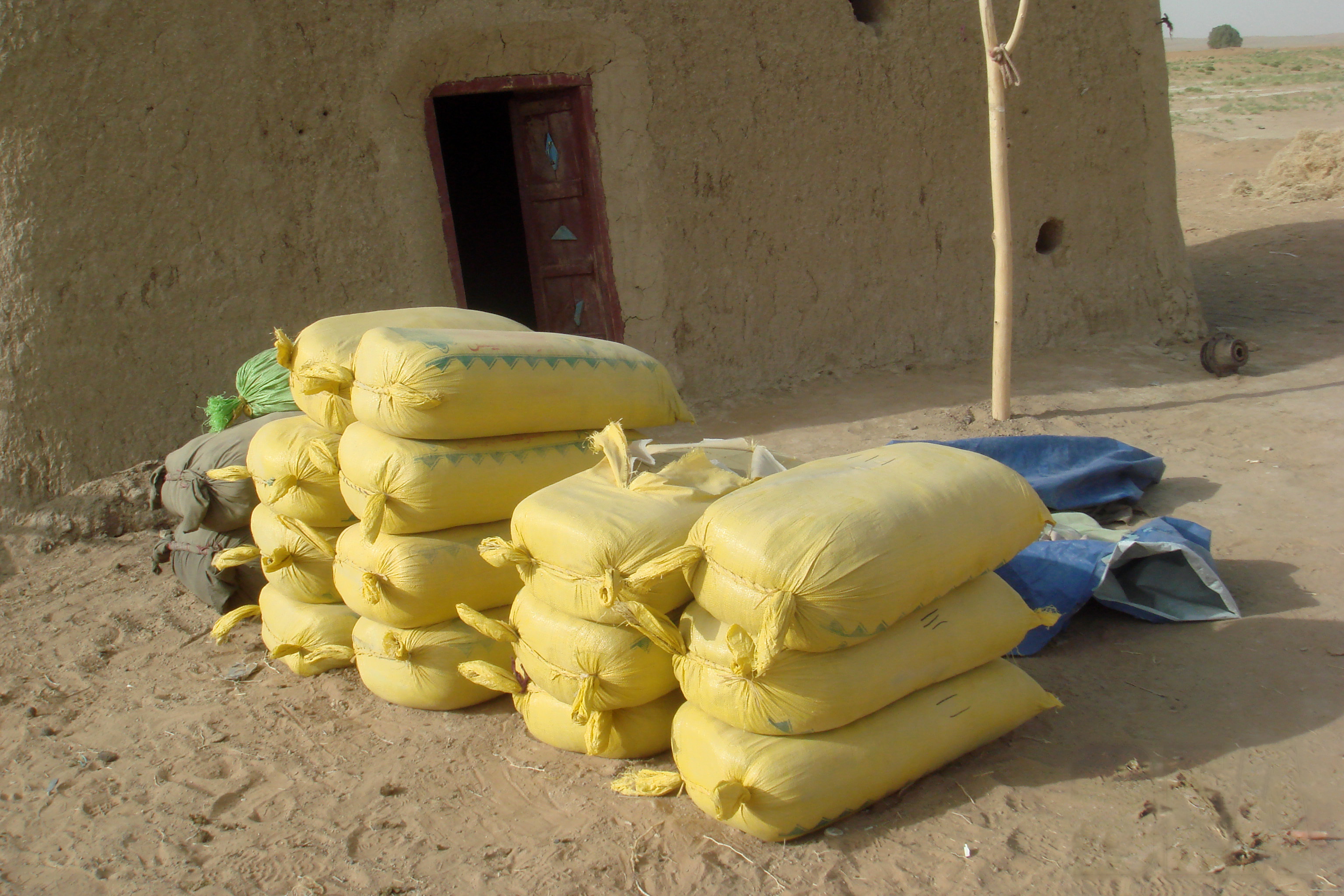
Hashish seized in Operation Albatross, a joint operation of Afghan officials, NATO, and the DEA

Statistics about profits from the drug trade are largely unknown and speculative due to its illicit nature. An online report published by the UK Home Office in 2007 estimated the illicit drug market in the UK at £4–6.6 billion a year.

In December 2009, United Nations Office on Drugs and Crime Executive Director Antonio Maria Costa claimed illegal drug money saved the banking industry from collapse. He claimed he had seen evidence that the proceeds of organized crime were "the only liquid investment capital" available to some banks on the brink of collapse during 2008. He said that a majority of the $352 billion (£216bn) of drug profits was absorbed into the economic system as a result:

"In many instances, the money from drugs was the only liquid investment capital. In the second half of 2008, liquidity was the banking system's main problem and hence liquid capital became an important factor ... Inter-bank loans were funded by money that originated from the drugs trade and other illegal activities...there were signs that some banks were rescued that way".

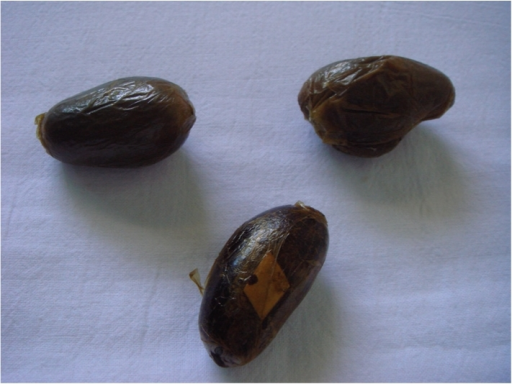
5 cm hashish packages taken from a smuggler by police

Costa declined to identify countries or banks that may have received any drug money, saying that would be inappropriate because his office is supposed to address the problem, not apportion blame.

Though street-level drug sales are widely viewed as lucrative, a study by Sudhir Venkatesh suggested that many low-level employees receive low wages. In a study he made in the 1990s working closely with members of the Black Gangster Disciple Nation in Chicago, he found that one gang (essentially a franchise) consisted of a leader (a college graduate named J.T.), three senior officers, and 25 to 75 street level salesmen ('foot soldiers') depending on season. Selling crack cocaine, they took in approximately $32,000 per month over a six-year period. This was spent as follows: $5,000 to the board of twenty directors of the Black Gangster Disciple Nation, who oversaw 100 such gangs for approximately $500,000 in monthly income. Another $5,000 monthly was paid for cocaine, and $4,000 for other non-wage expenses. J.T. took $8,500 monthly for his own salary. The remaining $9,500 monthly went to pay the employees a $7 per hour wage for officers and a $3.30 per hour wage for foot soldiers. Contrary to a popular image of drug sales as a lucrative profession, many of the employees were living with their mothers by necessity. Despite this, the gang had four times as many unpaid members who dreamed of becoming foot soldiers.

== Impact of free trade ==
There are several arguments on whether or not free trade correlates with increased activity in the illicit drug trade. Currently, the structure and operation of the illicit drug industry is described mainly in terms of an international division of labor. Free trade can open new markets to domestic producers who would otherwise resort to exporting illicit drugs. Additionally, extensive free trade among states increases cross-border drug enforcement and coordination between law enforcement agencies in different countries. However, free trade also increases the sheer volume of legal cross-border trade and provides cover for drug smuggling—by providing ample opportunity to conceal illicit cargo in legal trade. While international free trade continues to expand the volume of legal trade, the ability to detect and interdict drug trafficking is severely diminished. Towards the late 1990s, the top ten seaports in the world processed 33.6 million containers. Free trade has fostered integration of financial markets and has provided drug traffickers with more opportunities to launder money and invest in other activities. This strengthens the drug industry while weakening the efforts of law enforcement to monitor the flow of drug money into the legitimate economy. Cooperation among cartels expands their scope to distant markets and strengthens their abilities to evade detection by local law enforcement. Additionally, criminal organizations work together to coordinate money-laundering activities by having separate organizations handle specific stages of laundering process. One organization structures the process of how financial transactions will be laundered, while another criminal group provides the "dirty" money to be cleaned. By fostering expansion of trade and global transportation networks, free trade encourages cooperation and formation of alliances among criminal organizations across different countries. The drug trade in Latin America emerged in the early 1930s. It saw significant growth in the Andean countries, including Peru, Bolivia, Chile, Ecuador, Colombia and Venezuela. The underground market in the early half of the 20th century mainly had ties to Europe. After World War II, the Andean countries saw an expansion of trade, specifically with cocaine.

== Drug trafficking by country ==
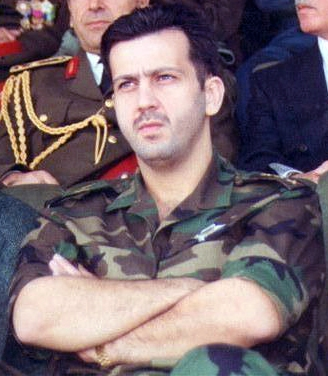
Maher al-Assad, younger brother of Bashar al-Assad and commander of the Syrian Republican Guards, oversaw the operations of Ba'athist Syria's drug trade.

=== Syria ===
The Ba'athist government of Syria ruled by the Al-Assad family was known for its extensive involvement in drug trade since the 1970s. As of 2022, the Syrian government financed the biggest multi-billion dollar drug trade in the world, mostly focused on an illegal drug known as Captagon, making it the world's largest narco-state. Its revenues from Captagon smuggling alone were estimated at $57 billion annually in 2022, which is approximately thrice the total trade of all Mexican cartels. General Maher al-Assad, younger brother of Syrian dictator Bashar al-Assad and commander of the Fourth Armoured Division, directly supervised the production, smuggling and profiteering of the drug business. Already suffering from severe financial problems as a result of corruption and civil war, profits from Captagon were said to be the "lifeline" of the Assad regime, through which it earned more than 90% of its total revenue. The smugglers receive direct training from the Syrian military to successfully conduct trafficking operations.

Republican Guard, commanded by Maher al-Assad was one of the main Ba'athist military divisions that was engaged in perpetrating brutal crackdowns and mass violence against protestors across the country. In 2018, Bashar al-Assad assigned Maher as the commander of the 4th Armoured Division, a military unit that supervised the Assad regime's criminal enterprises like smuggling, drug trafficking, narcotics production and plunder of goods and resources. Under Maher's supervision, the 4th Armoured Division expanded captagon production and trafficking from Syria into a "business model controlled by the regime".

In 2022, 90% of all Captagon pills manufactured in Syria exported by drug cartels affiliated with Assad regime arrived at its customer destinations across the world. Although hundreds of millions of pills were intercepted and seized by police forces, these accounted only for 10% of the total Captagon exports of the drug cartels linked to the Assad regime. In 2020, Italian police seized 84 million captagon pills originating from Syrian ports while intercepting a single shipment. In June 2023, US State Department's Bureau of Near Eastern Affairs published a detailed report to the US Congress, elucidating a strategy to eliminate the narcotics production, drug trafficking and drug cartel networks affiliated with the Assad regime and Hezbollah.

A joint investigation conducted by Organized Crime and Corruption Reporting Project (OCCRP) and BBC News Arabic published a documentary in June 2023, revealing further details about the activities of regime officials, Ba'athist military commanders and Assad family members in their involvement in Syria's drug cartel. The investigation found that Lebanese criminal and drug kingpin Hassan Daqou collaborated with Syria's Fourth Armoured Division on trafficiking billions of dollars of drugs, under the command of General Ghassan Bilal, the right-hand man of Maher al-Assad. The report also unearthed Hezbollah's close participation in the drug production and smuggling networks. The Fourth Armoured Division, being an elite military unit permitted to move freely across Assad regime's checkpoints, oversees the smuggling operations from Syria, including the trafficking of cash, weapons, illegal drugs, etc. Days after the publication of the joint BBC-OCCRP documentary; Assad government banned all activities of BBC media outlets and entry of affiliated media personnel in Syria.

The extensive involvement of Syrian Armed Forces in sponsorship of drug production and trade has led to pervasive drug addiction problems amongst pro-Assad soldiers. In many instances, military officials encourage the soldiers to consume Captagon and other illegal drugs, leading to overdose or drug abuse. Pro-Assad fighters in the National Defence Forces and Hezbollah also consume illegal drugs in large quantities. In July 2023, German police busted a major captagon network run by two Syrian-born men in southern German state of Bavaria. Assad regime sponsors the largest Captagon production network in Syria; which is the source of about 80% of total captagon supply in the world.

In an investigative report published by The Insider news-outlet in 2024, journalist Yuriy Matsarsky stated:

"...Captagon produced in underground labs—and in actual Syrian pharmaceutical facilities—is distributed to the fighters of Bashar Assad's army. Interestingly, however, the quantities the country produces far exceed its own military's demand. ... By some estimates, this business gives Syria more money than its entire legal export, and the regime constantly works to increase its profits, primarily by expanding its market reach. To this end, criminal gangs associated with Damascus or Hezbollah have built distribution networks for Captagon in countries where the drug was not previously popular."

=== United States ===
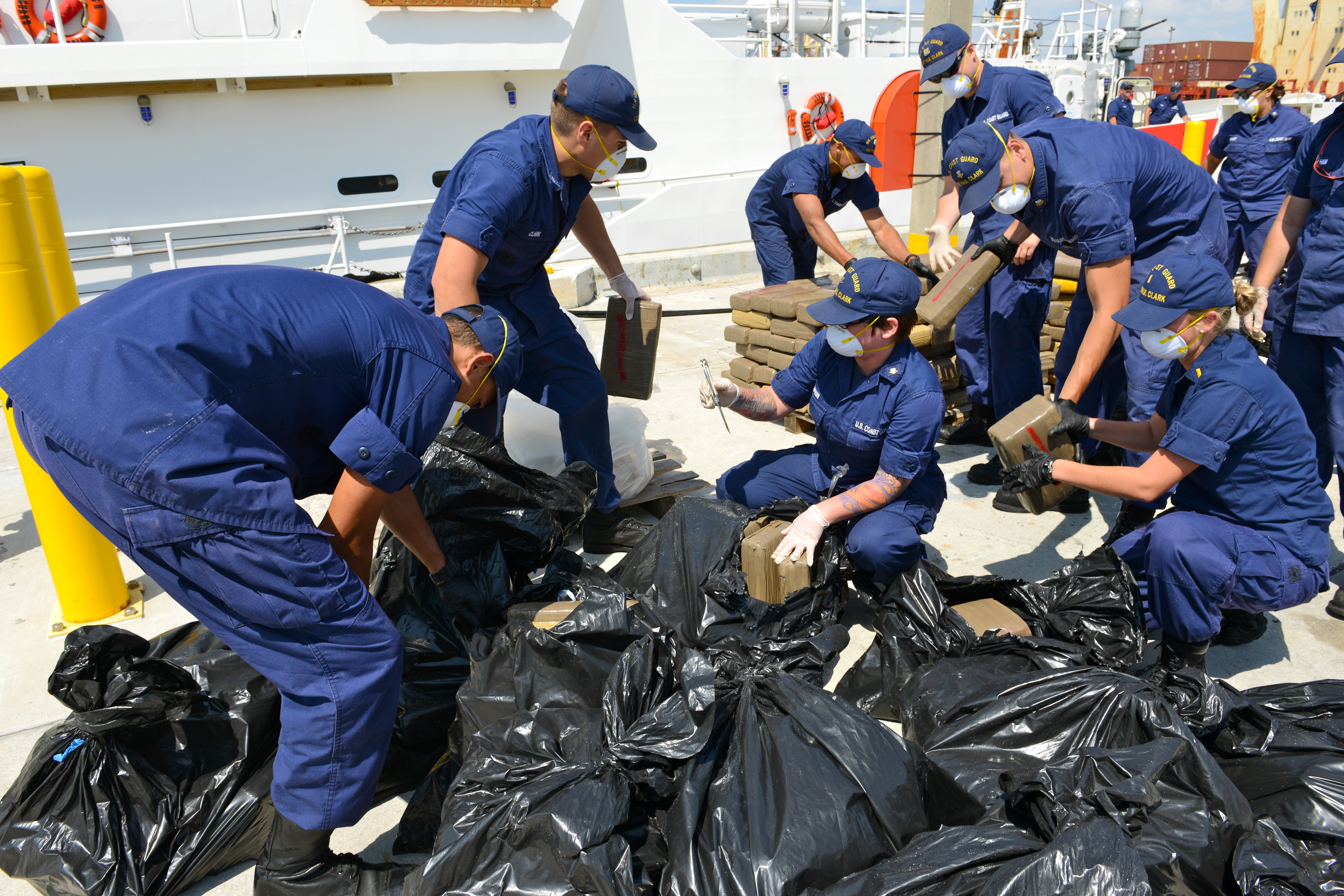
The US Coast Guard offloads seized cocaine in Miami Beach, Florida, May 2014.

==== Background ====
The effects of the illegal drug trade in the United States can be seen in a range of political, economic and social aspects. Increasing drug related violence can be tied to the racial tension that arose during the late 20th century along with the political upheaval prevalent throughout the 1960s and 70s. The second half of the 20th century was a period when increased wealth, and increased discretionary spending, increased the demand for illicit drugs in certain areas of the United States. Large-scale drug trafficking is one of the capital crimes, and may result in a death sentence prescribed at the federal level when it involves murder.

==== Political impact ====
A large generation, the baby boomers, came of age in the 1960s. Their social tendency to confront the law on specific issues, including illegal drugs, overwhelmed the understaffed judicial system. The federal government attempted to enforce the law, but with meager effect.

Marijuana was a popular drug seen through the Latin American trade route in the 1960s. Cocaine became a major drug product in the later decades. Much of the cocaine is smuggled from Colombia and Mexico via Jamaica. This led to several administrations combating the popularity of these drugs. Due to the influence of this development on the US economy, the Reagan administration began "certifying" countries for their attempts at controlling drug trafficking. This allowed the United States to intervene in activities related to illegal drug transport in Latin America. Continuing into the 1980s, the United States instated stricter policy pertaining to drug transit through sea. As a result, there was an influx in drug-trafficking across the Mexico–US border, which increased the drug cartel activity in Mexico.

By the early 1990s, as much as 50% of the cocaine available in the United States market originated from Mexico, and by the 2000s, over 90% of the cocaine in the United States was imported from Mexico. In Colombia, however, there was a fall of the major drug cartels in the mid-1990s. Visible shifts occurred in the drug market in the United States. Between 1996 and 2000, US cocaine consumption dropped by 11%.

In 2008, the US government initiated another program, known as the Merida Initiative, to help combat drug trafficking in Mexico. This program increased US security assistance to $1.4 billion over several years, which helped supply Mexican forces with "high-end equipment from helicopters to surveillance technology". Despite US aid, Mexican "narcogangs" continue to outnumber and outgun the Mexican Army, allowing for continued activities of drug cartels across the US–Mexico border.

==== Social impacts ====
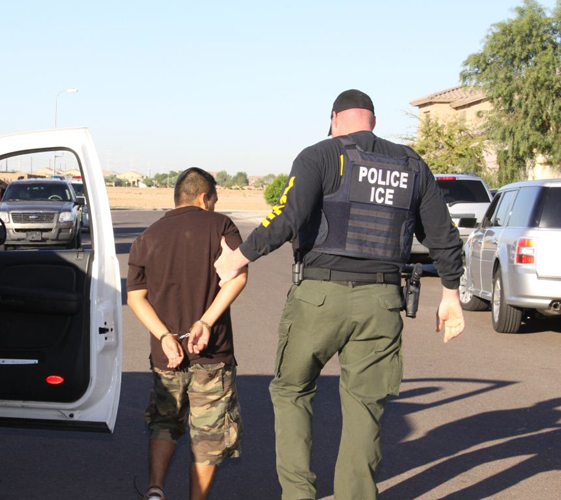
ICE arresting an individual in Arizona, October 2011

Although narcotics are illegal in the US, they have become integrated into the nation's culture and are seen as a recreational activity by sections of the population. Illicit drugs are considered to be a commodity with strong demand, as they are typically sold at a high value. This high price is caused by a combination of factors that include the potential legal ramifications that exist for suppliers of illicit drugs and their high demand. Despite the constant effort by politicians to win the war on drugs, the US is still the world's largest importer of illegal drugs.

Throughout the 20th century, narcotics other than cocaine also crossed the Mexican border, meeting the US demand for alcohol during the 1920s Prohibition, opiates in the 1940s, marijuana in the 1960s, and heroin in the 1970s. Most of the US imports of drugs come from Mexican drug cartels. In the United States, around 195 cities have been infiltrated by drug trafficking that originated in Mexico. An estimated $10bn of the Mexican drug cartel's profits come from the United States, not only supplying the Mexican drug cartels with the profit necessary for survival, but also furthering America's economic dependence on drugs.

==== Demographics ====
With a large wave of immigrants in the 1960s and onwards, the United States saw an increasingly heterogeneous public. In the 1980s and 1990s, drug-related homicide was at a record high. This increase in drug violence became increasingly tied to these ethnic minorities. Though the rate of violence varied tremendously among cities in America, it was a common anxiety in communities across urban America. An example of this could be seen in Miami, a city with a host of ethnic enclaves. Between 1985 and 1995, the homicide rate in Miami was one of the highest in the nation—four times the national homicide average. This crime rate was correlated with regions with low employment and was not entirely dependent on ethnicity.

The baby boomer generation also felt the effects of the drug trade in their increased drug use from the 1960s to 1980s. Along with substance use, criminal involvement, suicide and murder were also on the rise. Due to the large amount of baby boomers, commercial marijuana use was on the rise. This increased the supply and demand for marijuana during this time period.

=== Mexico ===
==== Political influences ====
Corruption in Mexico has contributed to the domination of Mexican cartels in the illicit drug trade. Since the beginning of the 20th century, Mexico's political environment allowed the growth of drug-related activity. The loose regulation over the transportation of illegal drugs and the failure to prosecute known drug traffickers and gangs increased the growth of the drug industry. Toleration of drug trafficking has undermined the authority of the Mexican government and has decreased the power of law enforcement officers in regulation over such activities. These policies of tolerance fostered the growing power of drug cartels in the Mexican economy and have made drug traders wealthier. Many states in Mexico lack policies that establish stability in governance. There also is a lack of local stability, as mayors cannot be re-elected. This requires electing a new mayor each term. Drug gangs have manipulated this, using vacuums in local leadership to their own advantage.

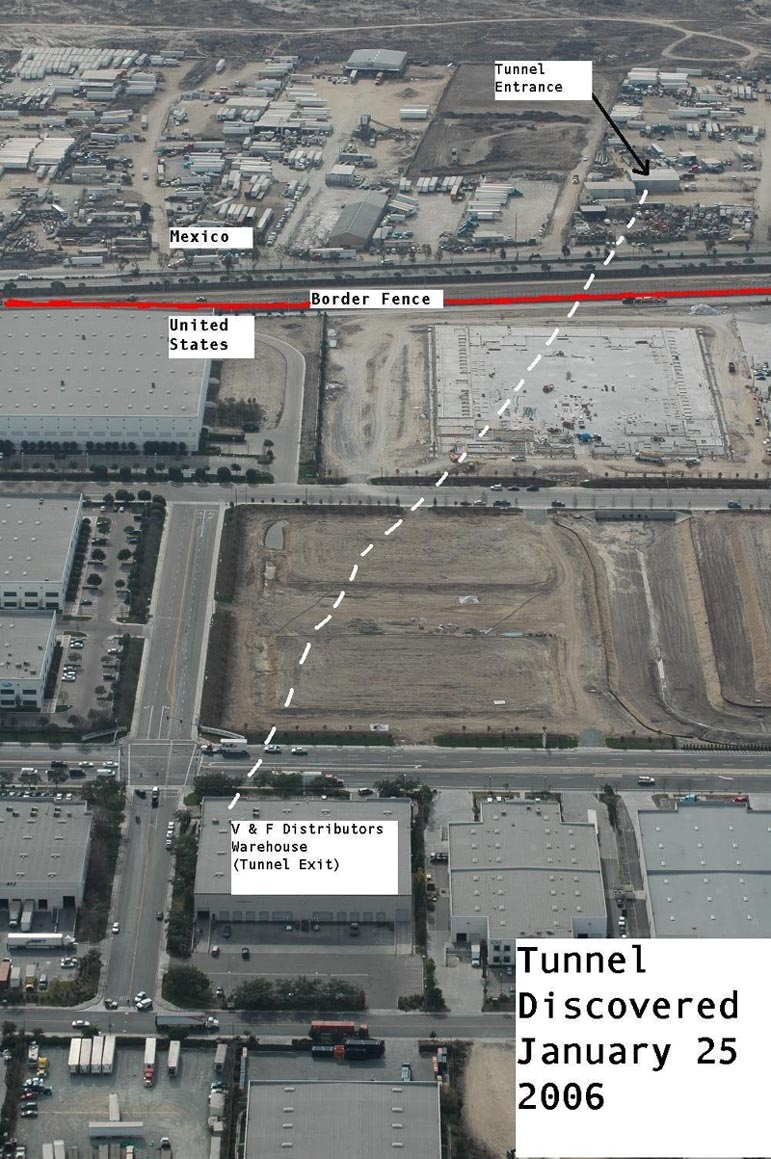
Drug trafficking tunnel discovered near US-Mexico border in San Diego–Tijuana metropolitan area

In 1929, the Institutional Revolutionary Party (PRI) was formed to resolve the chaos resulting from the Mexican Revolution. Over time, this party gained political influence and had a major impact on Mexico's social and economic policies. The party created ties with various groups as a power play in order to gain influence, and as a result created more corruption in the government. One such power play was an alliance with drug traffickers. This political corruption obscured justice, making it difficult to identify violence when it related to drugs. By the 1940s, the tie between the drug cartels and the PRI had solidified. This arrangement created immunity for the leaders of the drug cartels and allowed drug trafficking to grow under the protection of the government officials.

During the 1990s, the PRI lost some elections to the new National Action Party (PAN). Chaos again emerged as elected government in Mexico changed drastically. As the PAN party took control, drug cartel leaders took advantage of the ensuing confusion and used their existing influence to further gain power. Instead of negotiating with the central government as was done with the PRI party, drug cartels utilized new ways to distribute their supply and continued operating through force and intimidation. As Mexico became more democratized, the corruption fell from a centralized power to the local authorities. Cartels began to bribe local authorities, thus eliminating the structure and rules placed by the government—giving cartels more freedom. As a response, Mexico saw an increase in violence caused by drug trafficking.

The corruption cartels created resulted in distrust of government by the Mexican public. This distrust became more prominent after the collapse of the PRI party. In response, the presidents of Mexico, in the late twentieth century and early twenty-first century, implemented several different programs relating to law enforcement and regulation. In 1993, President Salinas created the National Institute for the Combat of Drugs in Mexico. From 1995 to 1998, President Zedillo established policies regarding increased punishment of organized crime, allowing "[wire taps], protected witnesses, covert agents and seizures of goods", and increasing the quality of law enforcement at the federal level. From 2001 to 2005, President Vicente Fox created the Federal Agency of Investigation. These policies resulted in the arrests of major drug-trafficking bosses:

Arrested drug traffickers
Year	Person	Cartel
1989	Miguel Angel Felix Gallardo	Guadalajara Cartel
1993	Joaquín Archivaldo Guzmán Loera	Sinaloa Cartel
1995	Héctor Luis Palma Salazar	Sinaloa Cartel
1996	Juan Garcia Abrego	Gulf Cartel
2002	Ismael Higuera Guerrero	Tijuana Cartel
2002	Jesus Labra	Tijuana Cartel
2002	Adan Amezcua	Colima Cartel
2002	Benjamin Arellano Felix	Tijuana Cartel
2003	Osiel Cardenas	Gulf Cartel

==== Mexico's economy ====
Over the past few decades, drug cartels have become integrated into Mexico's economy. Approximately 500 cities are directly engaged in drug trafficking and nearly 450,000 people are employed by drug cartels. Additionally, the livelihood of 3.2 million people is dependent on the drug cartels. Between local and international sales, such as to Europe and the United States, drug cartels in Mexico see a $25–30 bn yearly profit, a great deal of which circulates through international banks such as HSBC. Drug cartels are fundamental in local economics. A percentage of the profits seen from the trade are invested in the local community. Such profits contribute to the education and healthcare of the community. While these cartels bring violence and hazards into communities, they create jobs and provide income for its many members.

==== Culture of drug cartels ====
Major cartels saw growth due to a prominent set culture of Mexican society that created the means for drug capital. One of the sites of origin for drug trafficking within Mexico, was the state of Michoacán. In the past, Michoacán was mainly an agricultural society. This provided an initial growth of trade. Industrialization of rural areas of Mexico facilitated a greater distribution of drugs, expanding the drug market into different provinces. Once towns became industrialized, cartels such as the Sinaloa Cartel started to form and expand. The proliferation of drug cartel culture largely stemmed from the ranchero culture seen in Michoacán. Ranchero culture values the individual as opposed to the society as a whole. This culture fostered the drug culture of valuing the family that is formed within the cartel. This ideal allowed for greater organization within the cartels.

Gangs play a major role in the activity of drug cartels. MS-13 and the 18th Street gang are notorious for their contributions and influence over drug trafficking throughout Latin America. MS-13 has controlled much of the activity in the drug trade spanning from Mexico to Panama. Female involvement is present in the Mexican drug culture. Although females are not treated as equals to males, they typically hold more power than their culture allows and acquire some independence. The increase in power has attracted females from higher social classes. Financial gain has also prompted women to become involved in the illegal drug market. Many women in the lower levels of major drug cartels belong to a low economic class. Drug trafficking offers women an accessible way to earn income. Females from all social classes have become involved in the trade due to outside pressure from their social and economic environments.

=== Colombia ===
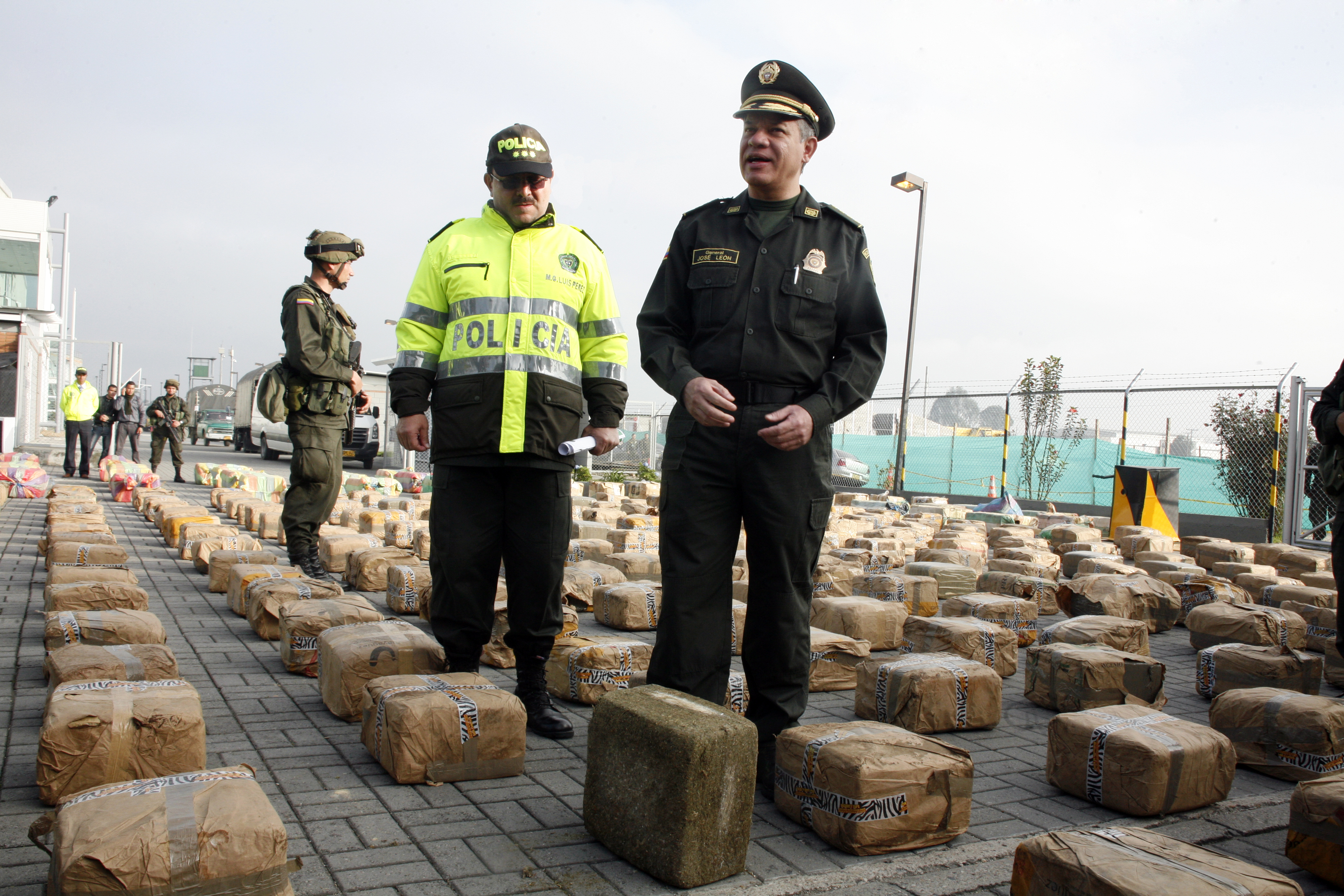
Seized drugs in Bogotá, Colombia, April 2013

==== Political ties ====
It was common for smugglers in Colombia to import liquor, alcohol, cigarettes and textiles, while exporting cocaine. Personnel with knowledge of the terrain were able to supply the local market while also exporting a large amount of product. The established trade initially involved Peru, Bolivia, Colombia, Venezuela and Cuba. Peasant farmers produced coca paste in Peru and Bolivia, while Colombian smugglers would process the coca paste into cocaine in Colombia, and trafficked product through Batista's Cuba. This trade route established ties between Cuban and Colombian organized crime.

From Cuba, cocaine would be transported to Miami, Florida; and Union City, New Jersey. Quantities of the drug were then smuggled throughout the US. The international drug trade created political ties between the involved countries, encouraging the governments of the countries involved to collaborate and instate common policies to eradicate drug cartels. Cuba stopped being a center for transport of cocaine following the Cuban Revolution and the establishment of Fidel Castro's communist government in 1959.

As a result, Miami and Union City became the sole locations for trafficking. The relations between Cuban and Colombian organized crime remained strong until the 1970s, when Colombian cartels began to vie for power. In the 1980s and 90s, Colombia emerged as a key contributor of the drug trade industry in the Western Hemisphere. While the smuggling of drugs such as marijuana, poppy, opium and heroin became more ubiquitous during this time period, the activity of cocaine cartels drove the development of the Latin American drug trade. The trade emerged as a multinational effort as supplies (i.e. coca plant substances) were imported from countries such as Bolivia and Peru, were refined in Colombian cocaine labs and smuggled through Colombia, and exported to countries such as the US.

==== Colombia's economy ====
Colombia has had a significant role in the illegal drug trade in Latin America. While it was active in the drug trade since the 1930s, Colombia's role in the drug trade did not truly become dominant until the 1970s. When Mexico eradicated marijuana plantations, demand stayed the same. Colombia met much of the demand by growing more marijuana. Grown in the strategic northeast region of Colombia, marijuana soon became the country's leading cash crop. This success was short-lived due to anti-marijuana campaigns that were enforced by the US military throughout the Caribbean. Instead, drug traffickers in Colombia continued their focus on exporting cocaine.

Having been an export of Colombia since the early 1950s, cocaine remained popular for a host of reasons. Colombia's location facilitated its transportation from South America into Central America, and then to its destination of North America. This continued into the 1990s, when Colombia remained the chief exporter of cocaine. The business of drug trafficking can be seen in several stages in Colombia towards the latter half of the 20th century. Colombia served as the dominant force in the distribution and sale of cocaine by the 1980s. As drug producers gained more power, they became more centralized and organized into what became drug cartels.

Cartels controlled the major aspects of each stage in the traffic of their product. Their organization allowed cocaine to be distributed in great amounts throughout the United States. By the late 1980s, intra-industry strife arose within the cartels. This stage was marked by increased violence as different cartels fought for control of export markets. Despite this strife, this power struggle led to then having multiple producers of coca leaf farms. This in turn caused an improvement in quality control and reduction of police interdiction in the distribution of cocaine. This also led to cartels attempting to repatriate their earnings which would eventually make up 5.5% of Colombia's GDP. This drive to repatriate earnings led to the pressure of legitimizing their wealth, causing an increase in violence throughout Colombia.

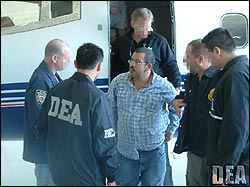
Colombian drug lord Diego Murillo Bejarano was extradited from Colombia to the US in May 2008.

Throughout the 1980s, estimates of illegal drug value in Colombia ranged from $2bn to $4bn. This made up about 7–10% of the $36bn estimated Gross National Product (GNP) of Colombia during this decade. In the 1990s, the estimates of the illegal drug value remained roughly within the same range (~$2.5bn). As the Colombian GNP rose throughout the 1990s ($68.5bn in 1994 and $96.3bn in 1997), illegal drug values began to comprise a decreasing fraction of the national economy. By the early 1990s, although Colombia led in the exportation of cocaine, it found increasing confrontations within its state. These confrontations were primarily between cartels and government institutions. This led to a decrease in the drug trade's contribution to the GDP of Colombia; dropping from 5.5% to 2.6%. Though a contributor of wealth, the distribution of cocaine has had negative effects on the socio-political situation of Colombia and has weakened its economy as well.

==== Social impacts ====
By the 1980s, Colombian cartels became the dominant cocaine distributors in the US. This led to the spread of increased violence throughout both Latin America and Miami. In the 1980s, two major drug cartels emerged in Colombia: the Medellín and Cali groups.

Throughout the 1990s however, several factors led to the decline of these major cartels and to the rise of smaller Colombian cartels. The US demand for cocaine dropped while Colombian production rose, pressuring traffickers to find new drugs and markets. In this time period, there was an increase in activity of Caribbean cartels that led to the rise of an alternate route of smuggling through Mexico. This led to the increased collaboration between major Colombian and Mexican drug traffickers. Such drastic changes in the execution of drug trade in Colombia paired with the political instabilities and rise of drug wars in Medellin and Cali, gave way for the rise of the smaller Colombian drug trafficking organizations (and the rise of heroin trade). As the drug trade's influence over the economy increased, drug lords and their networks grew in their power and influence in society. The occurrences in drug-related violence increased during this time period as drug lords fought to maintain their control in the economy.

Typically, a drug cartel had support networks that consisted of a number of individuals. These people ranged from those directly involved in the trade (such as suppliers, chemists, transporters, smugglers, etc.) as well as those involved indirectly in the trade (such as politicians, bankers, police, etc.). As these smaller Colombian drug cartels grew in prevalence, several notable aspects of the Colombian society gave way for further development of the Colombian drug industry. For example, until the late 1980s, the long-term effects of the drug industry were not realized by much of society. Additionally, there was a lack of regulation in prisons where captured traffickers were sent. These prisons were under-regulated, under-funded, and under-staffed, which allowed for the formation of prison gangs, for the smuggling of arms/weapons/etc., for feasible escapes, and even for captured drug lords to continue running their businesses from prison.

=== Western Balkans ===
Since the beginning of the 21st century, the global drug trade network has witnessed the emergence of criminal groups from the Western Balkans as crucial players. These groups have moved up from being small-time crooks to major drug distributors. Most of these organized crime groups originated in Albania, Bosnia and Herzegovina, Kosovo, Montenegro, North Macedonia and Serbia. The illicit trade activities of the Balkans primarily involved Latin America, Western Europe, South Africa, Australia and Turkey. These groups keep their operations outside the Western Balkans, while staying connected to their homeland. Within the network of these groups, the dealmakers operate near supply sources and the distribution networks are managed by foot soldiers. However, the bosses of the organized criminal groups stay and keep their wealth in the United Arab Emirates (UAE). The UAE is amongst the enablers of global corruption and illicit financial flows. Analysts have claimed that criminal actors across the world either operate from or through the UAE. It was a haven for criminals, where the risk from conducting illicit activities remains low.

For the Balkan criminals, a growing trend was to relocate to the UAE, which became attractive to "dirty money" and kingpins from several European nations and the United Kingdom. Besides, Dubai was also dubbed as the "new Costa del Crime", replacing the crime hideaway of Spain, the Costa del Sol. The UAE had poor regulations for money laundering and for screening of suspicious transactions. The lack of regulations against illicit financial activities prompted the Financial Action Task Force (FATF) to place the Gulf country on its grey list in March 2022. Consequently, the UAE remained a safe option for the criminals. Nearly two-thirds of the Albanian criminal groups, who were active in trade of drugs like cocaine, were believed to be hiding in the UAE. One such individual, Eldi Dizdari was accused of international drug trafficking and was living in Dubai. Research revealed that these criminals invested huge amounts in UAE real estate and other economic sectors to live there. Another trafficker of cocaine from Bosnia, Edin Gačanin, was living in the UAE using his extensive profits to buy property and protection in the country. Dubbed as the "European Escobar", he connected the supply network between production markets of Latin America and consumer markets of Western Europe. He was able to evade the arrest and investigations, including by the US Drug Enforcement Administration, by seeking shelter in the UAE.

== Trade in specific drugs ==
=== Cannabis ===
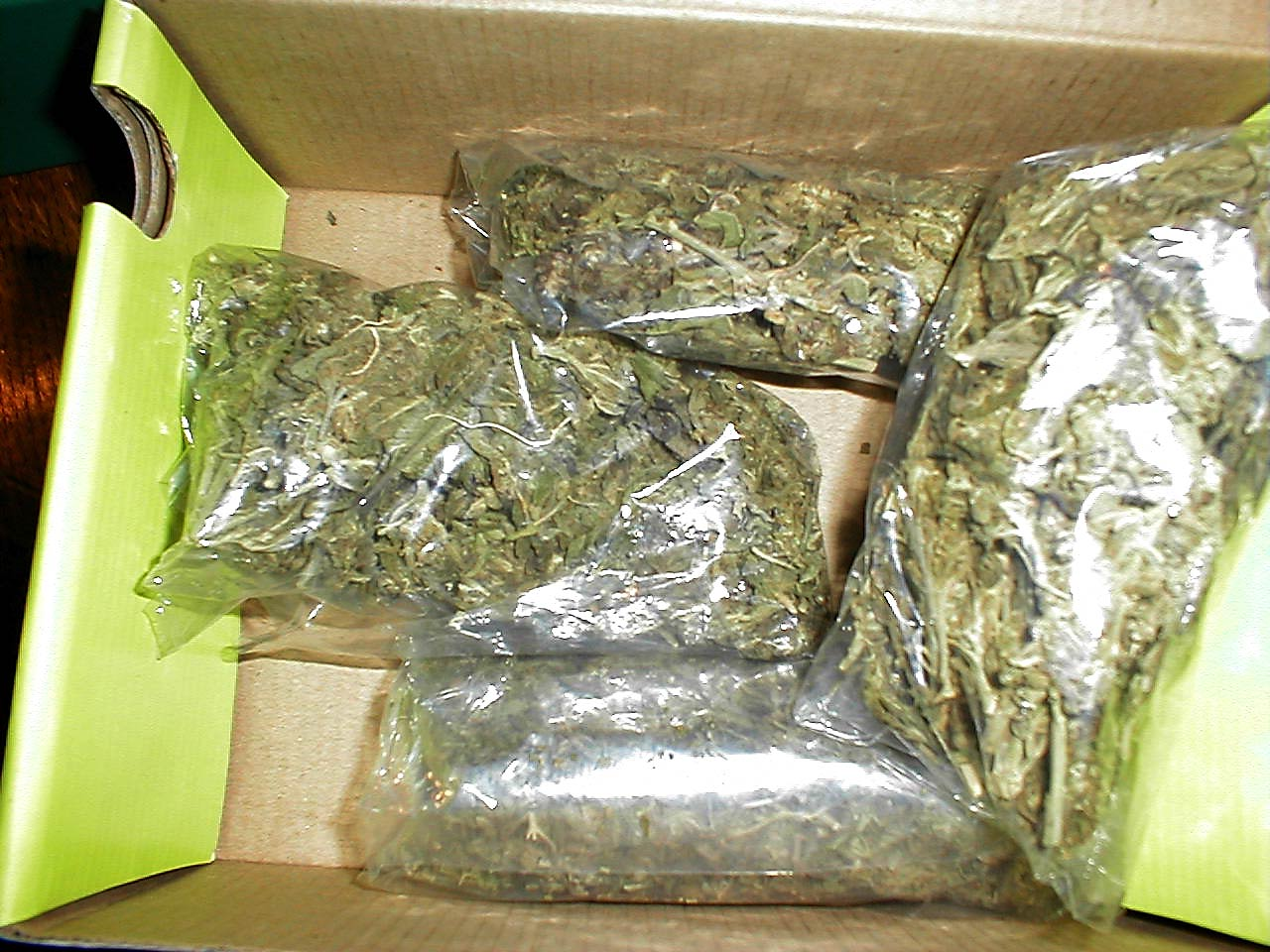
Four ounces (110 g) of cannabis

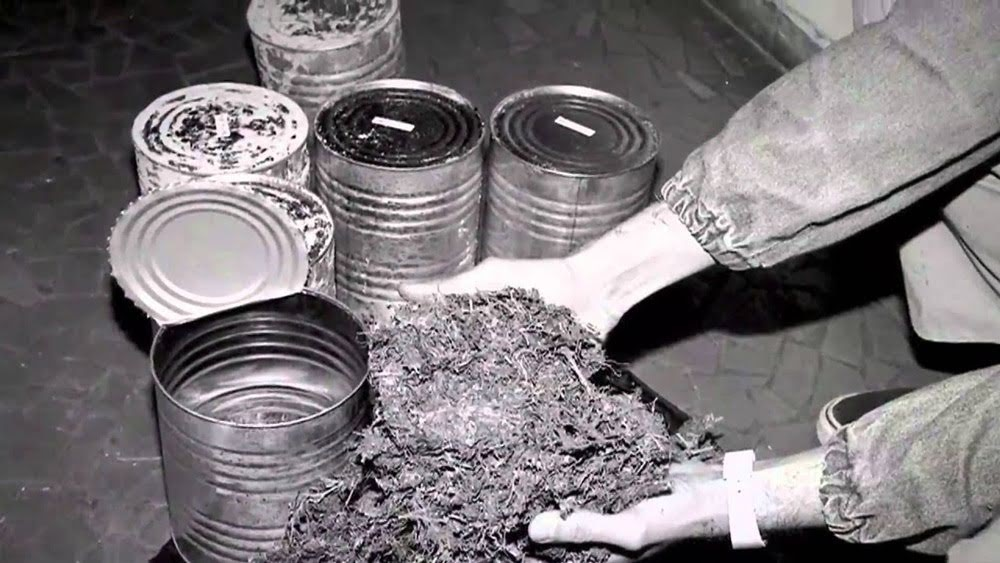
Trafficked cannabis in Brazil. Each can contained 1.5 kilograms (3.3 lb).

While the recreational use of (and consequently the distribution of) cannabis is illegal in majority of countries, recreational distribution is legal in some countries, such as Canada, and medical distribution is permitted in some places, such as 38 of the 50 US states (although importation and distribution is still federally prohibited). Beginning in 2014, Uruguay became the first country to legalize cultivation, sale, and consumption of cannabis for recreational use for adult residents. In 2018, Canada became the second country to legalize use, sale and cultivation of cannabis. The first few weeks were met with extremely high demand, most shops being out of stock after operating for only four days.

Cannabis use is tolerated in some areas, most notably the Netherlands, which has legalized the possession and licensed sale (but not cultivation) of the drug. Many nations have decriminalized the possession of small amounts of marijuana. Due to the hardy nature of the cannabis plant, marijuana is grown all across the world; today, it is the world's most popular illegal drug with the highest level of availability. Cannabis is grown legally in many countries for industrial, non-drug use (known as hemp) as well. Cannabis-hemp may also be planted for other non-drug domestic purposes, such as seasoning that occurs in Aceh.

The demand for cannabis around the world, coupled with the drug's relative ease of cultivation, makes the illicit cannabis trade one of the primary ways in which organized criminal groups finance many of their activities. In Mexico, for example, the illicit trafficking of cannabis is thought to constitute the majority of many of the cartels' earnings, and the main way in which the cartels finance many other illegal activities; including the purchase of other illegal drugs for trafficking, and for acquiring weapons that are ultimately used to commit murders (causing a burgeoning in the homicide rates of many areas of the world, but particularly Latin America).

Some studies show that the increased legalization of cannabis in the United States (beginning in 2012 with Washington Initiative 502 and Colorado Amendment 64) has led Mexican cartels to smuggle less cannabis in exchange for more heroin.

=== Alcohol ===
Alcohol, in the context of alcoholic beverages rather than denatured alcohol, is illegal in a number of Muslim countries, such as Saudi Arabia; this has resulted in a thriving illegal trade in alcohol. The manufacture, sale, transportation, import, and export of alcoholic beverages were illegal in the United States during the time known as the Prohibition in the 1920s and early 1930s.

=== Heroin ===
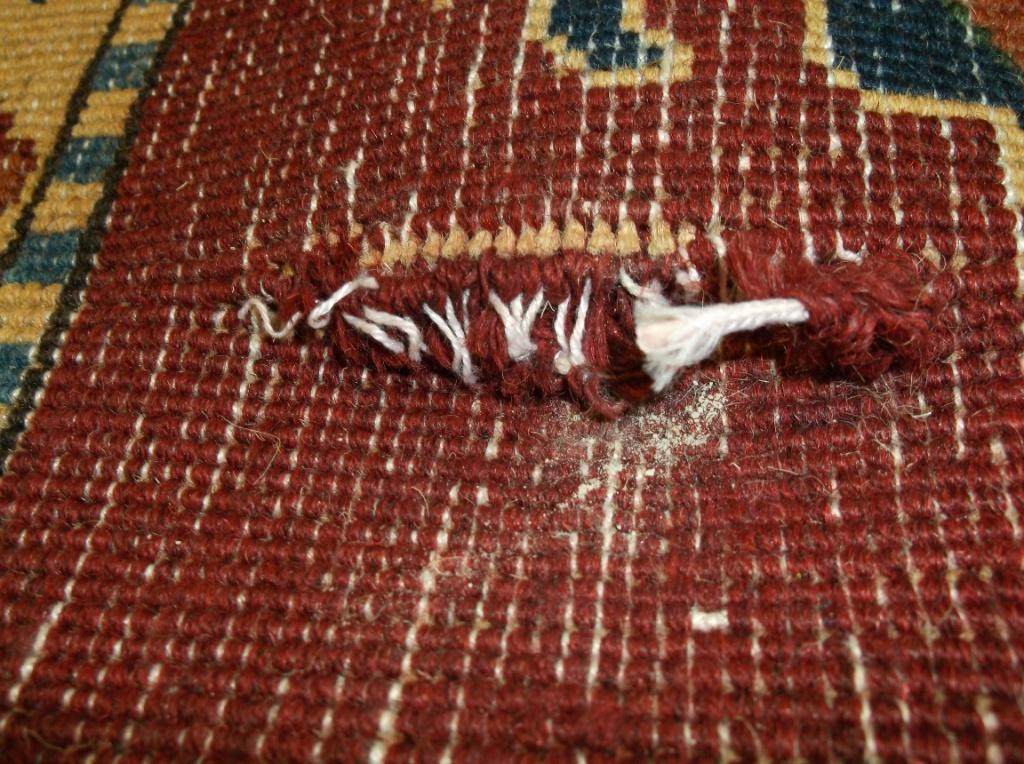
Heroin woven into a hand-made knotted carpet seized at Manchester Airport, 2012

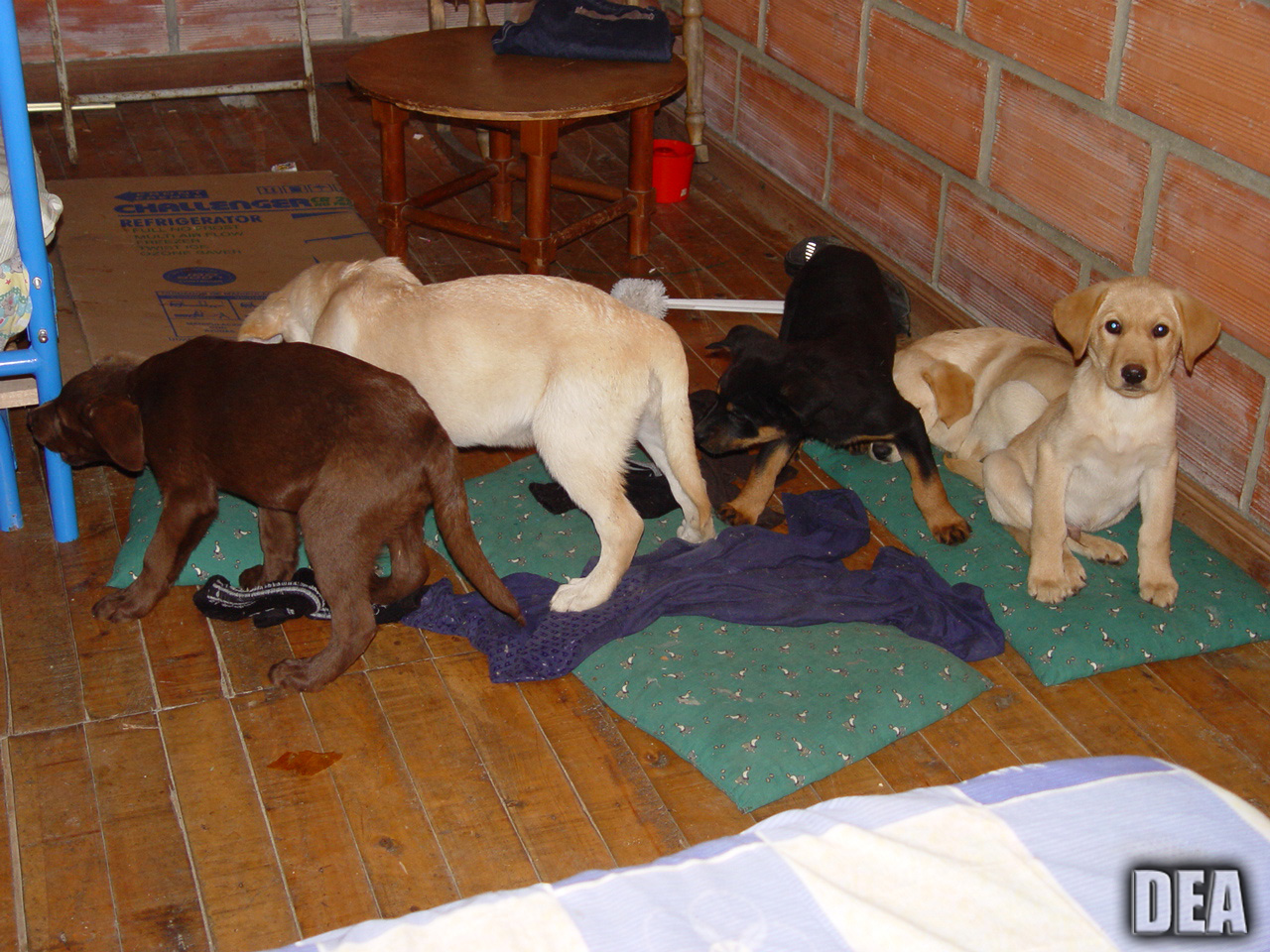
The puppies pictured had packets of liquid heroin surgically implanted in them by a veterinarian drug smuggler.

In the 1950s and 1960s, most heroin was produced in Turkey and transshipped in France via the French Connection crime ring, with much of it arriving in the United States. This resulted in the record setting 26 April 1968 seizure of 246 lb (111.6 kg) of heroin smuggled in a vehicle on the SS France (1960) ocean liner. By the time of The French Connection (1971 film), this route was being supplanted.

Then, until c. 2004, the majority of the world's heroin was produced in an area known as the Golden Triangle. However, by 2007, 93% of the opiates on the world market originated in Afghanistan. This amounted to an export value of about US$4 billion, with a quarter being earned by opium farmers and the rest going to district officials, insurgents, warlords and drug traffickers. Another significant area where poppy fields are grown for the manufacture of heroin is Mexico. In November 2023, a U.N report showed that in the entirety of Afghanistan, poppy cultivation dropped by over 95%, removing it from its place as being the world's largest opium producer.

According to the United States Drug Enforcement Administration, the price of heroin is typically valued 8 to 10 times that of cocaine on American streets, making it a high-profit substance for smugglers and dealers. In Europe (except the transit countries Portugal and the Netherlands), for example, a purported gram of street heroin, usually consisting of 700–800 mg of a light to dark brown powder containing 5–10% heroin base, costs €30–70, making the effective value per gram of pure heroin €300–700. Heroin is generally a preferred product for smuggling and distribution—over unrefined opium due to the cost-effectiveness and increased efficacy of heroin.

Because of the high cost per volume, heroin is easily smuggled. A US quarter-sized (2.5 cm) cylindrical vial can contain hundreds of doses. From the 1930s to the early 1970s, the so-called French Connection supplied the majority of US demand. Allegedly, during the Vietnam War, drug lords such as Ike Atkinson used to smuggle hundreds of kilograms of heroin to the US in coffins of dead American soldiers (see Cadaver Connection). Since that time it has become more difficult for drugs to be imported into the US than it had been in previous decades, but that does not stop the heroin smugglers from getting their product across US borders. Purity levels vary greatly by region with Northeastern cities having the most pure heroin in the United States. On 17 October 2018 police in Genoa, Italy discovered 270 kg (600 lb) of heroin hidden in a ship coming from the Iranian southern port of Bandar Abbas. The ship had already passed and stopped at Hamburg in Germany and Valencia in Spain.

Penalties for smuggling heroin or morphine are often harsh in most countries. Some countries will readily hand down a death sentence (e.g. Singapore) or life in prison for the illegal smuggling of heroin or morphine, which are both internationally Schedule I drugs under the Single Convention on Narcotic Drugs.

In May 2021, Romania seized 1.4 tonnes of heroin at Constanța port of a shipment from Iran that was headed for Western Europe.

=== Methamphetamine ===
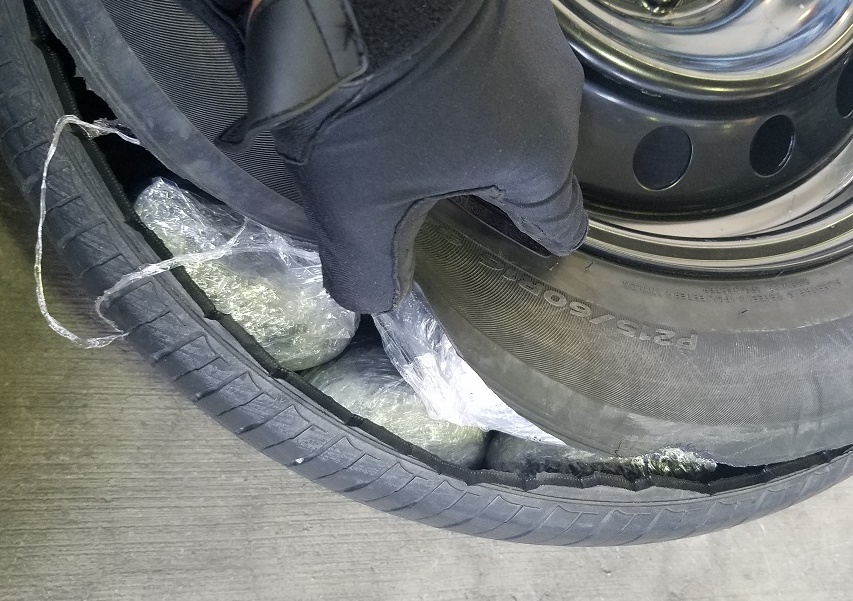
Methamphetamine smuggled inside a car tire

Methamphetamine is another popular drug among distributors. Three common street names are "meth", "crank", and "ice".

According to the Community Epidemiology Work Group, the number of clandestine methamphetamine laboratory incidents reported to the National Clandestine Laboratory Database decreased from 1999 to 2009. During this period, methamphetamine lab incidents increased in mid-western States (Illinois, Michigan, Missouri, and Ohio), and in Pennsylvania. In 2004, more lab incidents were reported in Missouri (2,788) and Illinois (1,058) than in California (764). In 2003, methamphetamine lab incidents reached new highs in Georgia (250), Minnesota (309), and Texas (677). There were only seven methamphetamine lab incidents reported in Hawaii in 2004, though nearly 59 percent of substance use treatment admissions (excluding alcohol) were for primary methamphetamine use during the first six months of 2004. As of 2007, Missouri leads the United States in drug-lab seizures, with 1,268 incidents reported. Often canine units are used for detecting rolling meth labs which can be concealed on large vehicles, or transported on something as small as a motorcycle. These labs are more difficult to detect than stationary ones, and can often be obscured among legal cargo in big trucks.

Methamphetamine is sometimes used intravenously, placing users and their partners at risk for transmission of HIV and hepatitis C. "Meth" can also be inhaled, most commonly vaporized on aluminum foil or in a glass pipe. This method is reported to give "an unnatural high" and a "brief intense rush".

In South Africa, methamphetamine is called "tik" or "tik-tik". Known locally as "tik", the substance was virtually unknown as late as 2003. Now, it is the country's main addictive substance, even when alcohol is included. Children as young as eight are abusing the substance, smoking it in crude glass vials made from light bulbs. Since methamphetamine is easy to produce, the substance is manufactured locally in staggering quantities.

The government of North Korea currently operates methamphetamine production facilities. There, the drug is used as medicine because no alternatives are available; it also is smuggled across the Chinese border.

The Australian Crime Commission's illicit drug data report for 2011–2012 stated that the average strength of crystal methamphetamine doubled in most Australian jurisdictions within a 12-month period, and the majority of domestic laboratory closures involved small "addict-based" operations.

=== Temazepam ===
Temazepam, a strong hypnotic benzodiazepine, is illicitly manufactured in clandestine laboratories (called jellie labs) to supply the increasingly high demand for the drug internationally. Many clandestine temazepam labs are in Eastern Europe. The labs manufacture temazepam by chemically altering diazepam, oxazepam or lorazepam. "Jellie labs" have been identified and shut down in Russia, Ukraine, Latvia and Belarus.

=== Cocaine ===
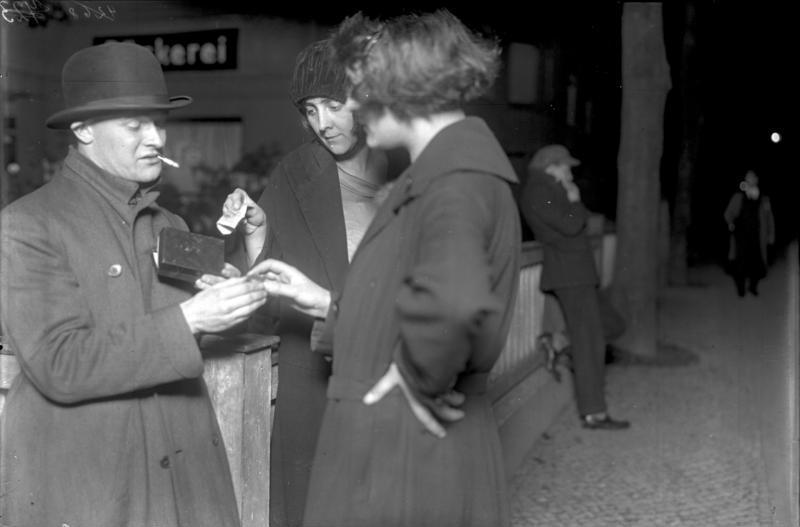
Prostitutes buy cocaine capsules from a drug dealer in Berlin, 1930. The capsules sold for 5 Reichsmark each (equivalent to €18 in 2021).

Cocaine is a highly-trafficked prohibited drug. The value of the global market for illicit cocaine was estimated at between $94 and $143 billion in 2017. In 2022, illicit sales in Europe were estimated at $11.1 billion. In 2020, almost 2,000 tons of cocaine were produced for distribution through illicit markets.

=== Fentanyl ===
Fentanyl is a synthetic opioid with a potency 20 to 40 times that of heroin and 100 times that of morphine; its primary legal utilization is in pain management for cancer patients and those recovering from painful surgeries. Illicit use of fentanyl continues to fuel an epidemic of synthetic opioid drug overdose deaths in the US. From 2011 to 2021, synthetic opioid deaths per year increased from 2,600 overdoses to 70,601. Since 2018, fentanyl and its analogues have been responsible for most drug overdose deaths in the US, causing over 71,238 deaths in 2021. Fentanyl is often mixed, cut, or ingested alongside other drugs, including cocaine and heroin, to boost their effects. The fentanyl epidemic has erupted into a highly acrimonious dispute between the US and Mexican governments. While US officials blame the flood of fentanyl crossing the border primarily on Mexican crime groups utilizing Chinese precursors, former Mexican President Andrés Manuel López Obrador insisted that the main source of this synthetic drug was Asia. He argued that the crisis of a lack of family values in the US drives people to use the drug.

== See also ==
- Allegations of CIA drug trafficking
- Arguments for and against drug prohibition
- Corruption
- Counterfeit medications
- Counterfeit money
- Environmental impact of illicit drug production
- Rum running
- Illicit cigarette trade
- Human trafficking
- Arms trafficking
- Wildlife trafficking
- Illegal organ trade
- Drug liberalization
- Drug trafficking organizations
- Golden Crescent
- Golden Triangle (Southeast Asia)
- Illegal drug trade in the Indian Ocean region
- Maritime drug smuggling into Australia
- Narco-capitalism
- Narco-state
- Narcoterrorism
- Organized crime
- Operation Show Me How

=== International coordination ===
- International Day Against Drug Abuse and Illicit Trafficking
- Interpol
- United Nations Convention Against Illicit Traffic in Narcotic Drugs and Psychotropic Substances
