= Drug trafficking in Mauritius =

Common illegal drugs include marijuana and opiates. According to the 2011 United Nations Drug Report, the small population of Mauritius has a prevalence of opiate consumption of 0.91%, while 3.9% of the population are regular cannabis consumers. Drug smugglers also use Mauritius as a stop over especially during their voyage to the east coast of Africa.

== History ==
Consumption of illegal drugs on the island is not a recent phenomenon. Following the abolition of slavery in 1835, Mauritius, then a British colony, experienced an inflow of indentured labourers from India who introduced cannabis to the island. During the same period, immigrants from China brought opium to the island. These drugs mainly served traditional purposes and were not of serious public concern.

In the late 1970s, "brown sugar", a form of heroin, was introduced. Drug consumption deviated from its rather disciplined socio-cultural use and drug use proliferated. Mass drug proliferation was further aided by the development of extensive air and sea networks to Africa, South and Southeast Asia and Europe, combined with a free port.

With drug smuggling rising, local social centres noted a huge rise in the number of child and teenage addicts. Drug addiction in Mauritius has led to the proliferation of prostitution, thefts and armed attack.

== Narco-politics ==
The connection between drug trafficking and Mauritian politics came to light in 1985 when the Amsterdam Boys Scandal broke out. Serge Thomas, Ismaël Nawoor, Dev Kim Currun, and Sattyanand Pelladoah, who were elected members of the Mauritius National Legislative Assembly, and who formed part of the ruling MSM-Labour-PMSD coalition, were arrested at Schiphol Airport in December 1985 with 20 kilograms (44 lb) of heroin in their suitcase while travelling under the cover of diplomatic passports. Maya Hanoomanjee, then Permanent Secretary and later elected Minister and High Commissioner to India, had issued diplomatic passports on a weekend to allow the 4 politicians to travel to Amsterdam.

The High Commissioner of Mauritius in Great Britain, the Vatican and West Germany, Soo Soobiah, and his wife Muriel were arrested on 18 February 1989 at their residence in Surrey, England, on charges of disposing of drug proceeds, that is, laundering $670,800 of their son Nigel's drug profits. Nigel Sevan Soobiah (now known as Sivan Subiah) had been tracked for months by the FBI as an international heroin dealer. In addition, he was a key contact for the four Amsterdam boys.

== Treatment ==
Historically, the system convicted drug addicts rather than offering them treatment.

However, in January 2006, the methadone substitution therapy was implemented to help treat drug addicts. To emphasize its new strategy of treatment rather than conviction, the government made needle exchanges legal in November 2007, when it launched, in collaboration with the Collectif Urgence Toxida (CUT), a needle exchange programme.

The main centres responsible for treating drug addiction are:

- The National Centre for Rehabilitation of Drug Addicts
- Dr. Idrice Goomany Treatment Centre
- The Mauritius Sanathan Dharma Temples Federation
- Centre d'Accueil de Terre Rouge.

The carceral system also attempts to reform drug offenders through their Treatment and Rehabilitation Programme.

== The Anti-Drug and Smuggling Unit ==
The drug situation in Mauritius led to the restructuring of the Anti-Drug and Smuggling Unit (ADSU). The following responsibilities were given to the ADSU:

- Suppress the supply of illicit drugs
- Arrest drug offenders and have them prosecuted
- Locate and destroy all cannabis plantations
- Prevent and detect smuggling.

Besides fighting drug proliferation directly through the detection and prevention of drug offences, the ADSU jointly conducts sensitization campaigns, targeting different layers of the population, with the National Agency for the Treatment and Rehabilitation of Substance Abusers (NATReSA). In 2016, the Minister of Health criticized the National Agency for the Treatment And Rehabilitation of Substances Abuses for failing to prevent drug abuse.
