= Environmental impact of illicit drug production =

The environmental impacts caused by the production of illicit drugs are an often-neglected topic when analyzing the effects of such substances. However, due to the clandestine nature of illicit drug production, its effects can be highly destructive yet difficult to detect and measure. The consequences differ depending upon the drug being produced, but can be largely categorized into impacts caused by natural drugs or caused by synthetic/semi-synthetic drugs. Natural drugs refer to drugs which are primarily extracted from a natural source, such as cocaine or cannabis. Synthetic drugs are produced from materials that cannot be found in nature, and semi-synthetic drugs are made from both natural and synthetic materials, such as methamphetamine and MDMA. Drug policy is a large determinant of how organisations produce drugs and thereby, how their processes affect the environment, thus prompting government bodies to analyze the current drug policy. It is inevitable that solutions to such environmental impacts are synonymous with solutions to overall illicit drug production. However, many have noted the reactionary measures taken by government bodies and elevated the need for preventive measures instead.

== Environmental impacts of natural drugs ==
Natural drugs are those whose constituents are primarily extracted from natural sources, such as cocaine or marijuana. The environmental impacts associated with such drugs include deforestation, watershed depletion and greenhouse gas emissions.

=== Marijuana ===
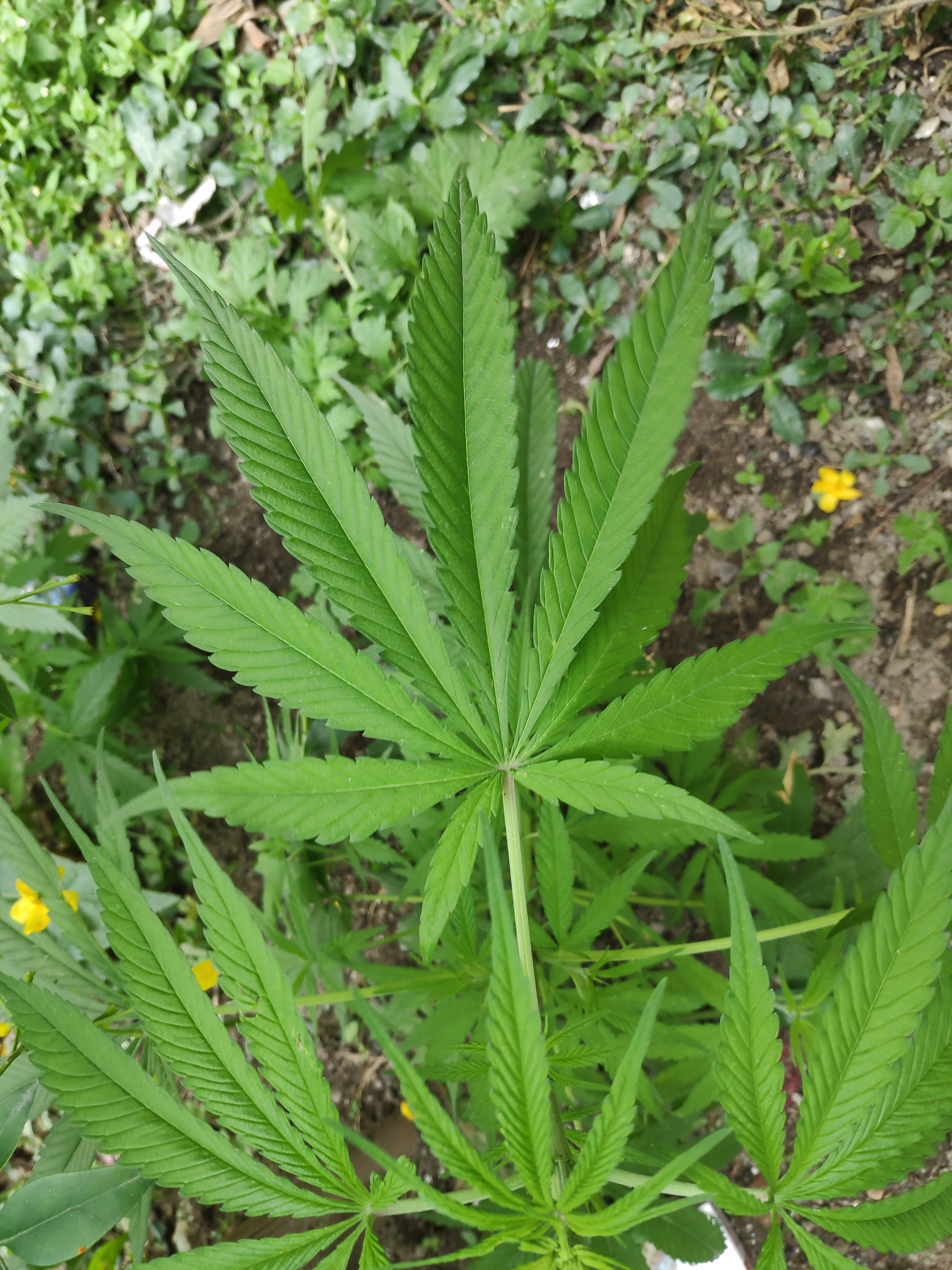
Cannabis plant

With the ease of access to marijuana increasing due to legalization in parts of North America and Canada, many have noted the increasing importance of measuring its possible environmental ramifications. As marijuana has been previously illegal in these areas, there is now an opportunity to measure these outcomes. However, there have already been a variety of known consequences caused by the production of marijuana.

Watershed depletion is a serious issue that can be caused by marijuana production. Marijuana cultivation requires large amounts of water, where a single plant can require 8–10 gallons of water per day. This sparks concern, especially in areas susceptible to water shortages such as California. California is the largest producer of marijuana in the U.S yet has had issues surrounding water supply and sanitation for a number of years. In 2012, it was estimated that at least 3,177,241,050 gallons of water were used in the production of marijuana in California. Thus, marijuana production can have severe implications on watershed levels, with a number of organizations calling for stricter regulations as marijuana becomes more widespread.

The production of marijuana also requires large amounts of energy due to the control of environmental conditions. This further causes high levels of greenhouse gas emissions and energy consumption. "In 2015, the average electricity consumption of a 5,000-square-foot indoor facility in Boulder County was 41,808 kilowatt-hours per month, while an average household in the county used about 630 kilowatt-hours". Such high levels of energy consumption, in turn, result in high greenhouse gas emissions. In 2016, it was estimated that on average, the production of one kilogram of marijuana produced 4,600 kilograms of carbon dioxide. Thus, marijuana cultivation produces 15 million metric tons of carbon dioxide in the United States in a single year.

=== Cocaine ===
Most of the world's cocaine is produced in South America, particularly in the Andean region. The environmental destruction caused by the production of cocaine has been well documented, with reports made to the UN and other government bodies. Due to the illegal nature of coca production, farmers make little effort in soil conservation and sustainability practices, as seen in the high mobility and short lifespan of coca plots in Colombia.

One of the major implications of cocaine production is deforestation, as large areas of forest are cleared for coca cultivation. The UNODC approximated that 97,622 hectares of primary forest were cleared for coca cultivation during 2001–2004 in the Andean region. This further causes habitat destruction, especially in biodiversity hotspots, areas rich in a variety of species. Such areas are chosen for coca cultivation due to their remote locations, minimising chances of detection. Deforestation has further impacts of soil erosion, which further inhibits the survival of native species.

The use of pesticides can also severely affect the environment. Farmers are able to use unregulated and highly toxic pesticides due to the clandestine nature of drug production. The use of such pesticides can have both direct and indirect effects on the ecosystem. Where lethal levels of exposure directly cause the death of fauna, which is further carried up the food chain, secondary feeders who consume the poisoned animals are also impacted. Furthermore, non-lethal levels of exposure can also cause weaker immune system development and neurological issues, further increasing mortality rates.

== Environmental impacts of synthetic/semi-synthetic drugs ==
Synthetic drugs are produced from materials that cannot be found in nature. Semi-synthetic drugs are a hybrid of both synthetic and natural drugs. However, as both synthetic and semi-synthetic drugs undergo an array of chemical processes during production, their environmental impact is quite similar.

=== Methamphetamine ===
Methamphetamine or meth is a synthetic drug which can be produced on a domestic scale.

The dumping of toxic waste is a major issue associated with the production of meth. It has been approximated that for each pound of meth produced, five pounds of toxic waste are also generated. The methods of disposal of these substances can be extremely damaging to the environment, as producers may simply pour them down the sink or toilet. However, such methods allow producers to be more easily detected; thus, producers sometimes adopt more environmentally destructive methods such as leaving waste in remote locations such as forests or burying it underground, where the waste can harm flora and fauna. Producers have also used specialized trucks or vans, equipped with pumps and hoses, to drain waste onto the road as the vehicle moves. This decreases their chance of detection yet spreads the damage caused by the toxic waste.

The production of meth also produces a number of toxic gases that can harm the human respiratory system and devastate the environment. High levels of phosphine gas can be produced during meth production, which can further cause headaches, convulsions and death. The production of meth further produces hydrogen chloride gas, which, when released into the environment, causes damage to metal structures and buildings. Hydrogen chloride is also highly soluble and readily dissolves into water bodies, where it can harm aquatic life. This high solubility also causes it to be quickly washed out by rain in the atmosphere, further causing acid rain, where high levels of such rain can have drastic impacts on the environment.

== Environmental impacts of drug policy ==
Drug policy is a determining factor in drug production as it partially dictates the methods through which illicit drugs are produced and transported. Thus, when determining such policies, the environmental consequences are sometimes overlooked, resulting in effects which magnify the damage done to the environment. This is apparent in coca cultivation in the Andean Region, where drug policy has forced producers into more remote locations to avoid detection. In such ungoverned areas, producers maximise their damage through deforestation and toxic pesticide use, destroying these resource-rich areas. These effects of drug policy have been noted by a number of government bodies, including the UNDP, which stated that some eradication campaigns "have not eradicated illicit production but rather displaced it to new areas of greater environmental significance."

Policies involving drug trafficking have also had adverse effects on the environment. One key aspect of drug trafficking is the need to establish landing areas, usually by clearing land and deforestation. Once established, such areas further accelerate other illegal trafficking activities such as wildlife, marine and timber trafficking, as drug traffickers may diversify their operations to expand their networks. Furthermore, as government policies restrict the movement of traffickers, they must find alternative and more remote routes to transport their materials. These alternate routes typically require further land clearing and habitat destruction, thus further harming the environment.

Drug policy can further inhibit biodiversity conservation. As drug policy can displace the actions of traffickers and producers into more biodiverse locations, their impact on global biodiversity is magnified. As producers relocate to more remote locations, their actions of deforestation and dumping of toxic materials such as kerosene and hydrochloric acid can greatly damage biodiversity. Furthermore, anti-drug initiatives and policies can further drain funding and diminish resources available for environmental protection initiatives. Areas known for illicit drug production can further discourage tourism, conservation activists and local law enforcement. This allows drug producers to conduct themselves with more freedom and thereby increase their damage. Furthermore, the lack of tourism in such areas limits the revenue of local conservation efforts and the transparency of these issues.

== Possible solutions ==
Due to the nature of illicit drug production, it is inevitable that solutions to these environmental issues are synonymous with overall drug production prevention. However, by taking environmental impacts into account when formulating drug policies, it is possible to better mitigate this damage. Changes in approach have been highlighted as a key method to help target these environmental concerns. This involves analyzing these environmental impacts when assessing the effects of illicit drugs and informing the illicit drug consumer base and law-makers of these impacts.

Improved cooperation between international, national and regional-level organizations allows for a more informed and sustainable solution to drug production. Previous collaborative efforts have involved more reactive responses, which more or less displaced drug operations rather than preventing them. A more integrated response across different organizations allows for more preventive measures to be implemented. Furthermore, as many of the environmental impacts occur in transit countries, not just countries of origin, greater integration between different organizations could allow for preventive policies in transit countries to be established. An example of this improved cooperation can be seen in Plan Colombia, which saw the collaboration between the U.S. and the Colombian Government to combat drug production. The project saw a decrease in coca cultivation in Colombia from 160,000 hectares to 48,000 hectares and a decrease in the drug-related economy from US$7.5 billion to US$4.5 billion from 2008 to 2013.

Quelling the demand for illicit drugs has also been considered as a solution to the environmental impacts involved with drug production. That is, by reassessing current anti-drug propaganda and intertwining drug-related health issues with the environmental impacts of illicit drug production, a decrease in demand may be achieved. Shifting the approach of current advertisements to focus on such issues may better inform the public and consumers of illicit drugs of these environmental problems. This notion can be further carried into children's drug education, where placing greater emphasis on the environmental effects alongside the traditional and well-known health effects may incite a greater reaction. It has also been suggested that, besides just revealing these issues, it is important for advertising bodies to communicate the contribution individuals make by consuming illicit drugs, thereby increasing their sense of self-worth and lessening their dependence on illicit drugs. Enlightening more consumers of such problems may also attract a larger audience and support for anti-drug solutions. However, even if such a response fails to stem demand, shedding light on these issues may foster concerned voters who still may appeal to legislators.
