= Operation Show Me How =

International drug enforcement operation coordinated by Interpol

Operation Show Me How was an international drug enforcement operation coordinated by Interpol which began around January 1998.

Interpol is an international agency that coordinates police intelligence and multi-lateral information sharing. International drugs-related operations like Operation Show Me How are a standard part of its mission.

This operation was given the name "Show Me How" because some heroin being smuggled from Thailand was discovered in hollowed out books from a series from that same name.

== The operation ==
At some point prior to January 1998, a United Kingdom agency was investigating the international origins of drugs being delivered in small packages to hotels within the United Kingdom. In January 1998, the agency asked Interpol to circulate a data request for drug seizures relating to small packages delivered to hotels.

As is typical of their standard mode of information sharing and cooperation between police agencies, Interpol circulated a request for data searches for this case to around 50 countries and several matches were found. The seizures were mainly in Europe, the heroin from each of these reported seizures had links to Bangkok, Thailand as each parcel seized was posted in Bangkok through express mail. Further, each seized parcel was sent to a European city close to an international airport, such as Heathrow and Frankfurt Airport. After a meeting with international police officials at their headquarters in Lyon, France, Interpol launched Operation Show Me How (named after books which some heroin had been found in).

The investigation uncovered Nigerian criminal gangs running heroin from Bangkok and Pakistan and opium and cocaine from Bogotá, Colombia. The operation also contributed to undermining the activity of these gangs in the Czech Republic.

In 1999, Interpol suggested that all its member countries should monitor the type of postal system drug smuggling investigated by Operation Show Me How and other operations.

Between 1998 and 2000, Operation Show Me How resulted in many seizures of heroin and opium and a significant number of arrests in various countries., notably in Slovenia, Slovakia, the Czech Republic, Croatia, Niger, South Africa, Zimbabwe, Peru, and Brazil.
