= Illegal drug trade in the Indian Ocean region =

Illicit drug trafficking in the West Indian Ocean (WIO) has increasingly become a major security concern for many States in the region, and is gaining international attention. The Indian Ocean borders 24 states, and accounts for a third of the world’s ocean area. Until recently, other challenges, such as piracy off the coast of Somalia, has been at the forefront of international action. However, the utilisation of the Southern route by drug traffickers, and the consequent issues this has caused, has led to increased focus on how to tackle this issue.

The two main producers of heroin for the global market are frequently referred to as the Golden Triangle, including Myanmar, Thailand and Laos, and the Golden Crescent, which includes Afghanistan, Pakistan and Iran. Specifically Afghanistan and Pakistan as the two largest heroin and opium producers and exporters via the WIO. The three traditional ways of drug trafficking out of Afghanistan are; the Balkan route through Iran and Turkey via Eastern Europe to western and central European markets; the Northern Route via central Asia to Russia; and the Southern Route through Pakistan and across the Indian Ocean to Eastern African States and onward to consumer markets predominantly in Europe, Asia and the US. The increased use of the southern route via the WIO may be contributed to many factors, including better law enforcement on land-based routes, and the relatively weak enforcement measures concerning trafficking at sea.

The international nature of the high seas, means they have limited policing capabilities, which makes the oceans particularly vulnerable to the illicit drug trade. Excluding the 12 - 24 nautical miles surrounding each of the littoral states, the oceans are generally not owned by any particular country. Except for in their territorial waters, law enforcement ships can do very little in terms of policing unless a vessel is registered to their own country. These problems are heightened by a lack of international agreement and cooperation, resulting in an absence of sufficient legal infrastructure to handle the problem. This problem has been overcome previously, as laws have been implemented to enable the boarding of ships in relation to other maritime crimes, such as piracy, but this has not yet been effectively implemented in regards to drug trafficking. In practice, this has meant that vessels suspected of trafficking these illegal substances cannot be boarded by law enforcement, and thus face no legal consequences. Traffickers have taken advantage of this, and are increasingly capitalising on illicit trade through maritime routes. Of the 400 million containers shipped worldwide in 2009, only 2% of these were inspected.

== Key Drivers of Drug Trafficking via the Southern Route ==
Drug trafficking activities in the WIO are influenced by a complex interplay of various factors. In addition to its strategic geographical location in close proximity to major drug-producing countries such as those of the Golden Crescent, and the limited law enforcement, political instability in many of the countries along the Southern Route may further exacerbate the problem. Illicit trade, such as drug trafficking, is often found in fragile states as an additional or alternative source of income. The political instability in Pakistan and Afghanistan, especially after the withdrawal of the US Troops from Afghanistan is likely to have influenced the increasing poppy yield in Afghanistan requiring shipping. According to the Fragile State Index (2023), the vast majority of states in the WIO are ranked under the ‘warning’ or ‘alert’ categories, including Afghanistan, which is ranked 106.6 out of the maximum 120. Globalisation may also have influenced trafficking routes, as global licit trade has increased, with about half of the worlds container traffic passing through the WIO, which presents ample opportunities for traffickers to take advantage of the existing shipping infrastructure.

== Affected areas ==
Many states are directly affected by the drug trade that occurs in the Indian Ocean region, both economically and socially. These detrimental effects are felt throughout many different countries, in a variety of ways, such as a possible increase in drug use by the populations and heightened levels of corruption.

=== Afghanistan ===
Afghanistan makes up almost two thirds of the land under illicit opium poppy cultivation in the world. The opiate trade originating in Afghanistan fuels the corruption throughout the country by funding the Taliban and their activities. This has been confirmed through drug seizures made by the CMF, who have concluded that the drugs originated from areas in Afghanistan controlled by the Taliban, by using a combination of the drug stamps found on the bags of heroin, and the isotope testing of the poppy gum. The UNODC estimated that in 2009 alone, the Taliban received 140-170 million USD from the opiate trade. This has also had social implications for the population, with an estimated 2 - 2.5 million people using drugs in Afghanistan alone.

=== Bay of Bengal ===
India’s size and position means it has multiple roles in the southern route, both as a destination country and transit point for further destinations. The UNODC has estimated that 54% of the heroin in India is produced domestically, while 45% originates from Afghanistan. India is particularly vulnerable to the southern route due to its western border with Pakistan. Near this border, in the western Indian states of Punjab and Haryana, is where many of the heroin seizures occur. In 2012, 105 kg of drugs were seized, which had been trafficked from Pakistan along rail routes. In 2013 alone, the Indian Narcotics Control Bureau reported seizures totalling 4,609 kg. Data collected through seizures by various authorities has confirmed India as a transit country for Southeast Asia, West Africa and North America.

Bangladesh also faces significant problems due to drug trade through the Indian Ocean and India. The country suffers from illicit drug use among its population, such as in Dhaka where there are an estimated 2.5 million people using drugs. India is a large provider of heroin to the Bangladeshi market, and it is trafficked over the western and eastern borders. However, it is unclear whether the heroin originates from Afghanistan or India, as this data has not been sufficiently collected. Both India and Bangladesh are becoming ever more dependent on maritime trade, with these states importing over US$52 million and US$447 million respectively. Therefore, to function effectively they require an absence of maritime crime in order for trade to be uninterrupted, and for their economies to thrive.

Sri Lanka has also faced an increase in heroin use within the country, as well as becoming a transit country for trafficking destined for other places. Much of the heroin entering Sri Lanka arrives on fishing boats or by air, often coming through India or Pakistan. The numbers of seizures which Sri Lankan authorities have conducted remains relatively small, meaning that the data collected is not always reliable. Smugglers in Sri Lanka have come from a variety of countries, including Pakistan, India, Iran and the Maldives.

=== East Africa ===
Heroin from Afghanistan enters East Africa through the Swahili Coast, from the Indian Ocean. Many of the countries in East Africa affected by drug trafficking along the southern route have high poverty levels, poor governance and security challenges. This is exacerbated by ongoing tensions and conflicts within the region, making these states especially vulnerable to organised crime and the threat of exploitation that these criminal groups pose. Heroin seizures have indicated an increase in drug flow to the region, and further utilisation of the southern route. This has led to a growth in drug use and a rise in drug injecting in countries such as Mauritius, South Africa, Nigeria and Kenya. Opiates often reach East African on dhows, which are traditional trading ships originating in Arab and South Asian countries. Dhows used for smuggling have been caught carrying up to 1,000 kg of heroin. These East African countries do have their own consumer markets for drugs, but they are also heavily used as trans-shipment ports for routes which continue onwards e.g. to Europe.

==== Mauritius ====
Mauritius is just one example of an island state which is used as a stopover by drug smugglers intending to continue their journey onwards, often to the coast of Africa. This has been particularly problematic for Mauritius, as it has had numerous social effects for the population. Facilitators in Mauritius, and other trans-shipment states, are often paid with product which means they sell it to locals. Therefore, consumer markets develop locally, thus increasing demand and drug-dependency. Drug abuse is a significant problem within Mauritius, which is regularly evidenced by the ‘World Drug Report’. In 2008, the report illustrated that 2% of the population of Mauritius were affected by the use of opioids, such as heroin. A significant proportion of these drugs enter the country through the coastline, which has been linked to a lack of surveillance in these places and the surrounding maritime areas. Many of the illicit substances enter on private yachts, which are not regularly checked. In 2012, a steward previously involved in drug trafficking, expressed that the conditions of the maritime environment made smuggling simple as the oceans are so vast and avoiding capture is easy. A 1986 report from the CIA expressed concern over the entry of illegal drugs to Mauritius, stating that these were both consumed locally and smuggled onwards to South Africa. Therefore, this has been a long-standing problem, which has become entrenched in Mauritian society. These drugs largely originate from Pakistan, India and South Africa, and are smuggled through the Indian Ocean.

== Policy responses ==
There have been responses from both individual states and international forces, but neither have yet controlled the illicit drug trade throughout the region.

Navies have been a core part of this response, often reacting prior to foreign policy guidance. There have been some notable actions among these coast guards and navies, including some cross-state collaboration. The Indian Navy has established cooperative activities with South East Asia, and has also assisted East African and island states. The Bangladesh Navy has also prioritised maritime security as an essential element to the stability of the country, so that they can benefit from the blue economy for economic development. In order to establish the security necessary for this, they have facilitated joint exercises with the US Navy and Special Force in the Exclusive Economic zone, which both Japan and India have partaken in during the last decade. The Bangladesh Navy has also engaged in specific anti-smuggling operations, which target drug trafficking. Additionally, the Asian coastguard has been given specialised training and technical equipment to tackle the maritime drug trade, both in the Bay of Bengal and Southeast Asian waters.

There have also been a number of notable regional responses among the states affected by the illicit maritime drug trade, which is evident throughout the policy of these countries. The Southern African Development Community (SADC) has established an operative maritime committee working towards regional coordination. The SADC has specifically emphasised the importance of combating non-traditional maritime threats as part of the 2050 Integrated Maritime Strategy. The Bay of Bengal Initiative for Multi-Sectoral Technical and Economic Cooperation (BIMSTEC), has enabled the states within the Bay of Bengal to create greater maritime security through collaboration between countries. Furthermore, BIMSTEC has launched a Convention on Cooperation in Combating International Terrorism, Organised Crime and Illicit Drug Trafficking. This facilitates regional cooperation specific to the illicit drug trade, and provides the region with the foundations to develop their response further.

The existing regional and individual responses by states have, in practice, been limited to seizure-based responses. This is due to gaps in the current legal infrastructure, which prevent effective prosecution of smugglers following drug seizures. Huge drug seizures have been made by both the Combined Maritime Forces (CMF) and the Combined task force (CTF), such as when the CTF successfully seized 6.2 tonnes of hashish over two days. However, gaps in the current laws prevent further action. One such example is Article 110 of the UNSC Law of the Sea Convention 1982, which does not include a suspicion of drug smuggling as a legitimate reason to board a vessel without gaining permission from the ship’s flagged country. This has decreased the amount of possible seizures, and gaining permission to board vessels is complicated by insufficient regional cooperation within the criminal justice system. Even when seizures do occur, the lack of legal coordination means criminals are released without prosecution, and often continue to engage in the drug trade.

== Responses in Practice ==
Responses to illicit drug trafficking in the WIO are multifaceted, encompassing various approaches across law enforcement, prosecution, and capacity building. In regards to law enforcement in ports, many States are guided by the standards and measurements in the International Ship and Port Security (ISPS) code. However, authorised law enforcement at sea is more complex as it depends on where a vessel is registered and in what maritime zone the offence is committed, as well as which international agreements have been ratified by the responding state. State coalitions and navies are increasingly seen responding to drug trafficking corporately, while external drug agencies, such as the US Drug Enforcement Administration (DEA) and the UK’s National Crime Agency (NCA) are also present at different locations along the Southern Route with office locations. The most effective response to heroin trafficking in the WIO is the multinational naval coalition called Combined Maritime Forces Combines Task Force 150 (CMF). Due to the proportion of the WIO the CMF relies heavily on intelligence, as the area is simply too big to be present at all times. Additionally, the authorised boarding of a vessel requires permission from the flag state, which may decide to exercise its sovereignty and refuse the authorisation, limiting law enforcement practices. Challenges with prosecution persist due to the current law enforcement practices on the high sea. Once drug shipments have been seized by the CMF navies, vessels and crew are free to go, and there have therefore been no prosecutions of foreign flagged or stateless vessels involved in drug trafficking on the high sea of the WIO. This is problematic as it does not prevent the crew and vessel from returning with a new shipment. Capacity building initiatives, funded by countries such as the United States and India aim to improve security capabilities among small island states and coastal states. The support and presence of these states may however also stem from a geopolitical context, with the increasing presence of China in the WIO.

== Global Maritime Crime Programme in the Indian Ocean ==
=== Indian Ocean Forum on Maritime Crime (IOFMC) ===
The IOFMC enables regional cooperation to form operational responses to maritime crime. This has been implemented as part of the GMCP IO reaction to encourage regional responses. This has enabled the formation of the ‘Prosecutors’ Network’, which allows prosecutors from the different coastal states to coordinate their legal strategies. Legislative reform is consequently possible, and legislation on maritime crime can be created. From this, organisations such as the Southern Route Partnership can be developed.

=== Southern Route Partnership (SRP) ===
The SRP is a regional organisation, established through the UNODC’s Global Maritime Crime Programme within the Indian Ocean (GMCP IO). The concept of building the SRP was discussed during the UNODC meeting of the Heads of drug enforcement agencies from the Indian Ocean Region, in October 2016. The SRP involves states directly affected by the use of the southern route for smuggling, with anti-narcotics agencies from countries such as Kenya, South Africa, Sri Lanka, Tanzania, and the Seychelles becoming involved. The organisation aims to combat the smuggling of Afghan opiates through Pakistan, Iran, the Indian Ocean, and further on into East Africa. Partner agencies from a variety of countries and organisations outside of the region, such as the UK’s National Crime Agency, the Royal Canadian Mounted Police, and the Paris Pact Initiative have also been involved in SRP discussions. As of yet, there is little evidence available of how the SRP has been utilised, but it holds potential as a collaborative tool.

== See also ==
- Indian Ocean trade

== Works cited ==
- Bateman, Sam (2016). "Maritime security governance in the Indian Ocean region". Journal of the Indian Ocean. 12 (1): 5–23.
- Afghan Opiate Trafficking Through the Southern Route (PDF) (Report). UNODC. 2015.
- Impacts of Drug Use on Users and their Families in Afghanistan (PDF) (Report). UNODC. 2014.
- Malcolm & Murray, James A. & Linganaden (2017). "Small islands' understanding of Maritime security: the cases of Mauritius and Seychelles". Journal of the Indian Ocean. 13 (2): 234–256.
- McLaughlin, Rob (2016). "Towards a more effective counter-drugs regime in the Indian Ocean". Journal of the Indian Ocean Region. 12 (1): 24–38. doi:10.1080/19480881.2016.1138710.
