= Drug Law Reform Australia =

- Founder: Greg Chipp
- Founded: 2013
- Dissolved: 31 July 2017
- Headquarters: Victoria
- Ideology: Drug policy reform

Website
- www.druglawreform.com.au

Drug Law Reform Australia was a political party in Australia. The aims of the party were to create a new regulatory system for illegal drugs in Australia, and influence the political debate around drug use towards decriminalisation and harm minimisation. The party is the outshoot of community groups lobbying elected politicians about the social effects of criminal drug prohibition, such as the community group Family and Friends of Drug Law Reform.

== Foundation ==
Greg Chipp, son of Australian Democrats' leader Don Chipp, founded the party with other drug law reform activists in 2013 to encourage a debate about alternative drug policy. Policy based on human rights, and pragmatic evidence based public health approaches to illegal drug use and reducing stigma and criminal ramifications for people who use illegal substances. The party registered with the Australian Electoral Commission in July 2013.

== Policy context ==
In 2010, Australia’s drug law enforcement budget was $1.1 billion. Around every ten minutes someone in Australia is arrested for a drug violation, with 112,049 arrests in 2013–14.

=== National Drug Strategy 2016–25 ===
The draft National Drug Strategy 2016–25 reported that "during the period of the National Drug Strategy 2010–2015, evidence informed demand, supply and harm reduction strategies yielded positive results". However, the same draft strategy informs that in 2011–12, police made 76,083 drug seizures; the highest number of drug seizures in the last decade. The same year, 809 clandestine laboratories were detected nationwide; the highest number ever detected in Australia. In 2012–13, police made the second highest number of detections ever at 757. The report did not comment on whether this is due to an increase in police activity or drug availability. There is also no reference to harm caused by legislation or any indication of a review of drug laws. The new strategy is to operate for the next 10 years, to 2025, without questioning the underlying criminal punishment approach to illegal drug use.

== 2013 Federal election ==
The party contested the September 2013 federal election three months after the party's official registration, with candidates in several jurisdictions (Victoria, South Australia, New South Wales and the Australian Capital Territory). Candidates received over 10,000 primary votes nationally in aggregate, but did not win any seats in the Australian Parliament.

== 2016 federal election ==
Drug Law Reform Australia proposed to nominate candidates for the Senate in the 2016 federal election in the states of New South Wales, Victoria and South Australia and the Australian Capital Territory. When nominations closed, it had actually fielded senate candidates in New South Wales, Queensland and Victoria, and a total of 11 candidates for seats in the House of Representatives in the same states.

=== Election results ===
The party received over 20,000 votes in the 2016 election, or 0.2% of the total votes.

== Deregistration ==
The party requested voluntary deregistration with the Australian Electoral Commission in July 2017. The party was officially deregistered on 31 July 2017.

== See also ==
- Australian National Council on Drugs
- Drug courts in Australia
- Drug liberalisation
- Drug prohibition law
- Illicit drug use in Australia
- Legalise Cannabis Australia
- Legalising Cannabis Bill 2023
- Maritime drug smuggling into Australia
- Methamphetamine use in Australia
- Reason Party
