= Arnold "Puggy" Hunter =

Australian activist (1951–2001)

Arnold "Puggy" Hunter (14 August 1951 – 3 September 2001) was a pioneer in Australian Aboriginal health and recipient of the 2001 Australian Human Rights Medal.

Hunter was the elected chairperson of the National Aboriginal Community Controlled Health Organisation, (NACCHO), which is the peak national advisory body on Aboriginal health. NACCHO has a membership of over 100 Aboriginal Community Controlled Health Services and is the representative body of these services. He was the inaugural Chair of NACCHO from 1991 until his death.

Hunter was the vice-chairperson of the Aboriginal and Torres Strait Islander Health Council, the Federal Health Minister's main advisory body on Aboriginal health established in 1996. He was also Chair of the National Public Health Partnership Aboriginal and Islander Health Working Group which reports to the Partnership and to the Australian Health Ministers Advisory Council. He was a member of the Australian Pharmaceutical Advisory Council (APAC), the General Practice Partnership Advisory Council, the Joint Advisory Group on Population Health and the National Health Priority Areas Action Council as well as a number of other key Aboriginal health policy and advisory groups on national issues.

Hunter had a long role in the struggle for justice for Aboriginal people. He was born in Darwin in 1951, where his parents had fled Broome and Western Australian native welfare policies.

He was quoted in Australian Parliament as saying: "You white people have the hearing problems because you do not seem to hear us." To honour the efforts of Dr. Hunter the Australian government allocated the Puggy Hunter Memorial Scholarship Scheme (PHMSS). the fund was to help Australian Aboriginal and Torres Strait Islander people to succeed in health careers.
