= Network Against Prohibition =

Australian drug law reform activist group

Network Against Prohibition (NAP) is an Australian drug law reform activist group. It was organised on 7 March 2002, in Darwin, Northern Territory to response to the Australian Labor Party's drug house legislation. The organisations goal is to end prohibition of recreational drug use and draw attention to the human rights abuses faced by illicit drug advocates. The organisation provides a number of services, including needle exchanges, community smoke-ins, and an email newsletter. A number of NAP members were arrested for disturbing the Northern Territory's legislative assembly in 2002.

NAP belongs to the Australian Injecting and Illicit Drug Users League (AIVL) and International Coalition of NGO's for Just and Effective Drugs Policy (ICN).

== See also ==
- Australian National Council on Drugs
- Illicit drug use in Australia
- Legalise Cannabis Australia
