= Australian Injecting and Illicit Drug Users League =

The Australian Injecting & Illicit Drug Users League (AIVL) is the peer-led peak organisation and harm reduction network advancing the wellbeing, health and human rights of the millions of people who use drugs illicitly (PWUD) in Australia and representing peer-based Drug User Organisations (DUOs) and also support the capacity building of peer-based harm reduction programs and networks in the Asia-Pacific region. AIVL is based in Sydney but fully decentralised, as of 2023, for a better diverse representation. AIVL host on its website: harm reduction, advocacy, research and drug policy resources, an online training platform for PWUD, harm reduction peer workers and healthcare allies, and the AIVL NSP Directory.

== International Drug Users Remembrance Day ==
International Drug Users Remembrance Day is a health awareness day observed on 21 July each year. It is a day where friends and family can meet together to memorialise and remember loved ones whose lives were cut short due to drug use and the criminalisation and stigmatisation of people who use drugs.

It is also a day to remember everyone who has worked to advance the health and human rights of people who use drugs, many of whom have provided services borne out of civil disobedience such as needle and syringe programs and medically supervised injecting center's which have saved many lives.

When talking about what it meant to him, as a young drug user, Matthew Bonn said:

My grief is personal, and colored by the knowledge that it could easily have been me. At the same time, it’s experienced by millions of others in their own ways.

— Matthew Bonn, What International Drug Users Remembrance Day Means to Me, 21 July 2021

Bonn also talks about specific friends that he had lost to drug use and tells some of their stories.

It is similar to International Overdose Awareness Day (31 August) and International Drug Users Day (1 November).

== See also ==
- Australian National Council on Drugs
- Network Against Prohibition
- Supervised injection site
- Uniting Medically Supervised Injecting Centre
