= Maritime drug smuggling into Australia =

Drug smuggling technique

Maritime drug smuggling into Australia refers to the smuggling of illicit drugs into Australia by sea. While much contemporary Australian media coverage has focused on smaller, more personalised smuggling cases such as the Bali Nine, maritime drug smuggling often allows criminal groups to move illicit drugs and substances into Australia at a much greater scale. This has happened through a variety of ways, including via cargo ship, yacht, and fishing vessels. Key departure locations for drugs aimed to be smuggled into Australia include China, India, Southeast Asia, and the Americas, with much of the drugs trafficked via countries and territories in the South Pacific, in close proximity to Australia.

The key drugs trafficked to Australia by sea are methamphetamine, cocaine, and heroin. Key groups involved in such operations include outlaw motorcycle gangs, Mexican drug cartels, and Asian crime syndicates. Parties that attempt to combat maritime drug smuggling into Australia include the Australian Government, Australian Border Force, Australian Federal Police, Royal Australian Navy, and state police with responses including transnational cooperation, surveillance, maritime patrols, and seizures. Maritime drug smuggling into Australia is still very much a contemporary issue, with ongoing efforts in this area.

== Background ==
The key drugs trafficked into Australia by sea are methamphetamine (and its precursors), most commonly known as ice, as well as cocaine, and heroin. Groups which participate in this practice include Australian outlaw biker gangs, Mexican drug cartels, Asian drug syndicates, and those operating in smaller crime rings. Key groups involved in anti-drug smuggling measures in Australia include the Australian Government, Australian Border Force, Australian Federal Police, State Police Forces, and the Royal Australian Navy.

Australia is seen as an attractive target for criminal organisations involved in maritime drug trafficking due to the high price of drugs in Australia, and high demand for drugs in Australia. A kilogram of methamphetamine in Australia is priced at roughly 80 times the price of its cost in China. A kilogram of cocaine in Sydney would yield roughly $250,000 Australian Dollars, whereas it would cost $16,000 in Brownsville, Texas. Based on information gained from key seizures, some key methods of drug smugglers into Australia include doing so through fishing boats, yachts and large container ships. The final method is one of key concern, as a container ship creates the potential to smuggle large quantities of drugs, with container inspecting capabilities remaining limited.

== Drug types ==
=== Methamphetamine ===
With heroin in Australia becoming less accessible, methamphetamines have risen in popularity and usage within Australia, with an overrepresentation of users in proportion to the population when compared to other nations. As a result, organised crime syndicates have been targeting Australia due to the demand and profits the trafficking of methamphetamine to Australia would yield, with the price of a kilogram of methamphetamine in Australia being roughly 80 times higher than the price in China. 200,000 Australians reported using the drug in 2013, and 60 times as much methamphetamine being seized at the Australian border in 2014 when compared to statistics dating to 2010.

Over 3 tonnes of methamphetamine precursor drugs (mostly manufactured in China and India) were seized between 2012 and 2014. However, despite this increased number of seizures, domestic production of methamphetamine has not decreased, which is a cause of concern. This can be demonstrated by higher numbers of clandestine laboratories being detected in 2014 (744) when compared to 2005 (381).

Due to its profitability, many transnational crime groups have begun to focus on methamphetamine trafficking in Australia, with over 60% of high risk criminal targets on the Australian Criminal Intelligence Commission National Targeting List being involved in the trade, with 45% of this being outlaw motorcycle gangs, who have been known to also partner with other transnational crime groups including Mexican drug cartels, who have in turn been known to deal with not only outlaw motorcycle gangs, but Lebanese, Asian and Albanian groups within Australia. While Australia’s methamphetamine market was traditionally dominated by outlaw motorcycle gangs, the current picture sees increased interaction between these groups and Chinese organised crime groups, with 70% of methamphetamine detections between 2011 and 2016 coming from China.

The increased targeting of Australia as a destination for groups involved in the trafficking of methamphetamines has also led to more actions by groups such as the Australian Border Force and Australian Federal Police. One example is the large, complex bust in the remote Geraldton, Western Australia, where 1.2 tonnes of the drug with a value of $1.04 billion Australian dollars were seized, just a year after the seizure of 182 kilograms of methamphetamines at the same port. While the drugs were destined for the East Coast of Australia, Geraldton seemed to have been selected as initial destination due to its isolation, with only a small population of seasonal fishermen.

A more recent notable example is a drug bust of January 2019, where 1,728 kilograms of methamphetamine with a street value of A$1.29 billion destined for Australia hidden inside loudspeakers were seized at the Port of Los Angeles-Port of Long Beach, This bust also revealed new ties between Australian biker gangs and Mexican drug cartels which further confirmed the belief that Mexican cartels were actively targeting Australia.

=== Cocaine ===
Cocaine in Australia is another drug that is increasing in popularity amongst drug users in Australia, with sharply increasing cocaine seizures in Australia. The majority of the cocaine originates in South and Central America, and much of this is smuggled to Australia via island states in the South Pacific, where cocaine-trafficking cartels have set up base in order to import cocaine into Australia. There is a trend where this cocaine is smuggled aboard yachts travelling to and from Australia and South Pacific states/territories such as Vanuatu, Tahiti, and New Caledonia. Seven hundred kilograms of cocaine smuggled on a yacht was seized by Australian Federal Police in 2011, and another 750 kilograms were seized in 2013. However, cocaine is also smuggled into Australia through freight, the postal system and through couriers. With record prices in Australia, it is self explanatory that groups such as Mexican cartels are targeting Australia. While a kilogram of cocaine sold in the US still represents a profit for the cartel, there is a significant mark-up for that same kilogram in Australia, with a kilogram being worth $16,000 in Brownsville, Texas, and $250,000 in Sydney.

There have been several notable maritime cocaine busts in Australia in recent years. In 2017, 700 kilograms of cocaine moved from Tahiti to the East Coast of Australia in a yacht were seized after a multi-agency investigation involving the Australian Border Force, Australian Criminal Intelligence Commission, Australian Federal Police and New South Wales Police Force.

=== Heroin ===
Heroin use has a rich history in Australia, with opiates being used extensively in the 19th century, eventually leading to prohibition in the mid 1950s. However, the heroin market grew after the Vietnam War and led to large amounts of heroin users and a rise in overdose deaths by the 1980s and 1990s. Although planes were used previously, from the 1990s, heroin traffickers began to utilise modified steel-hulled vessels in order to supply the drug to Australia.

Much of the heroin being consumed between 2006 and 2016 has originated in the Golden Triangle consisting of Myanmar and the Lao People's Democratic Republic, and the Golden Crescent encompassing Pakistan and Afghanistan. Even though heroin use in Australia is not at levels previously seen, the weight of heroin detections did increase from 256.1 kilograms to 513.8 kilograms between 2012 and 2013. The vulnerability of the South Pacific island territories and states are demonstrated further when examining maritime heroin trafficking to Australia with much of these passing through pacific island states and territories including Fiji, Vanuatu and New Caledonia. Organised crime groups in the Greater Mekong Subregion in Southeast Asia, a long-associated area to heroin production, have begun to intensify production and trafficking of methamphetamines, with opium and heroin production in the region declining in 2018.

Heroin trafficking in Australia also had a unique case in the form of the Pong Su incident in 2003, which involved not a criminal syndicate or syndicates, but likely a state, when a North Korea cargo ship was suspected of smuggling 125 kilograms of heroin into Australia, leading to the US Government declaring that it is of high probability that North Korea are engaging in state-sponsored drug trafficking.

== Key routes ==
As established previously, while the drugs being trafficked into Australia do not tend to originate in the South Pacific, much of the drugs do in fact pass through South Pacific states and territories, of which key origin points are South America and Asia. For cocaine, the United Nations Office on Drugs and Crime report that the most important departure countries for Australia-bound cocaine are the United States, Canada, Argentina and Brazil.

The Pacific islands have been viewed as vulnerable to maritime drug trafficking activities for some time, given their location representing a stop-over for Pacific operations between Asia, the Americas and Australia, as well as helping to disguise routes. In addition, the lack of law enforcement capabilities and the existence of corruption complicates matters.

While exact routes taken by maritime drug traffickers targeting Australia will be almost impossible to determine, the common denominator between much of these routes is that the drugs will pass through Pacific Island states and territories on Australia’s doorstep.

Criminal groups are increasingly exploiting vulnerable Pacific states and territories in order to move drugs to the Australian market. Much of these states experience a lack of anti-trafficking capabilities and therefore a lack of ability to independently police their waters. As of 2016, only Fiji, Tonga, the Marshall Islands and the Federated States of Micronesia are party to the United Nations drug control convention in the region.

Much of the drug-related laws in the region cannot keep pace with modern trends, for example criminalising synthetic drugs. The transnational Pacific Drug and Alcohol Research Network has been inactive since 2011 due to financial constraints, and Pacific law enforcement agencies work in relative isolation, while being up against criminal groups with sophisticated transnational networks.

== Key participants ==
It is likely that anyone who participates in large-scale maritime drug smuggling into Australia is, or is linked to, a criminal organisation, but the degree to which this might happen can vary. Participants may be directly part of crime groups such as Asian drug gangs, Mexican cartels, or Australian outlaw biker groups, or smaller groups or even individuals operating in rings.

Some have argued that the post-9/11 preoccupation of terrorism has led to gaps in investigation and intelligence to combat the modern, ever-sophisticated transnational criminal networks. Such networks include not only the previously mentioned partnerships between Mexican cartels and Australia-based criminal groups, but also for example partnerships between Mexican cartels and Chinese organised crime groups. In order to improve their resilience, these cartels have also become organisations dealing with many kinds of drugs, as well as other activities such as people smuggling and extortion.

A variety of push and pull factors can help to explain the presence of Mexican cartels in Australia, with the lower demand for cocaine coupled with higher profitability seen in operating in Australia or Europe leading to these cartels to branch out away from only Mexico, with Australia having some of the world’s highest prices for drugs in the world, while still having a large demand from drug users.

Chinese crime groups are also active in contributing to maritime methamphetamine trafficking to Australia, and are also collaborating with Australian outlaw motorcycle gangs, with a significant percentage of methamphetamine seized at the border coming from China.

== Key responses ==
Australia has responded through law enforcement, naval forces, and policy in order to attempt to combat the issue of maritime drug smuggling into Australia, with many transnational cooperation initiatives and joint organisational busts.

The Australian Navy seeks to control maritime crime as a priority, both on its own and with transnational partnerships and groupings also. This includes counter-narcotics operations. Some notable operations include the now decommissioned warship HMAS Darwin being part of Operation Slipper, which was the Australian Defence Force’s contribution to an international campaign against drug trafficking, piracy and terrorism in the Indian Ocean. This served as a deterrent and monitoring capability, but has also yielded tangible results as seen in the 2014 seizure of the record heroin haul at sea (over 1 tonne) together with the Royal Navy. HMAS Arunta is also deployed to the East Coast of Africa in order to disrupt the flow of drug money to terrorist organisations as part of a larger international effort against terrorism. The United Nations estimates that over half of the Taliban's income stems from the narcotics trade. The federal police have also of course been a key role in responses to maritime drug trafficking to Australia, with it playing a key role in many busts, including the cocaine busts in the South Pacific crackdown.

Policy responses include attempting to lessen the ice (methamphetamine) issue in Australia through the National Ice Taskforce’s nation-wide strategy and the July 2016 commitment from the Australian government to spend nearly A$300 million in the next 4 years in educational, preventative, treatment, community engagement initiatives in order to combat methamphetamine. The 2018 A$293 million allocation in the budget to improve airport security and cargo screening is also a response and potential deterrent to would-be drug traffickers targeting Australia. However, it is important to mention that as of 2016, Australia does not have a clear strategy with which to engage with Association of Southeast Asian Nations's law enforcement agencies to tackle the shared transnational problem of narcotics smuggling, which can be seen as an area of necessary improvement and increased importance going forward.

There is also the opportunity for Australian authorities to try to tackle maritime drug smuggling by employing resources typically used for other means, by essentially expanding the duties of certain initiatives or organisations. This may be a theme of increasing prevalence in the South Pacific due to aforementioned lack of capabilities. One such example of this is the Forum Fisheries Agency (FFA) based in Honiara, of which Australia is a member. The FFA surveillance centre monitors up to 30 million square kilometres of ocean, encompassing the exclusive economic zones (EEZs) of 15 island nations not including Australia and New Zealand. While this is done to monitor tuna fishing vessels in order to protect tuna fishing license income, its operations can expand to monitor drug smuggling and other similar issues such as people smuggling with a marginal cost increase.

== See also ==
- Maritime security
- Crime in Australia
