= Uniting Medically Supervised Injecting Centre =

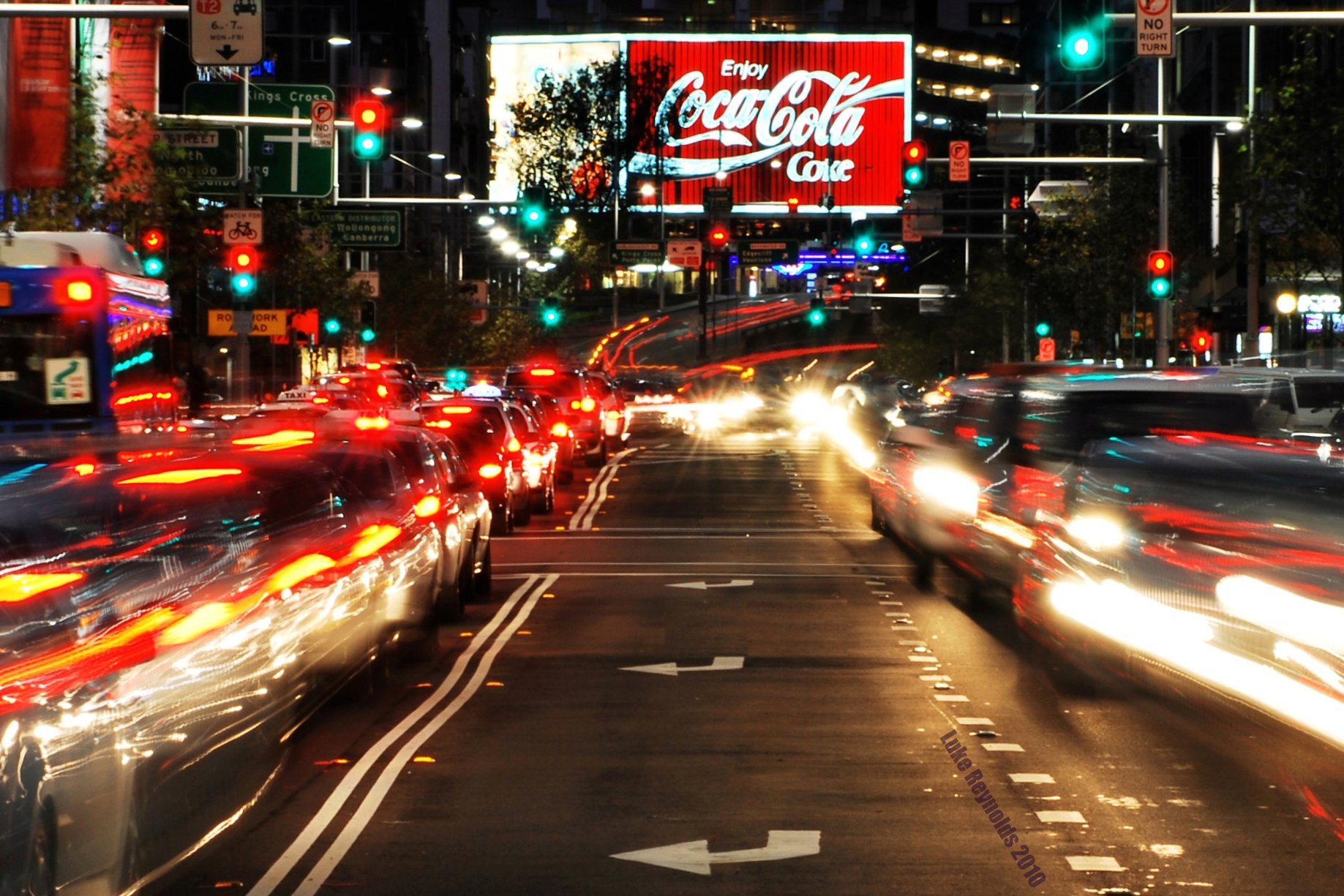
- Kings Cross is an inner city suburb to the east of the Sydney CBD.

Geography
- Location: Kings Cross, New South Wales, Australia

Organisation
- Religious affiliation: Uniting Church of Australia
- Network: Uniting Care

History
- Founded: 6 May 2001

The Uniting Medically Supervised Injecting Centre Kings Cross (also known as Uniting MSIC or Sydney Medically Supervised Injecting Centre) is a state government-supported facility in Kings Cross, New South Wales that provides safe injecting rooms, sterile equipment and medical supervision for individuals who wish to administer an illicit drug intravenously.

The centre, which opened in May 2001, was the first legal injecting site in Australia with the primary purpose of preventing the risk of injuries and death resulting from unsafe and unhygienic injecting practices.

As one of the first medically supervised injecting centres in the world, Uniting MSIC has received global attention for its successful reduction in drug-related emergencies.

As of 2016, the centre had successfully supervised over one million injections with no fatalities.

== History ==
From the 1970s, Sydney saw a rapid growth in the availability and consumption of heroin. At the heart of the illegal drug trade scene was the inner-city suburb of Kings Cross, which was heavily affected by homelessness and the sex industry.

Throughout the 1990s, King Cross became home to an increasing amount of illegally operated shooting galleries leased by sex trade businesses. For a small fee, these 24-hour rooms provided the timed use of a space for drug users to consume drugs safely, away from the threat of police detection or other drug users and with the security of clean equipment and on-site employees who could intervene in the case of an overdose.

The 1997 Wood Royal Commission into police corruption in New South Wales led to a large majority of shooting galleries being closed down, having previously been operating under the blind-eye of local authorities. Despite this, the uncovering of these shooting galleries gave rise to a new interest in the value of supervised injecting sites for the management of public health and order.

After a long period of public and parliamentary debate between the years of 1996 and 1999, the NSW State Parliament passed legislation permitting the 18-month trial of a supervised injecting centre in 1999. Originally secured by the Sisters of Charity Health Service, who withdrew their proposal due to disapproval from the Vatican, the Government of New South Wales invited the Uniting Church of Australia to oversee the operation of such facility. With the highest number of drug overdoses in Australia and a majority support of residents and local government in favour of the establishment of a supervised injecting centre, the NSW Government recommended Kings Cross as the location for the trial centre.

On 6 May 2001, the Uniting Medically Supervised Injecting Centre was opened at 66 Darlinghurst Road, Kings Cross. The site was chosen for its close vicinity popular points of sale and use of drugs in the Kings Cross area, as well as its distance from shops, clubs and pubs that could be negatively impacted by the location of the centre.

The Uniting Medically Supervised Injecting Centre is permitted to operate under amendments made to Part 2A of the NSW Drug Misuse and Trafficking Act 1985 (NSW). Part 2A includes requirements stipulating the necessary level of supervision, conditions of license and the medical training of staff, as well as enforcing exemptions from criminal liability for users of the centre and police discretion not to charge users for possession when travelling to or from the centre. Any contravention of the act by the centre may result in the suspension or revocation of their license to legally operate in New South Wales.

The trial period of the injecting facility was extended three times in 2002, 2003 and 2007. Following clear longitudinal evidence of positive results from independent evaluation bodies such as KPMG, the NSW Parliament voted in favour of overturning the trial status of the Uniting Medically Supervised Injecting Centre. Legislation was passed on 1 November 2010 to officially permit the permanent legal licence for the operation of the centre.

== Services ==
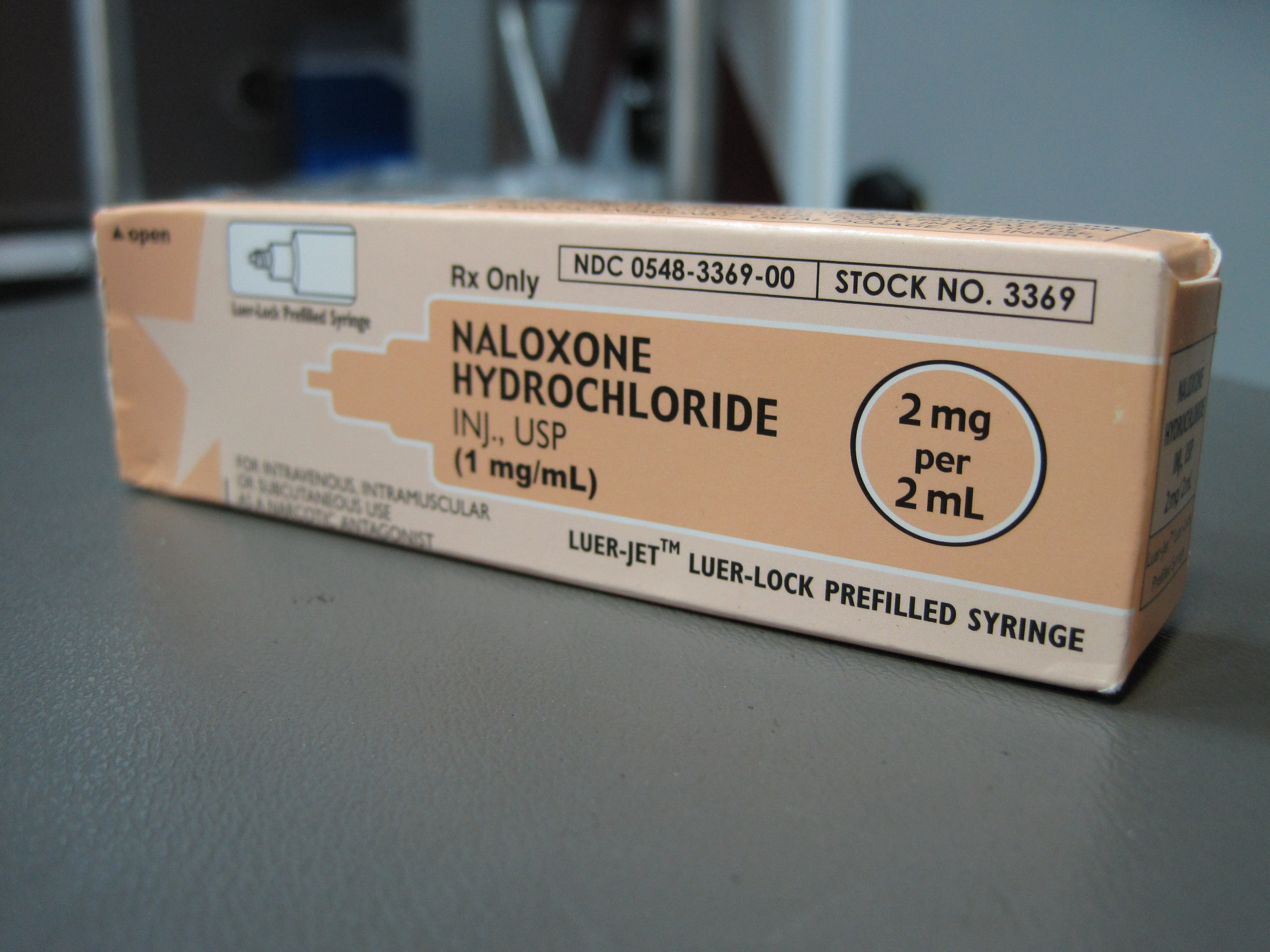
Naloxone is a commonly administered drug used at injecting centres to counteract drug overdoses.

The Uniting Medically Supervised Injecting Centre offers supervision for a number of drugs including heroin, cocaine, methamphetamines and prescription pain medications such as oxycodone and morphine.

The Uniting Medically Supervised Injecting Centre is supervised by a medical director who must be qualified as a licensed doctor. At all hours of operation, four registered nurses and four counsellors are on duty, as well as one registered mental health nurse. The centre is also staffed with security guards at all times to ensure the safety of users in and around the centre as well as prevent drug dealing activity and conflict.

Clients move through three separated areas when visiting the centre; the waiting room and assessment area, the injecting room and the after care area. Staff first register the patient to understand their health history, what drugs they intend on consuming and to offer counsel on the risks of injecting. Once this is completed, clients proceed to injecting booths where they are provided with clean equipment and water to inject with. In cases where overdose occurs, staff in the injecting room are trained to use oxygen masks and administer naloxone to respond to the overdose. Once a client has safely intravenously consumed the drug, they proceed to the after care room where they can stay with the support of staff until they feel ready to return to the public through the back exit.

The centre provides a number of related medical services such as basic medical assessments and vein care. Health promotion in the form of both casual verbal exchanges and counselling forms a key part of the day-to-day operation of the centre and involves education around safe injecting techniques, sexual health, nutrition and liver health. On occasion, these will lead to staff issuing referrals to further services which include but are not limited to drug treatment programs, social services, housing support, mental health support, hospitals and legal centres.

Since the centre's trial status was overturned, many new services have continued to be added. In 2012, the centre began employing mental health nurses who could assist clients suffering from a broad range of mental health disorders. The centre has also become a leading facility for research and medical trials directed specifically at drug users. In recent years, the centre has also begun to provide general training on harm reduction and overdose response to health professionals, students and local small businesses interested on educating themselves on how to minimise risks for themselves and others.

== Client characteristics ==
The criteria for clients is relatively broad to encourage access to all drug users who require supervision and assistance. To be eligible, clients must be

- 18 years or older
- Have injected drugs before
- Not be accompanied by a child
- Not be already intoxicated

Of the registered clients of the Uniting Medically Supervised Injecting Centre, 74% are male with the average age being 32 years. 39% of clients were daily drug users while 22% were weekly users and 35% were less than weekly users. The average age that clients started consuming drugs was 18 years old, with the average length of drug use being 13 years.

39% had a history of drug overdose and 10% had a history of injecting-related injuries or diseases. 6% had shared a needle in the last month.

Under half of clients (46%) had not completed high school and for 61%, welfare payments are their main source of income. 21% were full time workers and 8% of clients had worked in sex work in the past month.

31% of clients are homeless, while 23% live locally in the 2010 postcode.

== Funding and costs ==
The Uniting Medically Supervised Injecting Centre is funded by the Confiscated Proceeds of Crime Account which is issued to the centre by the New South Wales Treasury.

The initial set up costs for the Uniting Medically Supervised Injecting Centre was $1.3 million Australian dollars. The annual cost of operation stands around $2.5 million Australian dollars, with costs increasing with inflation and an increasing number of services and staff provided by the centre.

The average cost per client per visit to the Sydney MSIC is $34.14 and has remained relatively stable since the centre first opened.

In comparison to economic assessments of a comparably sized supervised injecting facility in Vancouver, "Insite," the Sydney Medically Supervised Injecting Centre provides the same range and quality of services at a significantly smaller budget.

== Criticisms ==
The media response to the Uniting Medically Supervised Injecting Centre was initially varied and sensational. One early newspaper article received particularly widespread attention when it alleged that syringes from the centre were being negligently disposed in public bins at the rear of the facility. It was later discovered that the syringes in fact belonged to neighbouring property’s diabetic cat, which was only later corrected.

The public perception was at first suspicious of the new facility, with many concerned by the fact that the centre was a drain on public resources and would attract, and retain, a community of drug users in the suburb.

While independent studies have shown that the centre continues to benefit drug users and the local community, the centre has been regularly criticised by media outlets and politicians which resulted in the prolonged period for which the centre retained a trial status.

The organisation Drug Free Australia has been a leading dissenter of the Uniting MSIC, regularly publishing criticisms of the centre. Drug Free Australia has continued to assert that the centre encourages drug users to experiment with higher doses of drugs than they would usually consume, thereby placing drug users at a higher risk. They argue that the centre is underused and ineffective, claiming that many clients continue to inject outside of the centre and that the client characteristics represent drug users who are less likely to overdose than other groups of intravenous drug users in Sydney.

== Effectiveness ==
In a study by the National Centre in HIV Epidemiology and Clinical Research, 49% of users stated they would have injected in public had they not used the injecting centre. Against the current numbers at the time of the study, this revealed over 191 673 events of public drug consumption that had been successfully prevented.

There has been a positive response in clients' willingness to rehabilitative treatments with 16% of all clients receiving referrals on average per year. For 70% of clients, the Uniting MSIC is the first health service they have ever accessed.

Between 2001 and 2016, the centre had supervised over one million injections with no recorded fatalities and intervention only being required in less than 10% of interactions. The centre has contributed to a significant relief on local emergency services with early studies showing an 80% reduction in ambulance call-outs to the Kings Cross area.

Contrary to public concerns, the number of new diagnoses of blood borne viruses such as HIV, HBV and HCV have not shown any marked increase and remained stable, consistent with the greater Sydney region.

Frequently updated research on crime in the area has continued to show no correlation between crime and the establishment of the injecting centre. In the first 6 years of operation, monthly publicly disposed needle and syringe counts revealed a 50% decrease in the Kings Cross area. Theft, robbery, loitering and drug use and supply offences have seen no marked increase or decrease that can be attributed to the centre.

The local community continues to support the Uniting Medically Supervised Injecting Centre with 73% of residents and business owners supporting the continued operation of the centre. In a 2005 study, a significant decrease was noted in both residents and business owners who had witnessed a public injecting within the last year.

== See also ==
- Australian Injecting and Illicit Drug Users League
- Illicit drug use in Australia
- Supervised injection site
