= Illicit drug use in Australia =

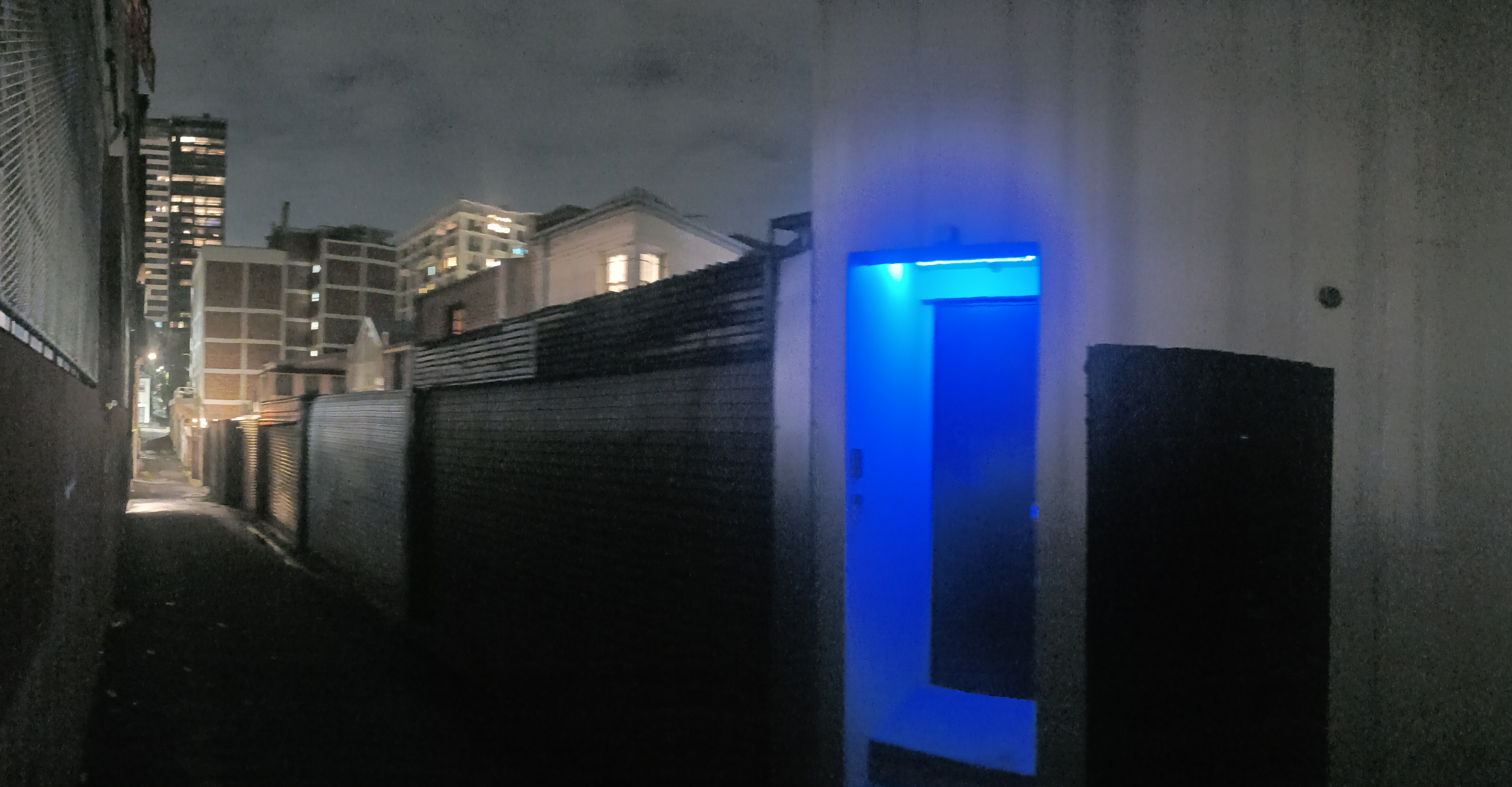
A laneway in Darlinghurst, Sydney with a blue light to prevent intravenous drug use. 2026.

Illicit drug use in Australia is the recreational use of prohibited drugs in Australia. Illicit drugs include illegal drugs (such as cannabis, opiates, and certain types of stimulants), pharmaceutical drugs (such as pain-killers and tranquillisers) when used for non-medical purposes, and other substances used inappropriately (such as inhalants). According to government and community organisations, the use and abuse, and the illegality, of illicit drugs is a social, health and legal issue that creates an annual illegal market estimated to be worth A$6.7 billion. Estimates made in 2022 place the figure at A$11.3 billion per year.

In Australia, many drugs are regulated by the federal Standard for the Uniform Scheduling of Medicines and Poisons, as well as various state and territory laws. This includes many prescription-only drugs which are considered "illicit drugs" if the holder does not have a prescription or other authority to possess them. However alcoholic beverages, tobacco and caffeine are not covered by this law.

== Drug use in Australia ==
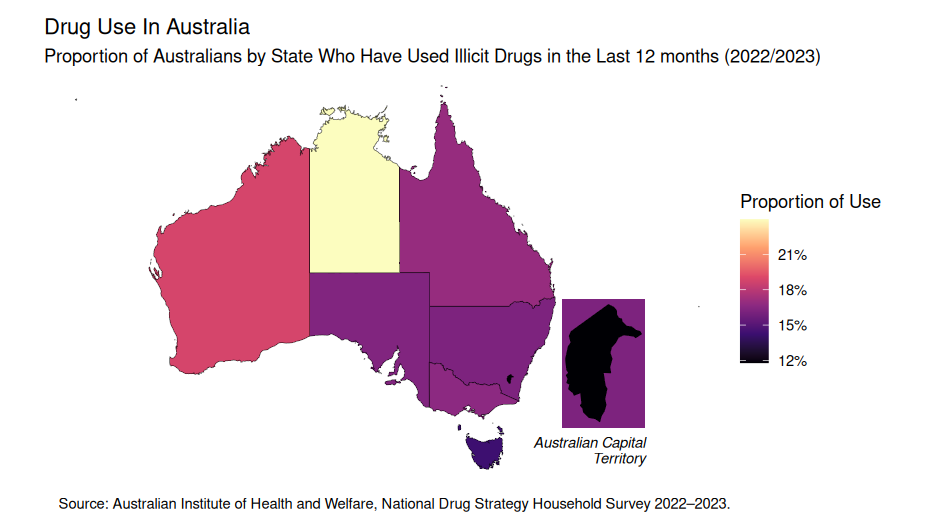
Proportion of Australians by state who reported to have used illicit drugs in the last 12 months (2022/2023)

=== History ===
Prior to Australian Federation, there was little policy response to the use of illicit substances. Opium was mostly regulated via colonial trade laws, with most government interventions taking the form of warning labels, designed to prevent death through overdose. According to the Victorian Premier's Drug Advisory Council in 1899, there were three main "classes" of opium users. The first class of opium users were middle-class, middle-aged women who took the drug for menstrual pain or to alleviate the symptoms of depression. The second class of opium users included doctors, nurses and other health professionals, who used the drug as a strategy for coping with the stress of their work. The third class were Chinese immigrants, amongst whom the drug was primarily used as a recreational substance.

Many of the initial attempts to control opium were motivated by racism, with Anglo-Celtic Australians citing opium use by Chinese Australians as a danger to health and morality. As Australia approached Federation, an increasing number of bills were passed in state parliaments to restrict the use of opium. By 1905, there were many laws in place which prohibited the import and use of smoking grade opium; however, by the 1930s, Australia had the developed world's highest per capita rate of heroin consumption.

With the introduction of laws and policies which prohibited the import and use of opium, taxation income the government had previously been earning from opium imports was redundant. A customs report in 1908 noted that "it is very doubtful if such a prohibition has lessened to any great extent the amount bought into Australia."

Desmond Manderson, an expert on the history of Australian drug policy, has asserted that from this time forward, Australia's drug policies have been more dictated by international relations and a political need for moral panic than any concern for health and welfare (Manderson, 1993).

Following World War I, the Hague Conference and The Treaty of Versailles began to set international agreements on drug laws (Berridge, 1999). Britain signed the treaties on behalf of Australia, and from this point on, Australia's State and Territory governments have created their own laws and policies relating to illicit drug use. In the 1920s and 1930s, there was an increasingly internationalist approach to drug policy, overseen by the League of Nations, with Australia enacting a series of increasingly strict drug laws (Mandelson, 1987), despite the low incidence of illicit drug use in Australia during this period. Although Australia was initially influenced by the strict illicit drug controls and penalties promoted by the League of Nations, and subsequently the United Nations; following the end of the World War 2, Australia's illicit drug policies became increasingly influenced by the United States, due to the United States' increasingly pro-active participation in United Nations policy making and large financial contribution to United Nations budgets. Hence, the strong British influence on Australia's drug policies waned, and Australia's illicit drug policies shifted from a health and social focus to an increased focus on law enforcement and criminal justice.

Illicit drug use in Australia was popularised in Australia in the 1960s. The shifting of social and cultural norms in the 1960s counterculture, which explicitly involved a sense of revolution, created a youth culture which was enthusiastic about exploring altered states of consciousness and were keen to experiment with drugs. In 1960's Sydney, the most high-profile use of illicit drugs was focused around the Kings Cross area, whose reputation as a "red light district" attracted members of various international armed forces on leave from the Indochina Wars.

American troops stationed in major Australian cities such as Sydney provided access to drugs like heroin. Heroin became immensely popular during the Vietnam War-era, and was smuggled into the country from South East Asia through crime syndicates in collaboration with members of the Nugan Hand Bank and the C.I.A. Subsequently, drug use increased in the 1960s and 1970s, as did laws prohibiting illicit drug use and police powers. Since this period, Kings Cross has retained its reputation for vice and has remained a popular destination for tourists. Drug literature, later defined as a part of the grunge lit canon, shone a light on drug taking in Australian's urban areas: Monkey Grip (1977) by Helen Garner charts the fraught relationship between a single-mother in her thirties, and a twenty-something heroin addict living in Fitzroy in Melbourne, while Candy: A Novel of Love and Addiction (1998) Luke Davies details a young couple addicted to heroin in 1980s Sydney.

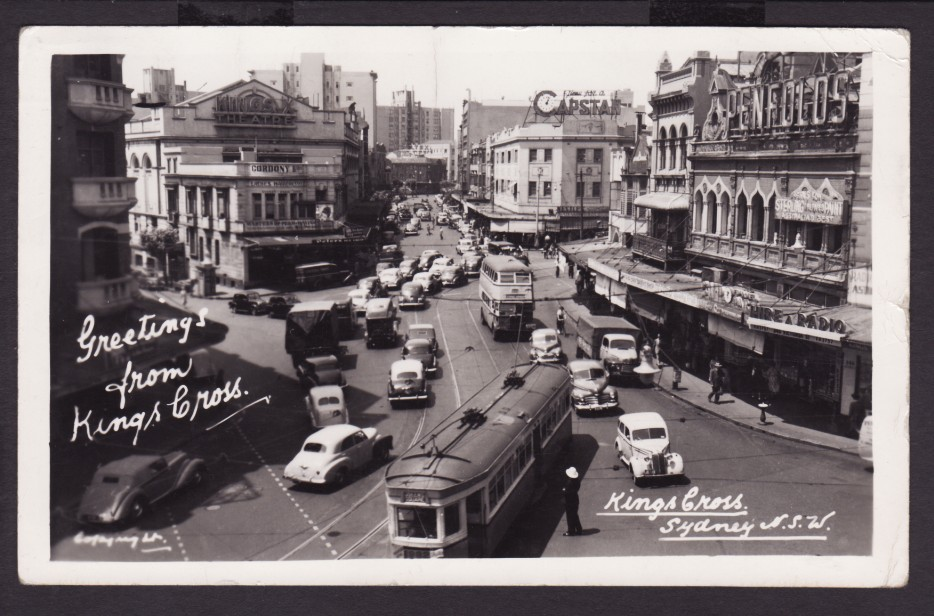
The Kings Cross area of Sydney in 1950.

Prior to this time, drugs had been synonymous with Kings Cross and the neighboring suburb of Darlinghurst. In the 1920s and 1930s, local Razor Gangs achieved such a level of notoriety through their violent attempts to control the local cocaine trade, that Darlinghurst became colloquially known as "Razorhurst". In 1932, Phil Jeffs established one of the area's most notorious nightclubs, the Fifty-Fifty club, in which gambling, sex work, "sly-grog" (illicit alcohol) and cocaine were freely available. Jeffs avoided police attention by bribing high-profile police officers to refrain from raiding the club.

Drug use increased exponentially by the mid-1980s. With the emergence of HIV/AIDS, transmission of the virus was identified as a serious public health risk for injecting drug users and media attention focusing on illicit drug use increased dramatically. A series of public health campaigns, known as the "Grim Reaper campaign" were televised in 1987, designed to increase awareness of the risk of transmission of virus; however, due to the "shock tactics" used in the advertisements, the campaign was criticised as further marginalizing groups at high risk of HIV/AIDS. In 1985, Australia's Prime Minister, Bob Hawke, revealed in a nationally televised interview that his daughter, Rosslyn, was a heroin user. Following Hawke's admission, a new drug initiative, the National Campaign Against Drug Abuse (NCADA), was launched. Roundtable discussions instigated by the National Campaign Against Drug Abuse produced a National Drug Strategy that has continued to provide a foundation for Australia's illicit drug policy approach.

Australia's first National Drug Strategy (1985), focused on demand reduction, supply reduction and harm reduction. However, studies have identified that this policy, which continues today, has failed as government funds are primarily focused on law enforcement, rather than prevention and treatment.

The death of Sydney teenager Anna Wood from ecstasy in 1995 prompted strong media coverage and moral outrage over concerns relating to teenage drug use in Australia and attacks on rave dance parties, where Wood consumed the drug and later became ill. Wood's parents later vehemently campaigned the "Just Say No" policy across the country to prevent the tragedy from re-occurring. However, despite state and federal governments investing millions of dollars in anti-drug campaigns, ecstasy use has increased amongst Australians, including young people.

Drug use by the age group 15 years to 20 years old has been classified as an issue that requires intervention. Medical and public health professionals have attempted to deal with the issue with the same approach that was made through trying to decrease drunk driving rates. The approach places more emphasis on the fact that someone has lower self-esteem and struggles socially and how that affects their decision-making within the prevalence of substance use. David Moore proposed that drug use within group settings offers many benefits and that drug use is shared amongst various human societies. Psychologists have become more open to the notion of "social context" when using their models on substance abuse. Moore considers social context to be based on the circumstance of use and how the cultural beliefs and social aspect illuminates and brings meaning to the circumstance of use. Because drug use is social, adequate methodologies for defining the social features of usage are crucial. A significant flaw in studies on the use of drugs among youth is the failure to interpret the social context in which drug use happens adequately. The blurring of lines between problematic use and any use of drugs due to the reliance on amount/prevalence measures, the equating of all illicit drug use with abuse, and, perhaps, ignorance of the social aspect of use, which provides alternative criteria for the definitions of problematic use as well as a means of trying to understand the symbolic aspects of use.

=== 21st century ===
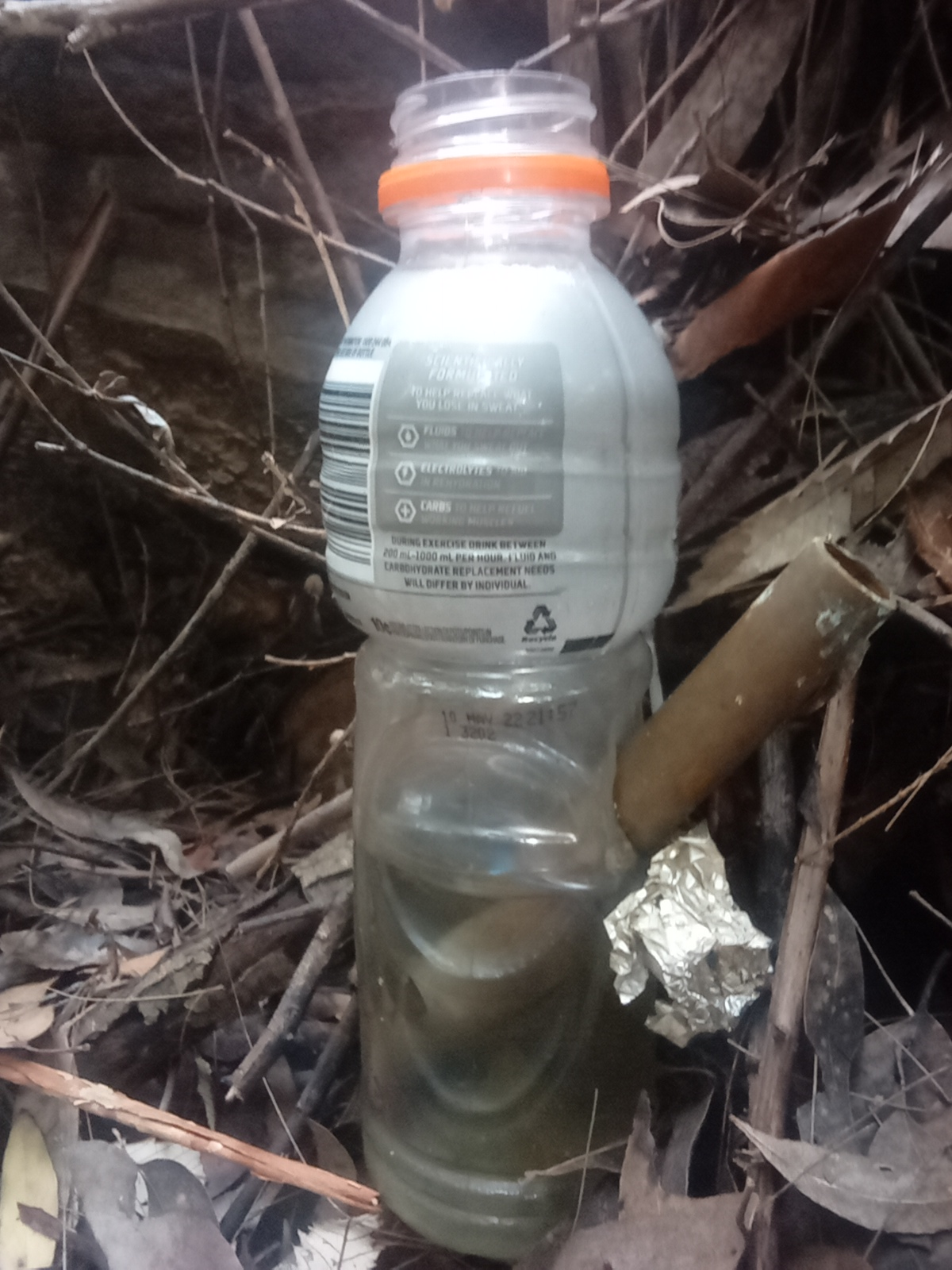

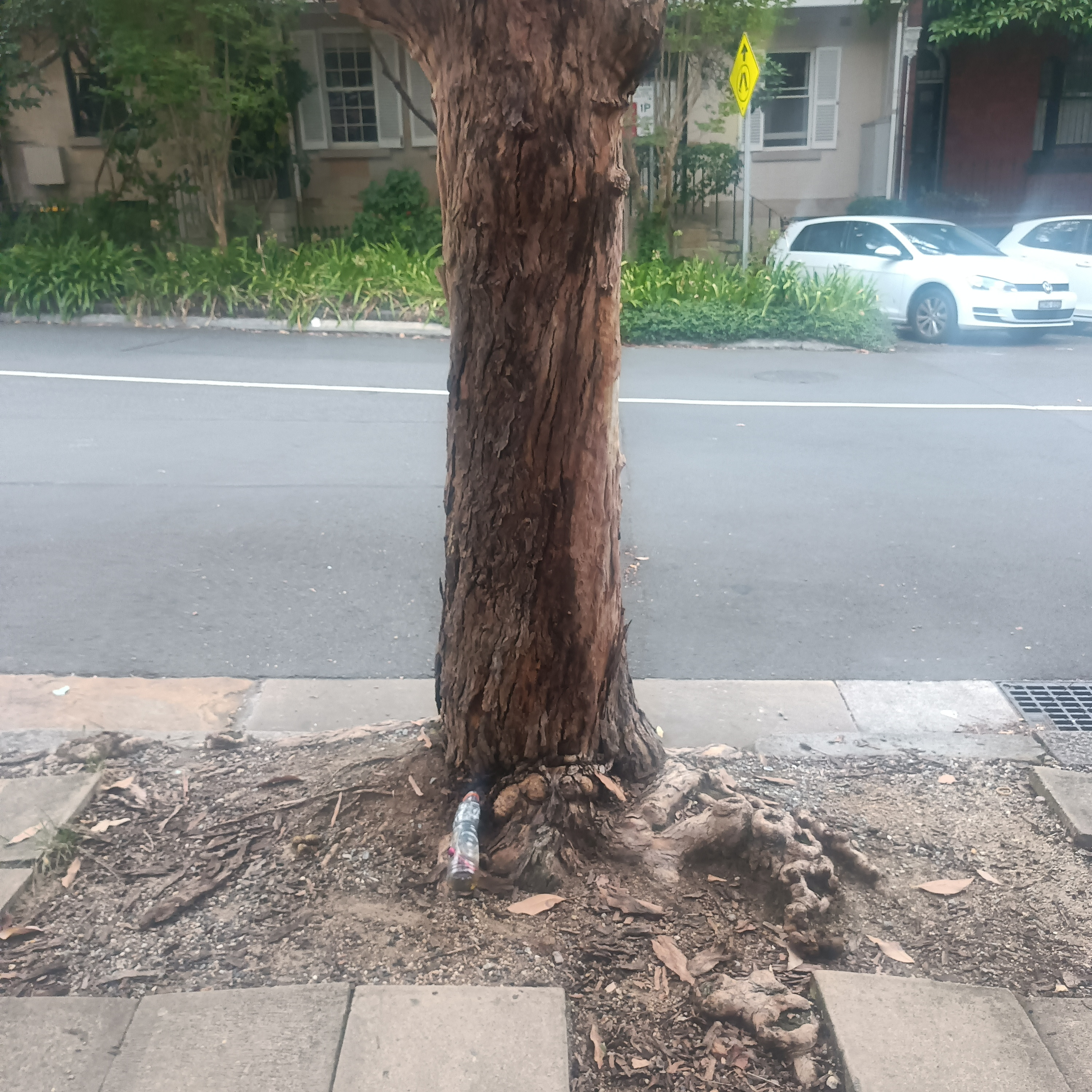
Bongs made from a Gatorade plastic drink bottle. Sydney, Top; Asquith 2022 Bottom; Darlinghurst 2026

During the 1990s, Australia experienced a heroin "epidemic", in which high quality, low priced heroin, imported from South East Asia, was readily available in many metropolitan, suburban and rural areas. However, since 2001, Australia has been experiencing what is being referred to as a "heroin drought", with high grade heroin being much more difficult to access.

As a result of this, many other illicit drugs have risen and fallen in popularity to fill this void, with prescription temazepam, morphine, oxycodone, methamphetamine and cocaine all being used as a substitute. 2008 has seen a reversal of this trend, with the arrival of Afghan heroin being seen in Sydney for the first time ever. Although anecdotal evidence from illicit drug users reject the claim, some researchers assert that the potency of heroin has since been on the rise, and is nearly comparable to the purity of heroin prior to 2000.

In 2001, the Sydney Medically Supervised Injecting Centre opened in Kings Cross. It was opened on the recommendation of the Wood Royal Commission. Prior to this, several venues such as strip clubs or brothels in Kings Cross rented out rooms to injecting drug users so that they could have a private and safe place to inject. This practice went on with unofficial approval by the police, as it kept injecting drug use off the streets and in the one area. This further allowed criminal activity to profit off illicit drug use, as many venue owners would sell rooms and drugs. The Wood Royal Commission identified that while there were benefits to these illegal shooting galleries, allowing police to cooperate with illegal activities could encourage corruption, it suggested an independent medical facility to continue providing safety for the users, and safety for the public by lessening the impact of drug use on the streets, such as discarded needles or drug related deaths.

The Australian Crime Commission's illicit drug data report for 2011–2012 was released in western Sydney on 20 May 2013 and revealed that the seizures of illegal substances during the reporting period were the largest in a decade due to record interceptions of amphetamines, cocaine and steroids. The report also stated that average strength of crystal methamphetamine doubled in most jurisdictions within a 12-month period and the majority of laboratory closures involved small "addict-based" operations.

The Melbourne inner-city suburbs of Richmond and Abbotsford are locations in which the use and dealing of heroin has been concentrated for a protracted time period. Research organisation the Burnet Institute completed the 2013 'North Richmond Public Injecting Impact Study' in collaboration with the Yarra Drug and Health Forum, City of Yarra and North Richmond Community Health Centre and recommended 24-hour access to sterile injecting equipment due to the ongoing "widespread, frequent and highly visible" nature of illicit drug use in the areas. During the period between 2010 and 2012 a four-fold increase in the levels of needles and syringes collected from disposal units and street-sweep operations was documented for the two suburbs. In the local government area the City of Yarra, of which Richmond and Abbotsford are parts, 1550 syringes were collected each month from public syringe disposal bins in 2012. Furthermore, ambulance callouts for heroin overdoses were 1.5 times higher than for other Melbourne areas in the period between 2011 and 2012 (a total of 336 overdoses), and drug-related arrests in North Richmond were also three times higher than the state average. The Burnet Institute's researchers interviewed health workers, residents and local traders, in addition to observing the drug scene in the most frequented North Richmond public injecting locations.

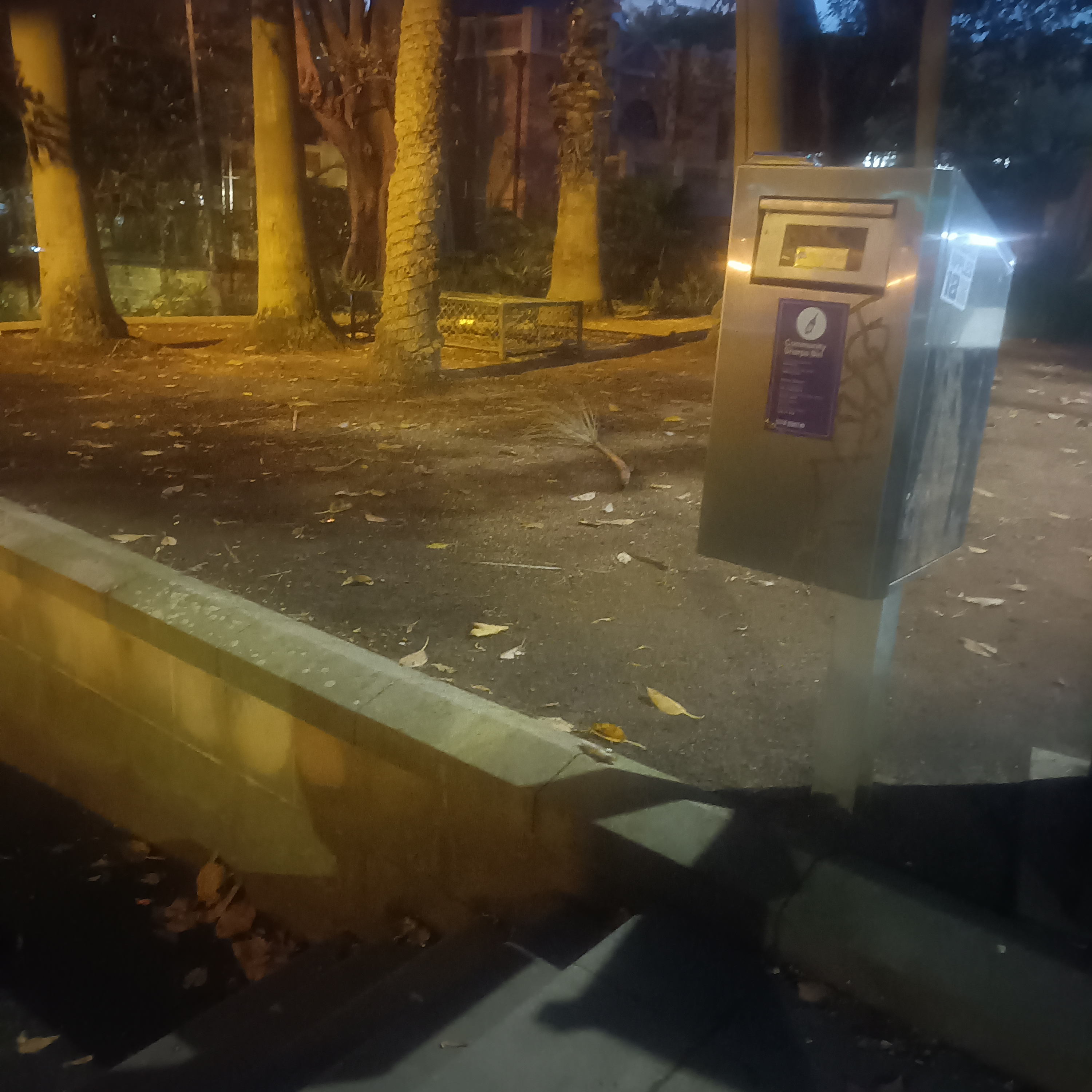

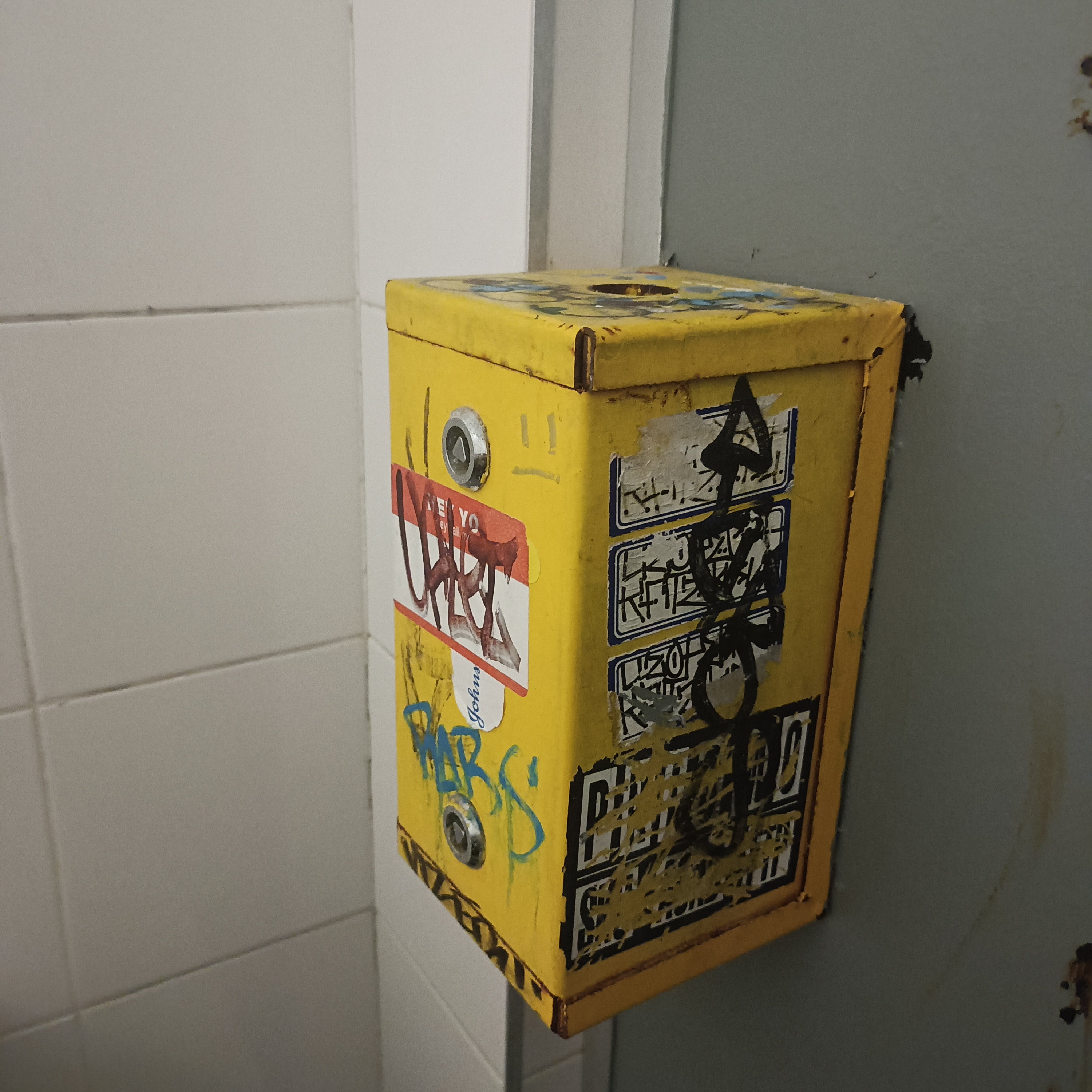
Top; A community sharps bin in Darlinghurst, Sydney. Bottom; A sharps bin in a public toilet in Randwick, Sydney. 2026

On 28 May 2013, the Burnet Institute stated in the media that it recommends 24-hour access to sterile injecting equipment in the Melbourne suburb of Footscray after the area's drug culture continues to grow after more than ten years of intense law enforcement efforts. The institute's research concluded that public injecting behaviour is frequent in the area and inappropriately discarding injecting paraphernalia has been found in carparks, parks, footpaths and drives. Furthermore, people who inject drugs have broken open syringe disposal bins to reuse discarded injecting equipment.

A study (part of the Global Burden of Disease Study 2010 published in The Lancet), led by Professor Louisa Degenhardt from the National Drug and Alcohol Research Centre, reported in late August 2013 that Australia has one of the world's most serious drug problems, caused by amphetamines, cocaine, cannabis and opioids. Co-author Professor Harvey Whiteford, from the University of Queensland, stated: "There is no doubt Australia has a culture, especially among our young people, which does not see the taking of illicit substances or binge drinking as particularly detrimental to the health. Our study suggests otherwise."

In mid-September 2013, research by the Australian Bureau of Statistics valued the contribution of the illicit drugs market to the Australian economy at A$6 billion, while tax avoidance is responsible for an additional A$20 billion. The same research also recorded a fall of 19 per cent between 2008 and 2013 due to a reduction in the sales of heroin and cannabis.

An Australian study released on 16 September 2013 showed that ambulance callouts for methamphetamine and amphetamine-related issues rose from 445 to 880 cases in Melbourne, the capital city of Victoria—this rise is attributed mainly to crystal methamphetamine, as attendance figures rose from 136 to 592 cases. The list of reasons for the callouts included anxiety, paranoia, palpitations, gastrointestinal symptoms, and self-harm.

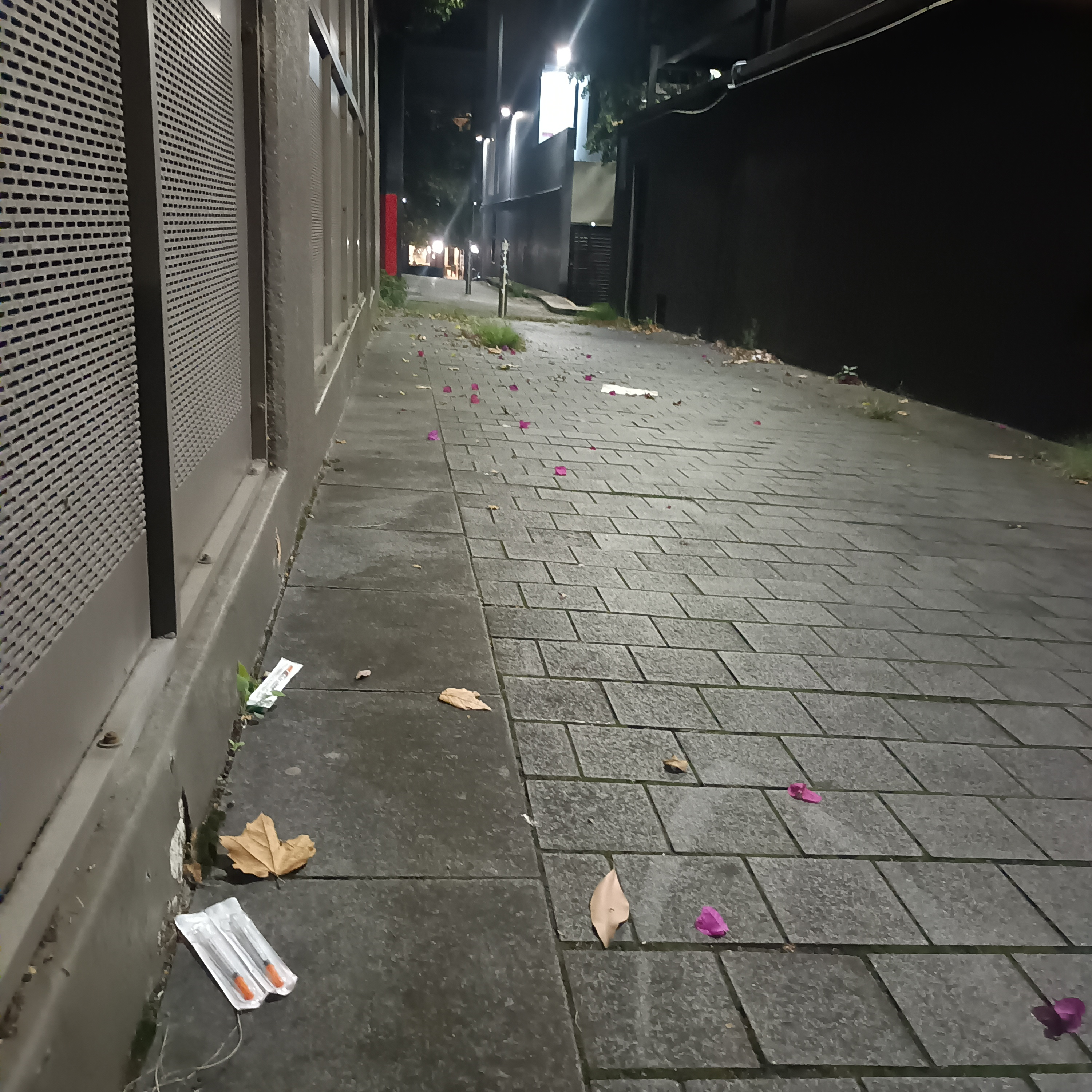
Hypodermic syringes in a laneway in Darlinghurst, Sydney. 2026

Figures obtained by the Australian Bureau of Statistics (ABS) on drug overdose were released in August 2014. The data revealed that the 1,427 overdose deaths recorded nationally in 2012 by the ABS outnumbered the road toll for the second year in a row, as well as a 65-per cent increase in accidental overdose deaths among females over the previous decade. Many of the recorded deaths were the result of prescription drug use.

The 2016 national drug strategy household survey showed that at least 34.8% of all Australians aged 12 years and over had used cannabis at least once in their lifetime, compared to 86.2% of Australians aged 12 years and over having consumed alcohol at least once in their lifetime. It also found that in the 12 months prior to the survey being taken at least 10.4% of all Australians had smoked cannabis at least once.

=== 2012 United Nations World Drug Report ===
The 2012 United Nations World Drug Report published data that indicated that Australia has one of the highest global prevalence of cannabis use. The report also stated that cocaine use had increased over the four years leading up to 2012. The use of 3,4-methylenedioxy-N-methylamphetamine (MDMA), more commonly known as "Ecstasy", declined from 3.7 per cent to 3.0 percent between 2007 and 2010; however, the highest number of manufacturing laboratory interceptions occurred in Australia during this period.

=== Policy response ===
The Australian government enacted numerous policies in response to illicit drug use. During the 1980s, it was one of the first countries to enact the policy of "harm minimisation", which consists of three pillars: "demand reduction", "supply reduction" and "harm reduction". This policy is still in effect as of 2012 and the following outlines are contained in The National Drug Strategy: Australia's integrated framework document:

- Supply reduction strategies to disrupt the production and supply of illicit drugs, and the control and regulation of licit substances. It involves border security, Customs and prosecuting people involved in the trafficking of illicit substances.
- Demand reduction strategies to prevent the uptake of harmful drug use, including abstinence orientated strategies and treatment to reduce drug use; This involves programs promoting abstinence or treating existing users.
- Harm reduction strategies to reduce drug-related harm to individuals and communities. It is a policy that is a "safety net" to the preceding two policies. The threefold model accepts that demand prevention and supply prevention will never be completely effective, and if people are involved in risky activities, the damage they cause to themselves and society at large should be minimised. It involves programs like needle and syringe programs and safe injecting sites, which aim to prevent the spread of disease or deaths from overdoses, while providing users with support to reduce or stop using drugs.

In 2007 Bronwyn Bishop headed a federal parliamentary committee reported that the Government's harm reduction policy is not effective enough. It recommended re-evaluating harm reduction and a zero-tolerance approach for drug education in schools. The committee also wanted the law changed so children can be put into mandatory care if parents were found to be using drugs. It suggested "establish[ing] adoption as the 'default' care option for children aged 0–5 years where the child protection notification involved illicit drug use by the parent/s". The report says federal, state and territory governments should only fund treatment services that are trying to make people permanently drug-free and priority should go to those that are more successful.

The report was criticised by a range of organisations such as Family Drug Support, the Australian Democrats and the Australian Drug Foundation for lacking evidence, being ideologically driven and having the potential to do harm to Australia. The Labor Party authors also released a dissenting report. The report and its recommendations have been shelved since the election of the Rudd Government in 2007 (Rudd was prime minister until 2010).

A report authored by Professor Alison Ritter, the director of the drug policy modelling program at the University of NSW (UNSW), was released in June 2013 calculated that the Australian Government continues to spend A$1.7 billion on its annual illicit drug response. Entitled "Government Drug Policy Expenditure in Australia", the report also concluded that the harm reduction arm of the government's policy, with 2.1 per cent of the drugs budget, or A$36 million, devoted to harm reduction in the 2009–10 financial year. During the same time period, A$361 million, or 21 per cent, was directed towards treatment and A$1.1 billion was expended on law enforcement. The report identifies a significant decrease in the proportion of funds allocated to harm reduction over time and Ritter expressed her concern in an interview with the Sydney Morning Herald newspaper:

It's a shift in policy that hasn't been formally acknowledged. There is absolutely no reason that investment should have decreased. We don't have good evidence that law enforcement works, and we have anecdotal evidence I suppose that it might not work as a policy. We continue to arrest people and drugs keep coming into Australia … and profits continue to be made.

In 2015 the Legislative Council of Victoria instructed the Law Reform, Road and Community Safety Committee to inquire into, consider and report, on the effectiveness of laws, procedures and regulations relating to illicit and synthetic drugs and the misuse of prescription medication in minimising drug‑related health, social and economic harm; and the practice of other Australian states and territories and overseas jurisdictions and their approach to drug law reform and how other positive reforms could be adopted into Victorian law. Throughout the inquiry, the committee received 231 submissions from a diverse range of experts and stakeholders working in various areas of drug policy and law reform, in addition to individual members of the community. The Committee held nine days of public hearings and two site visits in Melbourne and Sydney from June to November 2017. In addition, the Committee travelled to Geneva, Lisbon, London, Vancouver, Denver and Sacramento in July 2017, in addition to Wellington in October 2017, to explore how different jurisdictions manage the problems of substance use and impacts on broader communities, and to meet with agencies involved in international drug policy and control. The report recommended that, the Victorian Government explore avenues to distribute naloxone more effectively, the report stated such avenues might include, needle and syringe programs and other community health services where staff are trained to educate others in administering naloxone, making naloxone available to first responders to overdose calls in areas with high concentrations of injecting heroin use, accompanied with appropriate training. The report also made a number of other recommendations including that the Victorian Government develop an emergency action plan to respond to a potential increase in deaths or overdoses as a result of high strength and purity of illicit substances, The Victorian Government commission an independent economic review into drug‑related expenditure and outcomes in Victoria, stating this should include a cost‑benefit analysis of all key initiatives and be made publicly available, The proposed Advisory Council on Drugs Policy investigate international developments in the regulated supply of cannabis for adult use, and advise the Victorian Government on policy outcomes in areas such as prevalence rates, public safety, and reducing the scale and scope of the illicit drug market and that Victoria Police commission an independent evaluation of the use of drug detection dogs at music festivals and other public spaces to determine their effectiveness in deterring the use and trafficking of illicit substances, and any unintended consequences or risk of harms resulting from this strategy.

On 17 October 2018 the Western Australia Legislative Council established the Select Committee into Alternate Approaches to Reducing Illicit Drug Use and its Effects on the Community. The Committee inquired into approaches to reducing harm from illicit drug use in other jurisdictions and compared their effectiveness to the approaches currently used in Western Australia. In November 2019, the committee published a report titled Help, Not Handcuffs: Evidence-based Approaches To Reducing Harm From Illicit Drug Use. The committee made a number of recommendations including that "a health-based response to the use and possession of drugs makes provision for the cultivation of cannabis for personal use", for the introduction of pill testing at music festivals, safe consumption rooms, as well as, in the reports summary for the abolishment of criminal penalties for personal use and possession of drugs. The committee also made a number of findings including, that "the current approach to prohibiting drug use is not having the intended effect of stopping people from taking drugs", "a zero-tolerance approach to drug use is incompatible with harm reduction" and that, "drug use and possession for personal use should be treated primarily as a health issue".

The recommendations were rejected by the McGowan, Labor led state government minutes after the report was publicly released, stating, "We are not going to soften our approach to illicit drug use".

In 2019 an inquest was held in relation to the deaths of six young people, aged 18 to 23, at music festivals in NSW between 2017 and 2019, hearing evidence from a number of health and law enforcement professionals amongst other experts. On the 8 November 2019 NSW deputy state coroner Harriet Grahame released findings from the inquest. In her report Grahame made a number of recommendations including for the introduction of pill testing at music festivals, for the government to pay to establish a permanent drug-checking facility outside the festival context, decriminalisation of drugs and the abolishment of sniffer dogs at music festivals. Grahame stated "Drug checking is simply an evidence-based harm reduction strategy". New South Wales premier, Gladys Berejiklian dismissed the recommendation to introduce pill testing at music festivals in the state, before the official release of the findings.

In 2019 the Queensland government instructed the Queensland Productivity Commission to conduct an enquiry into imprisonment and recidivism in QLD, the final report was sent to the Queensland Government on 1 August 2019 and publicly released on 31 January 2020. The commission found that "After many decades of operation, illicit drugs policy has failed to curb supply or use. The policy costs around $500 million per year to administer and is a key contributor to rising imprisonment rates (32 per cent since 2012). It also results in significant unintended harms, by incentivising the introduction of more harmful drugs and supporting a large criminal market". Evidence suggests moving away from a criminal approach will reduce harm and is unlikely to increase drug use". The committee made a number of recommendations including that the Queensland government enact a staged reform to legalise cannabis, as well as for the decriminalisation of other drugs. The QPC said the system had also fuelled an illegal market, particularly for methamphetamine. Although the Palaszczuk Queensland Labor Party led state government rejected the recommendations of its own commission stating they "have no plans to alter any drug laws".

In 2019 The Royal Australasian College of Physicians (RACP) and St Vincent Health Australia called on the NSW Government to publicly release the findings of the Special Commission of Inquiry into the Drug ‘Ice, saying there was "no excuse" for the delay. The report was the culmination of months of evidence from health and judicial experts, as well as families and communities affected by amphetamine-type substances across NSW. The report made 109 recommendations aimed to strengthen the NSW Governments response regarding amphetamine-based drugs such as crystal meth or ice. Major recommendations included more supervised drug use rooms, a prison needle and syringe exchange program, state-wide clinically supervised substance testing, including mobile pill testing at festivals, decriminalisation of drugs for personal use, a cease to the use of drug detection dogs at music festivals and to limit the use of strip searches. The report, also called for the NSW Government to adopt a comprehensive Drug and Alcohol policy, with the last drug and Alcohol policy expiring over a decade ago. The reports commissioner said the state's approach to drug use was profoundly flawed and said reform would require "political leadership and courage", "Criminalising use and possession encourages us to stigmatise people who use drugs as the authors of their own misfortune," Mr Howard said current laws "allow us tacit permission to turn a blind eye to the factors driving most problematic drug use" including "trauma, childhood abuse, domestic violence, unemployment, homelessness, dispossession, entrenched social disadvantage, mental illness, loneliness, despair and many other marginalising circumstances that attend the human condition". The NSW government rejected the reports key recommendations, saying it would consider the other remaining recommendations. Director of the Drug Policy Modelling Program (DPMP) at UNSW Sydney's Social Policy Research Centre said the NSW Government has missed an opportunity to reform the state's response to drugs based on evidence. The NSW Government is yet to officially respond to the inquiry as of November 2020, a statement was released from the government citing intention to respond by the end of 2020.

On 7 April 2021, the Coroners Court of Victoria released its findings in relation to the drug-related deaths of five young males, aged between 17 and 32, across Melbourne between July 2016 and January 2017. Coroner Spanos recommended that the Victorian Department of Health urgently implement a public drug checking service where samples are rapidly analysed for content and purity as well as an early warning network to alert the public to contaminated drugs in the community.

On 3 February 2023, it was announced that from July 2023, authorised psychiatrists in Australia will be able to legally prescribe MDMA for post-traumatic stress disorder (PTSD) and psilocybin for treatment-resistant depression.

=== Policing and other activities ===
On 19 September 2018 Attorney General of Western Australia, John Quigley instructed former Chief Justice Wayne Martin to conduct a review of the Criminal Property Confiscation Act including to "identify unintended consequences and anomalies in the operation of the Act and examination of whether the Act contains adequate safeguards to avoid undue hardship, unfairness or injustice to respondents and third parties." On 8 May 2019 Mr Martin AC QC published a report concluding that "the Act should be repealed and re-written". In the report Mr Martin stated that, "the Act is largely unconcerned with whether confiscation is fair or just" and "has the undeniable potential to inflict injustice, and to operate arbitrarily and unfairly".

In December 2020 following an investigation, the NSW Law Enforcement Conduct Commission (LECC) reported that strip searches conducted by NSW police were routinely unlawful.

In November 2021, Slater and Gordon and Redfern Legal Centre announced a potential class action against NSW Police following a number of unlawful strip searches performed at music festival Splendour in the Grass. In July 2022, Slater and Gordon and Redfern Legal Centre filed the class action lawsuit in the Supreme Court of New South Wales.

== Drug law reform ==
A number of Australian and international groups have promoted reform in regard to 21st-century Australian drug policy. Organisations such as Australian Parliamentary Group on Drug Law Reform, Responsible Choice, the Australian Drug Law Reform Foundation, Norml Australia, Law Enforcement Against Prohibition (LEAP) Australia and Drug Law Reform Australia advocate for drug law reform without the benefit of government funding. The membership of some of these organisations is diverse and consists of the general public, social workers, lawyers and doctors, and the Global Commission on Drug Policy has been a formative influence on a number of these organisations.

=== Australian Capital Territory drug reform ===
==== Cannabis ====
Since 2020, cannabis has been decriminalised for recreational use by those 18-years-old and over in the Australian Capital Territory (ACT). Adult residents are legally allowed to possess up to 50 grams of dried cannabis, or 150 grams of fresh cannabis, and are allowed to grow up to two cannabis plants per person, or a maximum of four per household. It is not legal for residents to grow cannabis using artificial systems (including hydroponics and aquaponics), and it remains illegal for residents to sell and gift cannabis.

=== Australian Parliamentary Group on Drug Law Reform ===
The Australian Parliamentary Group on Drug Law Reform consists of politicians from state and federal governments. Upon joining the group, all members sign a charter that states:

This Charter seeks to encourage a more rational, tolerant, non-judgmental, humanitarian and understanding approach to people who currently use illicit drugs in our community. The aims of the Australian Parliamentary Group for Drug Law Reform are to minimise the adverse health, social and economic consequences of Australia's policies and laws controlling drug use and supply.

As of 1998, short-term goals of the Group include:

- an increasing focus on the reduction of harm associated with drug use
- abolition of criminal sanctions for the personal use of drugs
- the adoption on a national basis of the South Australian and Australian Capital Territory expiation notice model for the reform of laws regarding the personal use of marijuana
- the adoption of a process including consultation and prescription by medical practitioners for selected illicit drugs

Long-term goals include "the reform of drug laws in planned stages with detailed evaluation of such laws at all stages and the minimisation of the harmful use of drugs".

=== Responsible Choice ===
According to its website, Responsible Choice is an organisation that was initiated in response to the criminalisation of cannabis in Australia, specifically in terms of the legalisation of alcohol, another drug that the organisation describes as "our ONLY legal similarly categorised substance". The organisation explains that its mission is to "enliven the debate as to whether or not cannabis should enjoy regulation within Australian society comparable to alcohol. It is also our intention to provide recent, relevant and factual information regarding both cannabis and alcohol" and Responsible Choice's "resident writer", Tim, further explains that:

As a parent I have come to realise that I no longer believe alcohol is a recreational drug I would encourage my children to use. Knowing full well that when the time comes the choice will not be mine to make, I have made it a goal of mine to investigate, research and comment on current drug policy juxtaposed with the negative effects alcohol, with a view towards providing researched based information to those who are seeking it. This has allowed me to see the place that cannabis should rightly have in our society, specifically in its capacity to reduce the harmful effects of alcohol.

As of February 2013, Responsible Choice provides support to the Australian Drug Law Reform political party.

=== Australian Drug Law Reform Foundation ===
The Charter of the Australian Drug Law Reform Foundation is "endorsed by the Australian Parliamentary Group for Drug Law Reform, seeks to encourage a more rational, tolerant and humanitarian approach to the problems created by drugs and drug use in Australia." Supporters of the organisation can provide financial donations, join the organisation as a member and review the website for its information resources. The website also lists numerous Australian supporters of drug law reform:

- Nicholas Cowdery AM QC Former NSW Director of Public Prosecutions
- Ken Crispin QC (retired) Supreme Court Judge
- Professor Peter Baume AC Former Senator for New South Wales
- Geoff Gallop Former Premier of Western Australia
- Dr. Wendell J. Rosevear OAM
- The Hon. Amanda Ruth Fazio Member of the NSW Legislative Council
- The Hon. Richard Stanley Leigh Jones Former Member of the NSW Legislative Council
- Dr Mal Washer MP Federal Liberal Member for Moore
- Kate Carnell AO Former Chief Minister of the ACT
- Michael Moore CEO Public Health Association of Australia and Former Minister for Health and Community Care
- Mick Palmer AO APM Former Commissioner, Australian Federal Police
- Dr Michael Wooldridge Former Commonwealth Minister for Health
- Professor David Penington AC Former dean of medicine and vice-chancellor at Melbourne University
- The Hon. Cate Faehrmann Member of the NSW Legislative Council
- The Hon. John Della Bosca Former member of the NSW Legislative Council

The Hon. Stanley Lee Jones states on the website of the Foundation:

If heroin were legal today, as it was in 1953, society would not have a drug problem. I talked to a former member for Monaro who was a chemist and who dispensed heroin in the 1950s. He said he had no problems with his customers when heroin was legal. In those days 70 per cent of crime was not associated with drug prohibition: It did not exist because heroin was legal. The problems began only when heroin became illegal and a criminal fraternity developed around its sale, as occurred during the prohibition era of the 1930s when criminals made money by selling illegal alcohol. When there is a profit motive involved people will push any illegal substance. That is the key problem: If there were no profit motive there would be no incentive to push drugs on the streets of Cabramatta or anywhere else. When people finally realise that they will find a solution to the drug problem.

The Foundation features numerous reports that are available for download on its website, such as the Australia21 reports "Alternatives to Prohibition" and "The Prohibition of Ilicit Drugs: Killing and Criminalising Our Children", "A Balancing Act" from the Open Society Foundation, Release's "A Quiet Revolution: Drug Decriminalisation Policies in Practice Across the Globe", and "Children of the Drug War", edited by Damon Barrett and produced by Harm Reduction International.

=== Australian Greens ===
The Australian Greens support the legalisation of cannabis in Australia for all adults (aged 18 years old and above). They also support treating drug use as a health issue rather than a criminal one under a harm minimisation and evidence based approach.

=== NORML Australia ===
The National Organisation to Reform Marijuana Laws (Australia) was first established in Sydney in 1980 by Mr Tony Kew and others. It followed from the Marijuana Petition Organisation that had run for a few years previously. The first offices were in Pitt St, Sydney close to Parliament House, before moving to a shopfront space in Kent St.

The original NORML was the premiere Cannabis Law Reform Lobby in Australia, with 'Nearly NORML, Nimbin' being the forerunner to HEMP which would eventually become the Legalise Cannabis Party.

NORML Australia was re-established by people to the original NORML in Kotara, New South Wales, produces a quarterly magazine (the first edition of the NORML Australia Magazine can be viewed online) and "supports the right of adults to use marijuana responsibly, whether for medical or personal purposes." The organisation "also supports the legalisation of hemp (non-psychoactive marijuana) for industrial use." The organisation's website's membership list consists of 17 individuals, while the representatives of the organisation of the organisation are also listed on the website: Sean Sylvester (President), David Perkins (Vice President) and Vickie Blay (Treasury).

=== Law Enforcement Against Prohibition (LEAP) Australia ===
As of February 2013, Paul Cubitt, a former correctional officer who was originally based at Long Bay prison in New South Wales, Australia, is the President of Law Enforcement Against Prohibition (LEAP) Australia. Cubitt has revealed that successive employment positions within the Australian correctional and justice system, including a period at the Alexander Maconochie correctional centre in Canberra, Australia, and a vocational course led him to an understanding of "the harm that society is doing to people who are afflicted by drug abuse". As of February 2013, the website of the organisation is not functional.

Greg Denham, a former police officer who served in the Australian states of Queensland and Victoria, has conducted work on behalf of LEAP Australia in Melbourne—as the executive officer of the Yarra Drug and Health Forum, Denham has also been a vocal supporter of a proposal to establish a supervised injecting facility in the Melbourne suburb of North Richmond.

=== Drug Law Reform Australia ===
The organisation, under the leadership of Greg Chipp, emerged prominently in 2013, and is a political outflow of non-political parents' and friends' groups for drug law reform. The organisation achieved the status of a political party in early 2013 by attracting in excess of 500 members, and fielded candidates in the 2013 Australian election. The goals of the Drug Law Reform Party are:

- Stop the senseless harm caused by the failed prohibition policies, which criminalise ordinary Australians for personal drug use.
- Advocate for conscience votes on single issues where legislation does not match the lived reality of large proportions of the Australian public.
- To encourage political and community debate of alternatives to the current drug laws.
- Call for a royal commission into organised crime and corruption associated with the drug trade.
- Through parliament representation, use the senate committees, and productivity commission to examine the current drug laws.

The party was officially deregistered on 31 July 2017.

=== Reason Party ===
Reason Australia supports the decriminalisation of the use and possession of all drugs, harm reduction, and improved access to healthcare. The party also supports a legal and regulated market for the adult use of cannabis in Australia. The party has declared its support for "the states and territories implementing pill testing and safe injecting health services."

Among the party's reasons for these policies are that they state drug criminalisation mostly impacts those who are already disadvantaged, such as Aboriginal Australians and young people. It also declares itself to be civil libertarian, advocating that adults have the right to decide what to do with their own bodies. The party states that instead of prohibition it supports harm reduction and improving education about drugs.

=== Global Commission on Drugs ===
In its 2011 report, the Global Commission on Drugs found that the "global war on drugs has failed." The commission, headed by several former heads of state, a former UN Secretary General and others, observed that governments around the world must begin introducing "models of legal regulation of drugs to undermine the power of organised crime and safeguard the health and security of their citizens." With this in mind, the organisation, Australia 21, began researching drug policy in the Australian context.

=== Australia21 reports ===
In response to a 2011 international report by the Global Commission on Drugs, the organisation, Australia21 appointed a steering committee to evaluate Australia's current illicit drug policy. The report found that Australia's current drug policy, focused as it is, on criminalisation of supply and use of drugs, has driven the production and use of drugs underground and has "fostered the development of a criminal industry that is corrupting civil society and government and killing our children." They also noted that "[b]y defining the personal use and possession of certain psychoactive drugs as criminal acts, governments have also avoided any responsibility to regulate and control the quality of substances that are in widespread use." The report also highlighted the fact that, just as alcohol and tobacco are regulated for quality assurance, distribution, marketing and taxation, so should currently, unregulated, illicit drugs.

The independent organisation has also released the following reports: "Alternatives to Prohibition" and "The Prohibition of Illicit Drugs: Killing and Criminalising Our Children".

== Australian illicit drug user organisations ==
In response to the emergence of HIV/AIDS in the mid-1980s, Australian drug users began to self-organise into the community, peer-driven state, and national drug user organisations. The aim of these organisations was to give voice to the experiences of Australian drug users and to advocate for drug-related policy reform, the provision of harm reduction prophylactics, the expansion of opioid substitution programs, to highlight the health issues affecting illicit drug users and to reduce the stigma and discrimination many illicit drug users experience. Drug user organisations have been recognised by state and federal governments as an effective strategy to educate illicit drug users in relation to techniques for avoiding blood-borne virus transmission, responding to drug overdose, safer injecting techniques, safer sex and legal issues. Australian drug user organisations use a peer education and community development approach to health promotion, with the aim of empowering illicit drug users by providing them with the skills they need to effect change in their own communities.

As of November 2012, every Australian State and Territory, with the exception of Tasmania, has a drug user organisation. A number of health services also employ illicit drug users to provide peer education in relation to specific issues affecting illicit drug users. Australia's peer-based drug user organisations are members of the Australian Injecting and Illicit Drug Users League (AIVL), a national drug user organisation, which advocates for changes to current illicit drug policy at a national level. As a member-based organisation, AIVL also supports State and Territory peer-based organisations to strengthen their internal governance structures, their capacity to provide services to illicit drug users and assists member-based organisations to develop advocacy strategies for engaging in localised drug-related policy issues.

AIVL is a member of the International Network of People who Use Drugs (INPUD), an international network of drug user organisations and drug user activists, that advocate for the health and human rights of illicit drug users. INPUD facilitates representation by illicit drug users to lobby international policy-making bodies such as the United Nations Office on Drugs and Crime, the World Health Organization, UNAIDS, Harm Reduction International, the Commission on Narcotic Drugs and the International AIDS Society.

== Statistics ==
=== Imprisonment ===
In 2017, 6,155 people were in prison with their most serious offence being an illicit drug crime. This was 15% of all prisoners in Australia.

From 2013 to 2017, the number of people imprisoned for illicit drug crimes increased faster than people imprisoned for any other type of crime.

In 1990, 1,347 people were in prison with the most serious offence being an illicit drug offence. This was 10% of all prisoners in Australia.

=== Arrests ===
Between 2015 and 2016, in Australia there were a total of 154,538 recorded arrests relating to illicit drugs.

Total Illicit drug arrests
State	Male	Female	Unknown	Total
NSW	26,100	6,112	11	32,223
Victoria	21,558	5,791	22	27,371
Queensland	10,708	12,041	0	22,749
South Australia	14,320	3,927	6	18,253
Western Australia	18,807	6,494	75	25,386
Tasmania	1,982	479	0	2,461
Northern Territory	1,814	639	0	2,453
ACT	546	96	0	642
Total	118,835	35,579	124	154,538

=== Visa cancellations ===
Between 2020 and 2021 drug offences were the leading cause for visa cancellations under section 501 of the Migration Act 1958

== See also ==
- Australian National Council on Drugs
- Cannabis in Australia
- Crime in Australia
- Drug courts in Australia
- Drug liberalization
- Drug prohibition law
- Fusion Party
- Legalise Cannabis Australia
- Methamphetamine use in Australia
- Network Against Prohibition
- Punishment in Australia
- Recreational drug use
- Uniting Medically Supervised Injecting Centre
