= Australian National Council on Drugs =

Australian Medical and Health Organisation

- Abbreviation: ANCD
- Named after: Australian National Advisory Council on alcohol and drugs
- Founded: 1998
- Founder: Prime Minister
- Founded at: Canberra
- Purpose: reduce the harm caused by drugs in Australia
- Location: Canberra, Australia
- Website: www.ancd.org.au

The Australian National Council on Drugs (ANCD) describes itself as "the principal advisory body to Government on drug policy and plays a critical role in ensuring the voice of the community is heard in relation to drug related policies and strategies." The Council occupies a unique position by virtue of its role in enhancing the partnership between the government and the community. It has pivotal advisory, advocacy and representative functions, with a significant role to provide government Ministers with independent, expert advice on matters related to licit and illicit drugs.

It was chaired by Dr John Herron.

== History ==
In 1998, the Prime Minister established the ANCD as part of the Commonwealth Government's response to reduce the harm caused by drugs in Australia.

In 2004, National Indigenous Drug and Alcohol Committee (NIADC) was established by The Australian National Council on Drugs (ANCD) specially provide the most suitable and efficient solution for ANCD to solve the problems of Indigenous drug and alcohol in Australia.

The Australian National Council on Drugs (ANCD) were renamed as Australian National Advisory Council on alcohol and drugs (ANACAD).

== Role ==
The Australian Government Department of Health has listed a number of roles of the Australian National Council on Drugs:

1. The Australian National Council on Drugs (ANCD) provided confidential suggestion to support Australian Government on:

- Present and coming up drug use trends.
- Verified prime concern of National significance.
- Drug abusing problems of Aboriginal and Torres Strait Islander people.

2. Suggesting the implementation and evaluation strategies of policies and practices that provide temporary demonstrable benefits; and continuing strategies that affects alcohol and other drug channels.

3. Providing advices and supporting Australian Government’s dedication to the new Drug Strategy and frameworks.

4. Counselling on Drugs prevention education activities through National Drugs campaign.

5. Reporting directly to the Minister of Health responsible for drug policy.

6. Providing yearly reports to Prime minister

7. Engaging Indigenous expert on drug uses issues.

== Members ==
The ANCD members involve experts with experience relating to drugs.

Position	Name	Start date	End date
Chairman	Mrs. Kay Hull	1 January 2018	31 December 2020
Duputy	Professor. Steve Allsop	1 January 2018	31 December 2020
Member	Dr. Robert Ali	1 January 2018	31 December 2020
Member	Mr. John Rogerson	1 January 2018	31 December 2020
Member	Dr. Diana Egerton-Warburton	1 January 2018	31 December 2020
Member	Ms. Jo Baxter	1 January 2018	31 December 2020
Member	Mr. Frank Quinlan	1 January 2018	31 December 2020
Member	Detective Superintendent Anthony Fleming	1 January 2018	31 December 2020
Member	Dr. James Fitzpatrick	1 January 2018	31 December 2020
Member	Associate Professor James Ward	1 January 2018	31 December 2020
Member	Ms. Rebecca Lang	1 January 2018	31 December 2020
Member	Dr. Nicole Lee	1 January 2018	31 December 2020
Member	Mr. Jack Nagle	1 January 2018	31 December 2020
Member	Adjunct Associate Professor Pattie Hudson	1 January 2018	31 December 2020

== Sub-Committee ==
=== National Indigenous Drug and Alcohol Committee (NIADC) ===
Excessive drug use causes related harm to Indigenous Australians. Strategies to address these significant problems are the key focus of the Aboriginal and Torres Strait Islander supplementary action plan, was approved by the Council of Ministers for drug strategy.

In 2004, The Australian National Council on Drugs established National Indigenous Drug and Alcohol (NIADC) as a part of Federal Government specifically provides advice to ANCD to solve the drug issues of indigenous in Australia.

National Indigenous Drug and Alcohol (NIADC) plays an important role in ensuring that Indigenous Australians have a voice in the development of policies and programs that affect their communities. NIADC provides high-quality and independent advice to the government through consultation feedback and the expertise of its members to help Indigenous Australians tackle alcohol and other drug problems, and funding for indigenous treatment and related support services

In December 2014, NIADC was defunded and closed their website. The NIADC website contents were archived by ATODA website.

== Support and treatment ==
The problematic drug uses impact the parents, carers and other family members of youth substance abusers. There are three key supports for family members of youth abusers:

=== Support intercessions for family members of youth with difficulty on substance use. ===
==== Behavioural exchange systems training (BEST) ====
The BEST program includes Family Therapy and Behaviour Therapy. The aspects of this program are to improve parents of young substance abusers' emotional wellbeing, and focus on addressing the relationship between responsibility and shame.

According to the previous work on their parents, researchers recognised most parents blame themselves by their drug – abusing kids. Secondly, adolescents' behaviours determine their parents emotional state and Well – Being. This Program concentrated on understanding and changing the interaction between young people and their parents which depended on young people's behaviour and parents’discernment on their behaviour and their relationship.

The BEST program is a nine-week curriculum, was designed for the child aged between 12–24 years old, consist of eight weekly meetings.

The first four weeks of the program focused on challenging parents to take different views of the relationship between parents and young people. The separation of adolescent development tasks is emphasized to encourage parents to reduce their sense of responsibility for solving adolescent behavioural problems. It has been assumed that, in turn, parents' distress may be reduced. The remaining four weeks tasks are based on the principle of the Behaviour Therapy, aims to reduce drug misuse by bringing out their responsible behaviours.

==== Parent coping skills training ====
Parents' coping skills training program was designed based on coping with the perspective of tension and parents' response to substance abuse in adolescents can help improve parents' own psychological function and reduce young people drug abuse. This program was designed for the youth drug abusers (aged between 12–21 years)' parents.

The parent coping skills training program is an eight - week group training program designed for educating parents on common problems arising from drug abuse among adolescents. The Topic discuss in the sessions were: replacing negative thoughts with positive thoughts, accurate information of drugs; communication points; use of positive and negative consequences; development of internal rules; issues related to young people’s treatment and post-treatment that can help parents.

The standard problem - solving model is used to discuss Parent Situation Inventory, an inventory of typical problems faced by parents of youth substance abuser, in groups. In this model, problems are identified and alternative solutions are proposed and evaluated. Group facilitators will role play with parent volunteers and encourage parents to do the role-play of situations.

=== Family- based interventions for treatment of young drug abusers ===
==== Family systems theory ====
This theory defines the personal functioning and one's main relationship environment, family are interrelated. Functional difficulties are conceptualized according to recurring patterns and the order of interactions between family members. Generally, drug abuse among adolescents is considered to related to their family members, their communication and interaction. The focus of this treatment on changing the pattern on parental interaction that allows, continues, or encourages problematic drug abuse behaviour. Thus, the young people’s behaviour is discerned family members in all their simultaneous interaction.

==== Cognitive behaviour theory family-based interventions ====
Cognitive Behaviour Theory (CBT) has been comprised in the traditional Family – Based interventions to defined that youth problematic drug abuse based on the family members behaviour. From this perspective, drug abuse is seen as a conditional behaviour, whether substance abuse may be directly imitated and reinforced by other family members, or whether parents are tolerant of young people's initial attempts at drugs. For this perspective, the treatment of adolescents' substance misuse appears again in the family, especially in skills training to manage the behaviour in the family. Thereby, conditions and behaviours that are compatible with drug use decrease with the strengthening of conditions incompatible with drug abuse. The focus of treatment on emergency administration training to enhance minimise material, abuse, and various other skills training.

=== Multi-dimensional family treatment interventions for youth drug abusers ===
Multi-dimensional family therapy (MDFT) was created for improving the ability of adolescents and their families in risk behaviours and multiple functional areas. It has been tested in different environments and different populations, and has proved to be effective. Multi-dimensional family therapy is a comprehensive, developmental/ ecological, family based multi-component and phased intervention, it addresses the internal aspects, including the adolescents who abuse drugs for coping with their stress, the parenting practices of parents, other substance -abusing family member in home, conflicts between young people and parents, the development and persistence of drug abuse and other related issues. This treatment directly affects both parents and adolescents’s functioning via social systems, such as school, occupation, peer networks, anti – social and substance abuse.

=== Aboriginal and Torres Strait Islander populations ===
Alcohol and other Drugs (AOD) treatment is an integral part of a multifaceted approach to reducing the impact of Drug use harms on Aboriginal and Torres Strait Islanders and their communities.

==== Indigenous family treatment program ====
The uses of Indigenous Family coping model are supported by Centacare NT. This program aimed at reducing the drug – abusing harm and harm on family experiencing. Family -Based Interventions provide enormous potential for reducing the Drug use harm.

The treatment was designed to reducing the drug use harm by

- Recognising the needs of families in AOD treatment stress-related issues
- Educating families dependent on Drug use
- Recognising the mental health issues of both drug abusers and family members.

==== Yeaca Dhargo Family Project ====
was supported by Kurbingui Youth Association in the Outer Northern Brisbane – Sillmere, Sandgate, Bracken Ridge, Aspley, Nundah and Banyo, QLD. to deal with youth substance abuser in Indigenous Family.

This Family supporting program includes:

- Education on types, signs and effects of drugs
- Young people and drugs, the scope of drug abuse and the cycle of change
- The changing role of parents

== See also ==
- Australian Pharmaceutical Advisory Council
- Cannabis in Australia
- Illicit drug use in Australia
