= Australian Pharmaceutical Advisory Council =

Former forum for medical professionals

The Australian Pharmaceutical Advisory Council (APAC), active between 1996 and 2006, was "a consultative forum that brought together stakeholders from the medical, nursing and pharmacy professions, as well as industry, consumers and government, to advise the Australian Government Minister for Health and Ageing on medicines policy". In 1996 APAC contributed to the Industry Commission inquiry into the pharmaceutical industry. Over subsequent years the Council developed Australia's National Medicines Policy (NMP), and published several guidelines on medication management. Secretariat support for APAC was provided by the Australian Government Department of Health and Ageing - National Medicines Policy Strategies Section.

In late 2005, the Department of Health and Ageing engaged a consultant to undertake a review of APAC's operational arrangements. Possibly a recommendation of this review was to discontinue the council. APAC's final public documents appeared in 2006.

== Publications ==
In 1996 APAC released Australian Guidelines for Drug Donations to Developing Countries, based on drug donation guidelines developed by the World Health Organization.

In 1997 APAC released Integrated Best Practice Model for Medication Management in Residential Aged Care Facilities, with a 3rd edition released in 2002 as Guidelines for Medication Management in Residential Aged Care Facilities.

From 2003 the APAC Community Care Working Party began to develop, and in 2006 APAC released Guiding Principles for Medication Management in the Community, "targeted at paid health and community care service providers supporting older people to manage their medicines in their home and in the community".

In 2005 APAC released Guiding Principles to Achieve Continuity in Medication Management, to reduce "the discontinuity that occurs when consumers move between different health care settings and health care providers," which often causes "patient harm and sub-optimal use of medicines".

== Membership ==
APAC member organisations included:

- Australian Council of Social Service (ACOSS)
- Australian General Practice Network (AGPN)
- Australian Medical Association (AMA)
- Australian Medical Writers Association (AMWA)
- Australian Nursing Federation (ANF)
- Australian Pensioners' and Superannuants' Federation (AP&SF)
- Australian Self-Medication Industry (ASMI)
- Australasian Society of Clinical and Experimental Pharmacologists and Toxicologists (ASCEPT)
- Complementary Healthcare Council of Australia (CHC)
- Consumers' Health Forum of Australia (CHF)
- Council on the Ageing (COTA) National Seniors
- Commonwealth Department of Health and Ageing - Policy and Analysis Branch
- Commonwealth Department of Health and Ageing - Therapeutic Goods Administration (TGA)
- Doctors' Reform Society (DRS)
- Federation of Ethnic Communities' Councils of Australia (FECCA)
- Generic Medicines Industry Association (GMiA)
- Medicines Australia
- National Aboriginal Community Controlled Health Organisation (NACCHO)
- National Pharmaceutical Services Association (NPSA)
- National Prescribing Service (NPS)
- Pharmaceutical Benefits Advisory Committee (PBAC)
- Pharmaceutical Health and Rational Use of Medicines (PHARM) Committee
- Pharmaceutical Society of Australia (PSA)
- Pharmacy Guild of Australia (PGA)
- Returned and Services League (RSL)
- Royal Australian College of General Practitioners (RACGP)
- Royal Australasian College of Physicians (RACP)
- Royal College of Nursing Australia (RCNA)
- Society of Hospital Pharmacists of Australia (SHPA)
