= Methamphetamine use in Australia =

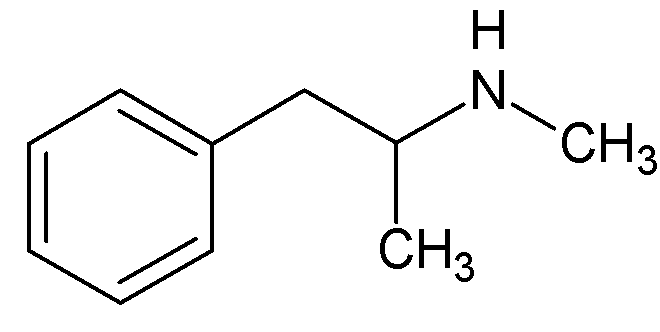
Chemical compound make up of Methamphetamine

Under Australia's Poisons Standard, methamphetamine, listed as metamfetamine, is a Schedule 8 controlled drug: a substance that should be available for use but whose manufacture, supply, distribution, possession and use are restricted because of risks of abuse, misuse and dependence. The drug is sought after to give oneself a 'high' or a 'rush' in their body. Users of this drug often feel senses of exhilaration and arousal as the brain is flooded with monoamines. Methamphetamine has many names not only in Australia, but also around the world. These include chalk, crypto, gear, getgo, tweak, cold and cristy, although the two most common ones in Australia today are ice and shard. Speed refers to the powder form of the drug, while ice refers to the highly purified, crystalline form. The powder form is often diluted with adulterants including glucose and sucrose.

Methamphetamine was synthesised in Japan in 1893 from the drug ephedrine; and since then has changed into a variety of different forms. Australia has a drug scene which is increasing with the demand for drugs like methamphetamine since the start of 2000. As of April 2017, Australia has the highest methamphetamine addiction rate in the world.

== History ==
Methamphetamine was first synthesised in Japan by the chemist Nagai Nagayoshi; however, it did not come into prominent public view until the early 1990s when the Australian Federal Police (AFP) was warned of a new drug called "Ice" coming from overseas. During 1991, Hong Kong, Japan and Australia pooled their resources together to seize 80 kilograms of the methamphetamine drug which was believed to be manufactured in China.

Since the late 1990s, the amount of amphetamine type stimulants and crystal methamphetamine found by the Australian Customs has been increasing, to 1,075 kilograms of amphetamine-type stimulants detected at the border in 2011, an increase from the 71 kilograms found in 1997. Today, the drug is in high demand all across Australia, and with this the authorities have been seizing large quantities on a regular basis.

During November 2014, the Australian Federal Police successfully intercepted and seized Australia's second largest drug bust which weighed in at 2.8 tonnes, which included 1.917 tonnes of MDMA and 849 kilograms (kg) of methamphetamine. This bust was the largest methamphetamine seizure and the second largest MDMA bust by the AFP since the first seizure in 1997. The biggest bust of methamphetamine occurred in 2022. 1,800 kg of ice was found inside shipping containers at a Sydney port. Around 750 meth labs were raided in 2014.

In 2018, an industrial-sized, clandestine laboratory was discovered in Croydon. The property was located on a suburban street of Adelaide and could produce hundreds of millions of dollars' worth of illicit drugs. In 2020, a total of 5.2 tonnes of methamphetamine was apprehended by the Australian Federal Police.

=== Special Commission ===
In 2019, the Royal Australasian College of Physicians (RACP) and St Vincent Health Australia called on the NSW Government to publicly release the findings of the Special Commission of Inquiry into the Drug 'Ice', saying there was "no excuse" for the delay. The report was the culmination of months of evidence from health and judicial experts, as well as families and communities affected by amphetamine-type substances across NSW. The report made 109 recommendations aimed to strengthen the NSW Governments response regarding amphetamine-based drugs such as crystal meth or ice. Major recommendations included more supervised drug use rooms, a prison needle and syringe exchange program, state-wide clinically supervised substance testing, including mobile pill testing at festivals, decriminalisation of drugs for personal use, a cease to the use of drug detection dogs at music festivals and to limit the use of strip searches.

The report, also called for the NSW Government to adopt a comprehensive Drug and Alcohol policy, with the last drug and Alcohol policy expiring over a decade ago. The reports commissioner said the state's approach to drug use was profoundly flawed and said reform would require "political leadership and courage", "Criminalising use and possession encourages us to stigmatise people who use drugs as the authors of their own misfortunate," Mr Howard said current laws "allow us tacit permission to turn a blind eye to the factors driving most problematic drug use" including childhood abuse, domestic violence and mental illness. The NSW government rejected the reports key recommendations, saying it would consider the other remaining recommendations. Director of the Drug Policy Modelling Program (DPMP) at UNSW Sydney's Social Policy Research Centre said the NSW Government has missed an opportunity to reform the state's response to drugs based on evidence. The NSW Government is yet to officially respond to the inquiry as of November 2020, a statement was released from the government citing intention to respond by the end of 2020. The Perrottet government responded to the report two years and eight months after its release. They supported 86 of the inquiry's 109 recommendations but stopped short of decriminalisation with Perrottet saying "Drugs have no place in our society".

== Legislation and policy (punishment) ==
Australian governments have placed a strong emphasis on law enforcement in response to the methamphetamine problem. Disruption of supply of the drug and pseudoephedrine, a precursor drug used in its manufacture, has been the focus of police activities. Penalties for selling, possession and use of meth vary by state or territory. In Australia, it is an offence to drive with methamphetamine present in the body or to drive under its influence.

	Western Australia	New South Wales	Victoria	Tasmania
Amount in grams to be charged with possession of a prohibited substance	Over 4.0 grams	Over 3.0 grams	Over 0.75 grams	N/A**
Amount in grams to be charged with intent to sell and supply a prohibited substance	Over 2.0 grams	N/A**	N/A**	N/A**
Amount in grams to be charged with the intent of trafficking a prohibited substance	Over 2.0 grams	Over 3.0 grams	Over 3.0 grams	Over 25.0 grams

** Information in regards to selling and supply also, possession of a classified substance is classed differently in each state. Some have small trafficable quantities, trafficable, large trafficable and commercial trafficable quantities as legislative policies.

	Western Australia	New South Wales	Victoria	Tasmania
Penalties after prosecution of being charged with possession of a prohibited substance	2 Years Maximum Imprisonment and / or $2,000 fine	2 Years Maximum Imprisonment	1 Year Maximum Imprisonment	2 Years Maximum Imprisonment
Penalties after successful prosecution of being charged with sell and supply a prohibited substance	5 Years Maximum Imprisonment and / or $20,000	N/A***	N/A***	4 Years Maximum Imprisonment
Penalties after successful prosecution of being charged with trafficking a prohibited substance	25 Years Maximum Imprisonment and / or $100,000 fine	15 Years Maximum Imprisonment	15 Years Maximum Imprisonment	21 Years maximum Imprisonment

*** Intent to sell and supply comes under trafficking laws in some states in Australia depending upon the amount of prohibited substance.

== Manufacture and distribution ==
Illicit methamphetamine is manufactured in rolling meth labs and imported from South-East Asia. Local labs are found in residential areas. Shipping containers, motel room, car boots and trucks are also used as labs. Organised crime groups import, manufacture, and distribute methamphetamine in Australia.

Criminals involved in outlaw motorcycle clubs produce and distribute methamphetamine in Australia. A social network of drug users and word of mouth are the most likely methods of distribution. The street value for methamphetamine in Australia is among the highest in the world because the market is small and geographically isolated.

== Usage ==
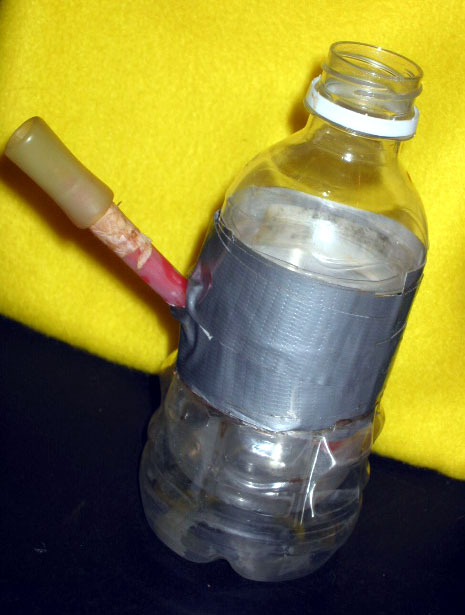
Homemade meth bong, another way which drug users get a 'high'.

Between 2009 and 2010 there were 41,087 illicit drug offenses in Australia. Between 2013 and 2014 this number increased by over 25 percent to 50,854 drug offenses; furthermore, drug use increased from 22,842 to 28,409 over the same period of time. This portrays an increasing trend in the amount of drug use in Australia and drug offenses. However, since methamphetamine has become more available in the drug scene in Australia, stronger forms of methamphetamine such as crystal methamphetamine, become more frequently used within the past decade. In studies conducted by the Australian Government, between 1998 and 2010 there has been a slight decrease in the methamphetamine drug use in Australia; furthermore, between 2007 and 2010 methamphetamine use in males decreased from 9.8% to 6.8%. Since 2007, the trend has decreased in association to drug use with methamphetamine; however, after 2010 the trend according to the Australian Bureau of Statistics indicate an increase in drug use and drug offenses occurring in Australia. Smoking is more common than injecting and other ways to obtain a high.

As of April 2017, Australia has the highest methamphetamine addiction rate in the world. Methamphetamine use is often characterised as a crisis or epidemic by politicians and in the media. Users are often framed as criminal, deviant or dangerous. Regional New South Wales has the highest meth use among rural Australia.

In 2020, the Australian Institute of Health and Welfare published a report titled Alcohol, tobacco & other drugs in Australia, the report found Australia has the fourth highest average total stimulant consumption when compared with 29 countries across Europe, North America, Oceania, and South Africa. The report also found that there has been a rapid increase in the number of deaths involving methamphetamine and other stimulants, with the death rate in 2018 four times higher than that in 1999 (1.7 deaths compared with 0.4 deaths per 100,000 population, respectively). There was a notable increase in hospital separations with methamphetamine drug-related principal diagnoses, rising from 3.1% of all drug-related principal diagnoses in 2013–14 to 7.6% in 2017–18 and that amphetamines were a principal drug of concern for a client's own drug use in 28% of closed treatment episodes, the second most common principal drug of concern behind alcohol (36%).

== Risk groups ==
Methamphetamine use is an increasing problem in Australia, as it becomes more readily available. In a study of injecting drug users, 53% of a group of 914 candidates reported that methamphetamine was their first drug injected into their bodies; however, the study continued to convey the point that it is a young adults' drug. During the last six months, 87% of injecting drug users under the age of 25 were reported to have used methamphetamine in the last six months, with 25 to 35-year-olds at 80% and 35 years and above at 74%.

The Australian Institute of Health and Welfare reported that males were more likely than females to use methamphetamine (8.2% to 5.9% respectively) and 20- to 29-year-olds were most likely to have used methamphetamine recently. The study also found, for people aged 14 years or older, the highest level of recent methamphetamine use was found among those who stated they were homosexual/bisexual (7.1%). Methamphetamine use was also high among unemployed people (4.8%), those who had never been married (3.8%) and single people without children (3.4%).

== See also ==
- Illicit drug use in Australia
- History and culture of substituted amphetamines
